= List of schools in Hertfordshire =

This is a list of schools in Hertfordshire, England.

== State-funded schools ==
=== Primary schools ===
- The Abbey CE Primary School, St Albans
- Abbots Langley School, Abbots Langley
- Abel Smith School, Hertford
- Aboyne Lodge JMI School, St Albans
- Alban City School, St Albans
- Alban Wood Primary School, Watford
- Albury CE Primary School, Albury
- Aldbury CE Primary School, Aldbury
- All Saints CE Primary School, Datchworth
- All Saints CE Primary School, Bishop's Stortford
- Almond Hill Junior School, Stevenage
- Anstey First School, Anstey
- Applecroft School, Welwyn Garden City
- Ardeley St Lawrence CE Primary School, Ardeley
- Arnett Hills JMI School, Rickmansworth
- Ascot Road Community Free School, Watford
- Ashfield Junior School, Bushey
- Ashtree Primary School, Stevenage
- Ashwell Primary School, Ashwell
- Aston St Mary's CE Primary School, Aston
- Avanti Brook Primary School, Bishop's Stortford
- Avanti Meadows Primary School, Bishop's Stortford
- Aycliffe Drive Primary School, Hemel Hempstead
- Barkway CE First School, Barkway
- Barley CE First School, Barley
- Bayford CE Primary School, Bayford
- Bedmond Academy, Bedmond
- Bedwell Primary School, Bedwell
- Beech Hyde Primary School, Wheathampstead
- Beechfield School, Watford
- Belswains Primary School, Hemel Hempstead
- Bengeo Primary School, Hertford
- Benington CE Primary School, Benington
- Bernards Heath Infant School, Bernards Heath
- Bernards Heath Junior School, Bernards Heath
- Birchwood Avenue Primary School, Hatfield
- Bishop Wood CE Junior School, Tring
- Bonneygrove Primary School, Cheshunt
- Bournehall Primary School, Bushey
- Bovingdon Primary Academy, Bovingdon
- Bowmansgreen Primary School, London Colney
- Boxmoor Primary School, Hemel Hempstead
- Breachwood Green JMI School, Breachwood Green
- Bridgewater Primary School, Berkhamsted
- Broadfield Academy, Hemel Hempstead
- Brockswood Primary and Nursery School, Hemel Hempstead
- Bromet, Watford
- Brookland Infant School, Cheshunt
- Brookland Junior School, Cheshunt
- Brookmans Park School, Brookmans Park
- Broom Barns Primary School, Stevenage
- Broxbourne CE Primary School, Broxbourne
- Buntingford First School, Buntingford
- Burleigh Primary School, Cheshunt
- Bushey and Oxhey Infant School, Bushey
- Bushey Heath Primary School, Bushey
- Bushey Manor Junior School, Bushey
- Camp Primary School, St. Albans
- Camps Hill Primary School, Stevenage
- Cassiobury Infant School, Watford
- Cassiobury Junior School, Watford
- Central Primary School, Watford
- Chambersbury Primary School, Hemel Hempstead
- Chater Infant School, Watford
- Chater Junior School, Watford
- Cherry Tree Primary School, Watford
- Chorleywood Primary School, Chorleywood
- Christ Church CE Primary School, Ware
- Christ Church Chorleywood CE School, Chorleywood
- Churchfield CE Academy, Cheshunt
- Clore Shalom School, Shenley
- Coates Way JMI School, Watford
- Cockernhoe Endowed CE Primary School, Cockernhoe
- Codicote CE Primary School, Codicote
- Colney Heath JMI School, Colney Heath
- Commonswood Primary School, Welwyn Garden City
- Countess Anne CE School, Hatfield
- Cowley Hill School, Borehamwood
- Crabtree Infants' School, Harpenden
- Crabtree Junior School, Harpenden
- Cranborne Primary School, Potters Bar
- The Cranbourne Primary School, Hoddesdon
- Creswick Primary School, Welwyn Garden City
- Cuffley School, Cuffley
- Cunningham Hill Infant School, St. Albans
- Cunningham Hill Junior School, St. Albans
- De Havilland Primary School, Hatfield
- Dewhurst St Mary CE Primary School, Cheshunt
- Divine Saviour RC Primary School, Abbotts Langley
- Downfield Primary School, Cheshunt
- Dundale Primary School, Tring
- Eastbury Farm Primary School, Northwood
- Essendon CE Primary School, Essendon
- Fair Field Junior School, Radlett
- Fairfields Primary School, Cheshunt
- Fairlands Primary School, Stevenage
- Fawbert and Barnard Infants' School, Sawbridgeworth
- Featherstone Wood Primary School, Stevenage
- Field Junior School, Watford
- Flamstead End School, Cheshunt
- Flamstead Village School, Flamstead
- Fleetville Infant School, Fleetville
- Fleetville Junior School, Fleetville
- Forres Primary School, Hoddesdon
- Four Swannes Primary School, Waltham Cross
- Furneux Pelham CE School, Buntingford
- Gaddesden Row JMI School, Hemel Hempstead
- Gade Valley Primary School, Hemel Hempstead
- Galley Hill Primary School and Nursery, Hemel Hempstead
- Garden City Academy, Letchworth Garden City
- Garden Fields JMI School, St. Albans
- George Street Primary School, Hemel Hempstead
- Giles Junior School, Stevenage
- The Giles Infants School, Stevenage
- Goffs Oak Primary School, Goffs Oak
- Goldfield Infants' School, Tring
- The Grange Academy, Letchworth
- Graveley Primary School, Graveley
- Great Gaddesden CE Primary School, Great Gaddesden
- Green Lanes Primary School, Hatfield
- Greenfields Primary School, Watford
- Greenway Primary School, Berkhamsted
- The Greneway School, Royston
- The Grove Academy, Watford
- The Grove Infant School, Harpenden
- The Grove Junior School, Harpenden
- Grove Road Primary School, Tring
- Hammond Academy, Hemel Hempstead
- Harpenden Academy, Harpenden
- Hartsbourne Primary School, Bushey Heath
- Hartsfield JMI School, Baldock
- Harvey Road Primary School, Croxley Green
- Harwood Hill JMI School, Welwyn Garden City
- Hatfield Community Free School, Hatfield
- Hertford Heath Primary School, Hertford Heath
- Hertford St Andrews CE Primary School, Hertford
- Hertingfordbury Cowper CE Primary School, Hertford
- Hertsmere Jewish Primary School, Radlett
- Hexton JMI School, Hitchin
- High Beeches Primary School, Harpenden
- High Wych CE Primary School, High Wych
- Highbury Infant School, Hitchin
- Highover JMI School, Hitchin
- Highwood Primary School, Bushey
- Hillmead Primary School, Bishop's Stortford
- Hillshott Infant School, Letchworth Garden City
- Hobbs Hill Wood Primary School, Hemel Hempstead
- Hobletts Manor Infants' School, Hemel Hempstead
- Hobletts Manor Junior School, Hemel Hempstead
- Holdbrook Primary School, Waltham Cross
- Hollybush Primary School, Hertford
- Holtsmere End Infant School, Hemel Hempstead
- Holtsmere End Junior School, Hemel Hempstead
- Holwell Primary School, Welwyn Garden City
- The Holy Family RC Primary School, Welwyn Garden City
- Holy Rood RC Primary School, Watford
- Holy Trinity CE Primary School, Cheshunt
- Holywell Primary School, Watford
- Homerswood Primary School, Welwyn Garden City
- Hormead CE First School, Buntingford
- How Wood Primary School, Park Street
- Howe Dell Primary School, Hatfield
- Hunsdon JMI School, Hunsdon
- Hurst Drive Primary School, Waltham Cross
- Ickleford Primary School, Ickleford
- Icknield Infant School, Letchworth Garden City
- Icknield Walk First School, Royston
- Jenyns First School, Braughing
- Jupiter Community Free School, Hemel Hempstead
- Kenilworth Primary School, Borehamwood
- Killigrew Primary School, St. Albans
- Kimpton Primary School, Kimpton
- Kings Langley Primary School, Kings Langley
- Kingshill Infant School, Ware
- Kingsway Infant School, Watford
- Kingsway Junior School, Watford
- Knebworth Primary School, Knebworth
- Knutsford Primary Academy, Watford
- Ladbrooke JMI School, Potters Bar
- Lanchester Community Free School, Watford
- Larkspur Academy, Ware
- Laurance Haines School, Watford
- Layston CE First School, Buntingford
- The Lea Primary School, Harpenden
- Leavesden JMI School, Leavesden
- Letchmore Infants' School, Stevenage
- Leverstock Green CE Primary School, Hemel Hempstead
- The Leys Primary School, Stevenage
- Lime Walk Primary School, Hemel Hempstead
- Little Gaddesden CE Primary School, Little Gaddesden
- Little Green Junior School, Croxley Green
- Little Hadham Primary School, Little Hadham
- Little Heath Primary School, Potters Bar
- Little Munden Primary School, Ware
- Little Reddings Primary School, Bushey
- Lodge Farm Primary School, Stevenage
- London Colney Primary School, London Colney
- Long Marston CE Primary School, Long Marston
- Longlands Primary School and Nursery, Broxbourne
- Longmeadow Primary School, Stevenage
- Lordship Farm Primary School, Letchworth Garden City
- Malvern Way Infant School, Croxley Green
- Mandeville Primary School, St Albans
- Mandeville Primary School, Sawbridgeworth
- Manland Primary School, Harpenden
- Manor Fields Primary School, Bishop's Stortford
- Maple Cross JMI School, Maple Cross
- Maple Grove Primary School, Hemel Hempstead
- Maple Primary School, St. Albans
- Margaret Wix Primary School, St. Albans
- Markyate Village School, Markyate
- Martins Wood Primary School, Stevenage
- Mary Exton Primary School, Hitchin
- Merry Hill Infant School, Bushey
- Meryfield Primary School, Borehamwood
- Micklem Primary School, Hemel Hempstead
- Mill Mead Primary School, Hertford
- Millbrook School, Cheshunt
- Millfield First School, Buntingford
- Monksmead School, Borehamwood
- Morgans Primary School, Hertford
- Moss Bury Primary School, Stevenage
- Mount Pleasant Lane Primary School, Bricket Wood
- Nascot Wood Infant School, Watford
- Nascot Wood Junior School, Watford
- Nash Mills CE Primary School, Hemel Hempstead
- Newberries Primary School, Radlett
- Northaw CE Primary School, Northaw
- Northfields Infant School, Letchworth Garden City
- Northgate Primary School, Bishop's Stortford
- Norton St Nicholas CE Primary School, Letchworth Garden City
- Oak View Primary School, Hatfield
- Oaklands Primary School, Letchworth
- Oakleaf School, Hemel Hempstead
- Oakmere Primary School, Potters Bar
- Oak View Primary School, Cheshunt
- Oakwood Primary School, St. Albans
- Offley Endowed Primary School, Offley
- The Orchard Primary School, Watford
- Oughton Primary School, Hitchin Oughton
- Our Lady RC Primary School, Hitchin
- Our Lady RC Primary School, Welwyn Garden City
- Oxhey Wood Primary School, South Oxhey
- Panshanger Primary School, Welwyn Garden City
- Park Street CE Primary School, Park Street
- Parkgate Infant School, Watford
- Parkgate Junior School, Watford
- Parkside Community Primary School, Borehamwood
- Peartree Primary School, Welwyn Garden City
- Peartree Spring Primary School, Stevenage
- Pirton School, Pirton
- Pixies Hill Primary School, Hemel Hempstead
- Pixmore Junior School, Letchworth
- Ponsbourne St Mary's CE Primary School, Newgate Street
- Pope Paul RC Primary School, Potters Bar
- Potten End CE Primary School, Potten End
- Prae Wood Primary School, St Albans
- Preston Primary School, Preston
- Priors Wood Primary School, Ware
- Puller Memorial CE Primary School, Ware
- Purwell Primary School, Hitchin
- Redbourn Primary School, Redbourn
- The Reddings Primary School, Hemel Hempstead
- Reed First School, Reed
- Reedings Junior School, Sawbridgeworth
- Richard Whittington Primary School, Bishop's Stortford
- Rickmansworth Park JMI School, Rickmansworth
- Roebuck Academy, Stevenage
- Roger De Clare First CE School, Puckeridge
- Roman Way Academy, Royston
- Roselands Primary School, Hoddesdon
- Round Diamond Primary School, Stevenage
- Roundwood Primary School, Harpenden
- The Russell School, Chorleywood
- The Ryde School, Hatfield
- Sacred Heart RC Primary School, Ware
- Sacred Heart RC Primary School, Bushey
- Saffron Green Primary School, Borehamwood
- St Albert the Great RC Primary School, Hemel Hempstead
- St Adrian RC Primary School, St Albans
- St Alban & St Stephen RC Primary School, St Albans
- St Andrew's CE Primary School, Much Hadham
- St Andrew's CE Primary School, Hitchin
- St Andrew's CE Primary School, Stanstead Abbotts
- St Anthony's RC Primary School, Watford
- St Augustine's RC Primary School, Hoddesdon
- St Bartholomew's CE Primary School, Wigginton
- St Bernadette RC Primary School, London Colney
- St Catherine of Siena RC Primary School, Garston
- St Catherine's CE Primary School, Ware
- St Catherine's Hoddesdon CE Primary School, Hoddesdon
- St Cross RC Primary School, Hoddesdon
- St Cuthbert Mayne RC Junior School, Hemel Hempstead
- St Dominic RC Primary School, Harpenden
- St Giles' CE Primary School, South Mimms
- St Helen's CE Primary School, Wheathampstead
- St Ippolyts CE Primary School, Hitchin
- St John Fisher RC Primary School, St Albans
- St John RC Primary School, Baldock
- St John RC Primary School, Mill End
- St John the Baptist CE Primary School, Great Amwell
- St John's CE Infant and Nursery School, Radlett
- St John's CE Primary School, Digswell
- St John's CE Primary School, Lemsford
- St Joseph RC Primary School, South Oxhey
- St Joseph's RC Primary School, Bishop's Stortford
- St Joseph's RC Primary School, Hertford
- St Joseph's RC Primary School, Waltham Cross
- St Margaret Clitherow RC Primary School, Stevenage
- St Mary RC Primary School, Royston
- St Mary's CE Primary School, North Mymms
- St Mary's CE Primary School, Northchurch
- St Mary's CE Primary School, Rickmansworth
- St Mary's Infants' School, Baldock
- St Mary's Junior Mixed School, Baldock
- St Mary's CE Junior School, Ware
- St Meryl School, Carpenders Park
- St Michael's CE Primary School, Bishop's Stortford
- St Michael's CE Primary School, St Albans
- St Michael's Woolmer Green CE Primary School, Woolmer Green
- St Nicholas CE Primary School and Nursery, Stevenage
- St Nicholas CE Primary School, Harpenden
- St Nicholas Elstree CE Primary School, Elstree
- St Paul's CE Primary School, Hunton Bridge
- St Paul's CE Primary School, Chipperfield
- St Paul's RC Primary School, Cheshunt
- St Paul's Walden Primary School, Whitwell
- St Peter's CE Primary School, Mill End
- St Peter's School, St Albans
- St Philip Howard RC Primary School, Hatfield
- St Rose's RC Infants School, Boxmoor
- St Teresa RC Primary School, Borehamwood
- St Thomas More RC Primary School, Letchworth
- St Thomas More RC Primary School, Berkhamsted
- St Thomas of Canterbury RC Primary School, Puckeridge
- St Vincent de Paul RC Primary School, Stevenage
- Samuel Lucas JMI School, Hitchin
- Samuel Ryder Academy, St Albans
- Sandon JMI School, Sandon
- Sandridge School, Sandridge
- Sarratt CE Primary School, Sarratt,
- Sauncey Wood Primary School, Harpenden
- Shenley Primary School, Shenley
- Shephalbury Park Primary School, Stevenage
- Shepherd Primary School, Rickmansworth
- Sheredes Primary School, Hoddesdon
- Simon Balle All-through School, Hertford
- Skyswood Primary School, St Albans
- South Hill Primary School, Hemel Hempstead
- Spellbrook CE Primary School, Spellbrook
- Springmead Primary School, Welwyn Garden City
- Stapleford Primary School, Stapleford
- Stonehill School, Letchworth
- Strathmore Infant School, Hitchin
- Studlands Rise First School, Royston
- Summercroft Primary School, Bishop's Stortford
- Summerswood Primary School, Borehamwood
- Swallow Dell Primary School, Welwyn Garden City
- Swing Gate Infant School, Berkhamsted
- Tanners Wood JMI School, Abbots Langley
- Tannery Drift School, Royston
- Templewood Primary School, Welwyn Garden City
- Tewin Cowper CE Primary School, Tewin
- Therfield First School, Therfield
- The Thomas Coram CE School, Berkhamsted
- Thorley Hill Primary School, Bishop's Stortford
- Thorn Grove Primary School, Bishop's Stortford
- Thundridge CE Primary School, Thundridge
- Trotts Hill Primary School, Stevenage
- Tudor Primary School, Hemel Hempstead
- Two Waters Primary School, Apsley
- Victoria CE Infant School, Berkhamsted
- Walkern Primary School, Walkern
- Warren Dell Primary School, South Oxhey
- Watchlytes Primary School, Welwyn Garden City
- Waterside Academy, Welwyn Garden City
- Watford Field School, Watford
- Watford St John's CE Primary School, Watford
- Watton-at-Stone Primary School, Watton-at-Stone
- Welwyn St Mary's CE Primary School, Welwyn
- Westfield Community Primary School, Hoddesdon
- Westfield Primary School, Berkhamsted
- Weston Primary School, Weston
- Wheatcroft Primary School, Hertford
- Wheatfields Infants' School, St Albans
- Wheatfields Junior Mixed School, St Albans
- Whitehill Junior School, Hitchin
- Widford School, Widford
- Wilbury Junior School, Letchworth Garden City
- William Ransom Primary School, Hitchin
- Wilshere-Dacre Junior Academy, Hitchin
- Windermere Primary School, St Albans
- Windhill21, Bishop's Stortford
- Wood End School, Harpenden
- Woodhall Primary School, South Oxhey
- Woodlands Primary School, Borehamwood
- Woodside Primary School, Goffs Oak
- Woolenwick Infant School, Stevenage
- Woolenwick Junior School, Stevenage
- Wormley CofE Primary School, Wormley
- Wymondley JMI School, Little Wymondley
- The Wroxham School, Potters Bar
- Yavneh Primary School, Borehamwood
- Yewtree Primary School, Hemel Hempstead
- Yorke Mead Primary School, Croxley Green

=== Middle schools ===
- Edwinstree CofE Middle School, Buntingford
- King James Academy Royston, Royston (Combined Middle and High School)
- Ralph Sadleir School, Puckeridge

=== Secondary schools ===
- Adeyfield Academy, Hemel Hempstead
- Ashlyns School, Berkhamsted
- The Astley Cooper School, Hemel Hempstead
- Avanti Grange Secondary School, Bishops Stortford
- Barclay Academy, Stevenage
- Barnwell School, Stevenage
- Beaumont School, St Albans
- Birchwood High School, Bishop's Stortford
- Bishop's Hatfield Girls' School, Hatfield
- The Bishop's Stortford High School, Bishop's Stortford
- The Broxbourne School, Broxbourne
- Bushey Meads School, Bushey
- Chancellor's School, Brookmans Park
- Chauncy School, Ware
- Croxley Danes School, Rickmansworth
- Dame Alice Owen's School, Potters Bar
- Elstree Screen Arts Academy, Borehamwood
- Fearnhill School, Letchworth
- Freman College, Buntingford
- Future Academies Watford, Garston
- Goffs Academy, Cheshunt
- Goffs-Churchgate Academy, Cheshunt
- The Grange Academy, Bushey
- Haileybury Turnford, Turnford
- The Hemel Hempstead School, Hemel Hempstead
- The Hertfordshire and Essex High School, Bishop's Stortford
- Hertswood Academy, Borehamwood
- The Highfield School, Letchworth
- Hitchin Boys' School, Hitchin
- Hitchin Girls' School, Hitchin
- Hockerill Anglo-European College, Bishop's Stortford
- John F Kennedy Catholic School, Hemel Hempstead
- The John Henry Newman School, Stevenage
- The John Warner School, Hoddesdon
- Katherine Warington School, Harpenden
- King James Academy Royston, Royston
- Kings Langley School, Kings Langley
- The Knights Templar School, Baldock
- Laureate Academy, Hemel Hempstead
- The Leventhorpe School, Sawbridgeworth
- Longdean School, Hemel Hempstead
- Loreto College, St Albans
- The Marlborough Science Academy, St Albans
- Marriotts School, Stevenage
- Monk's Walk School, Welwyn Garden City
- Mount Grace School, Potters Bar
- Nicholas Breakspear School, St Albans
- The Nobel School, Stevenage
- Onslow St Audrey's School, Hatfield
- Parmiter's School, Garston
- Presdales School, Ware
- The Priory School, Hitchin
- Queens' School, Bushey
- The Reach Free School, Rickmansworth
- Richard Hale School, Hertford
- Rickmansworth School, Croxley Green
- Ridgeway Academy, Welwyn Garden City
- Robert Barclay Academy, Hoddesdon
- Roundwood Park School, Harpenden
- St Albans Girls' School, St Albans
- St Clement Danes School, Chorleywood
- St George's School, Harpenden
- St Joan of Arc Catholic School, Rickmansworth
- St Mary's Catholic School, Bishop's Stortford
- St Mary's Church of England High School, Cheshunt
- St Michael's Catholic High School, Watford
- Samuel Ryder Academy, St Albans
- Sandringham School, St Albans
- The Sele School, Hertford
- Simon Balle All-through School, Hertford
- Sir John Lawes School, Harpenden
- Stanborough School, Welwyn Garden City
- The Thomas Alleyne Academy, Stevenage
- Townsend Church of England School, St Albans
- Tring School, Tring
- Verulam School, St Albans
- Watford Grammar School for Boys, Watford
- Watford Grammar School for Girls, Watford
- Westfield Academy, Watford
- Yavneh College, Borehamwood

=== Special and alternative schools ===
- Amwell View School, Stanstead Abbott
- Batchwood School, St Albans
- Brandles School, Baldock
- Breakspeare School, Abbots Langley
- Chessbrook Education Support Centre, Watford
- The Collett School, Hemel Hempstead
- Colnbrook School, Watford
- Dacorum Education Support Centre, Hemel Hempstead
- Falconer School, Bushey
- Garston Manor School, Garston
- Greenside School, Stevenage
- Hailey Hall School, Hertford
- Haywood Grove School, Hemel Hempstead
- Heathlands School, St Albans
- James Marks Academy, Hemel Hempstead
- Knightsfield School, Knightsfield
- Lakeside School, Welwyn Garden City
- Larwood School, Stevenage
- Links Academy, St Albans
- Links Hatfield Academy, Hatfield
- Lonsdale School, Stevenage
- Meadow Wood School, Bushey
- Middleton School, Ware
- North Herts Education Support Centre, Letchworth
- Pinewood School, Ware
- Rivers Education Support Centre, Hoddesdon
- Roman Fields Academy, Hemel Hempstead
- St Luke's School, Redbourn
- Southfield School, Hatfield
- Stevenage Education Support Centre, Stevenage
- The Valley School, Stevenage
- The Watford UTC, Watford
- Watling View School, St Albans
- Woodfield School, Leverstock Green
- Woolgrove School, Letchworth

=== Further education ===
- Hertford Regional College
- North Hertfordshire College
- Oaklands College
- West Herts College

== Independent schools ==
=== Primary and preparatory schools ===
- Aldwickbury School, Harpenden
- Beechwood Park School, Markyate
- Bhaktivedanta Manor School, Aldenham
- Charlotte House Preparatory School, Rickmansworth
- Duncombe School, Hertford
- Edge Grove School, Aldenham
- Heath Mount School, Watton-at-Stone
- Kingshott School, Hitchin
- Lochinver House School, Potters Bar
- Lockers Park School, Hemel Hempstead
- Longwood School, Bushey
- Manor Lodge School, Shenley
- Merchant Taylors' Prep School, Rickmansworth
- Radlett Preparatory School, Radlett
- St Hilda's School, Bushey
- St Hilda's School, Harpenden
- St Joseph's In The Park, Hertford
- Stormont School, Potters Bar
- Westbrook Hay School, Hemel Hempstead
- York House School, Croxley Green

=== Senior and all-through schools ===
- Abbot's Hill School, Hemel Hempstead
- Aldenham School, Elstree
- Berkhamsted School, Berkhamsted
- Bishop's Stortford College, Bishop's Stortford
- Haberdashers' Boys' School, Elstree
- Haberdashers' Girls' School, Elstree
- Haileybury and Imperial Service College, Hertford Heath
- Immanuel College, Bushey Heath
- Kingshott School, Hitchin Hertfordshire
- The Kings School, Harpenden
- Merchant Taylors' School, Northwood
- Purcell School for Young Musicians, Bushey
- Queenswood School, Hatfield
- The Royal Masonic School for Girls, Rickmansworth
- St Albans High School for Girls, St Albans
- St Albans School, St Albans
- St Christopher School, Letchworth
- St Columba's College, St Albans
- St Edmund's College, Ware
- St Francis College, Letchworth Garden City
- St Margaret's School, Bushey
- Sherrardswood School, Welwyn
- Stanborough School, Watford
- Tring Park School for the Performing Arts, Tring

=== Special and alternative schools ===
- East Hall School, St Paul's Walden
- Egerton Rothesay School, Berkhamsted
- Elysium Healthcare Potters Bar Clinic School, Potters Bar
- Radlett Lodge School, Radlett
- Redbourn Park Independent School, Hemel Hempstead
- Rhodes Wood Hospital School, Brookmans Park
- St Elizabeth's School, Much Hadham
- White Trees Independent School, Bishops Stortford

=== Further education ===
- Benslow Music Trust
- St Albans Tutors Independent Sixth Form College
