= Stanborough School =

Stanborough School could refer to either of two schools in Hertfordshire, England:

- Stanborough School, Watford, a private Seventh-day Adventist school
- Stanborough School, Welwyn Garden City, a state comprehensive school
