= Potters Bar Clinic =

Mental health hospital in Hertfordshire, England

Coordinates: 51.686561°N 0.178052°W

The Potters Bar Clinic is a mental health hospital in Hertfordshire, UK which has 23 acute beds. It is currently owned and run by Elysium Healthcare. The hospital had two wards, Ruby and Crystal originally for men and women respectively. Since then the hospital has been providing CAMHS Tier 4 Low Secure services for young people aged 13 to 18 on 2 mixed gender wards, Opal and Jasper.

The hospital was rated an overall Good by CQC in 2019 but the CQC expressed "serious concerns" about the standard of care.

There is a school on the premises called the Potters Bar Clinic School with capacity for 30 pupils. The school was last inspected in December 2020.

This hospital has featured in the Mirror newspaper and, separately, in the Telegraph for poor practises and other failings.

Among the numerous mental health hospitals run by Elysium Healthcare is the Rhodes Wood Hospital which is not far from the Potters Bar Clinic and patients are sometimes moved between the two locations.
