= Battery Ventures =

Global technology-focused investment firm

- Type: Private
- Industry: Private equity
- Founded: 1983; 43 years ago
- Founders: Rick Frisbie; Howard Anderson; Bob Barrett
- Headquarters: Boston, Massachusetts, United States
- Products: Venture capital
- Total assets: $13 billion
- Number of employees: 100+
- Website: www.battery.com

Battery Ventures is a global, technology-focused investment firm. Founded in 1983, the firm makes venture-capital and private-equity investments in markets across the globe from offices in Boston, Silicon Valley, San Francisco, Israel and London. Since inception, the firm has raised over $13 billion and is now investing its fourteenth funds, Battery Venture XIV and Battery Ventures Select Fund II, with a combined capitalization of $3.8 billion.

== History ==
Battery Ventures was founded in 1983 in Boston, Massachusetts by Rick Frisbie, Howard Anderson and Bob Barrett. Since its inception, Battery has raised more than $13 billion in capital through the following fourteen funds and corresponding side funds.

Fund	Vintage year	Committed capital ($M)
Battery I	1984	$34
Battery II	1988	$42
Battery III	1994	$85
Battery IV	1997	$200
Battery V	1999	$444
Battery VI	2000	$850
Battery VII	2005	$450
Battery VIII	2007	$750
Battery VIII SF	2008	$200
Battery IX	2010	$750
Battery X	2013	$650
Battery X SF	2013	$250
Battery XI	2016	$650
Battery XI SF	2016	$300
Battery XII	2018	$800
Battery XII SF	2018	$450
Battery XIII	2020	$1,200
Battery XIII SF	2020	$800
Battery Select Fund I	2021	$400
Battery XIV	2022	$3,300
Battery Select Fund II	2022	$530

The firm has offices in Boston, San Francisco, Menlo Park, Tel Aviv, London, and New York City.

== Investments ==
As of 2025, Battery has invested in more than 530 companies, 70 of which have gone public and another 185 have merged or been acquired.

The firm's current investment focus includes:

- Application software
- Infrastructure software
- Consumer
- Industrial tech + life sciences
