= Anti-fentanyl legislation in the United States =

Overview of present and pending US laws targeting fentanyl

Beginning in 2022 and especially in 2023, the United States Congress has introduced and passed numerous pieces of legislation tackling opioids, fentanyl, and the opioid epidemic within America. Many of these bills have been introduced by different members of the Republican Party, and some pieces of legislation have attracted bipartisan support from members of the Democratic Party. Only the END FENTANYL Act and the HALT Fentanyl Act have been signed into law.

== Stop Fentanyl Border Crossings Act ==
The Stop Fentanyl Border Crossings Act is pending United States legislation introduced in both the 117th and 118th congresses. If enacted, the legislation would enable the Department of Health and Human Services to use Title 42 expulsion procedures and the Remain in Mexico policy to help combat the smuggling of fentanyl into the United States. This power is allotted specifically to the Secretary of the Department.

=== Legislative history ===
The bill is most prominently sponsored by Senators Bill Hagerty of Tennessee and Roger Marshall of Kansas, and originally introduced by both senators as S.3959 with four more Republican cosponsors. In the 118th Congress, the bill was reintroduced by Tennessee Representative Scott DesJarlais and introduced as HR X.

In the 117th Congress, the bill was blocked by president pro tempore Patty Murray, on grounds related to the expiration of Title 42 expulsion procedures. The bill has been reintroduced in the 118th congress, albeit only in the house, by DeJarlais as House Resolution 1210; the legislation has presently been referred to the House Committee on Energy and Commerce.

=== Support ===
The bill has received support from the Orange County Sheriff's Department in California, which stated through sheriff Don Barnes that the act "is needed legislation that will bolster the needed enforcement component [to prevent fentanyl from arriving in the United States]". Further support from California in favor of the bill was found in the Malibu Times, which ran an op-ed with the tag "From the Right" arguing not only that the bill greatly enhances the ability of law enforcement to block fentanyl from entering the country but also that the source of at least the raw materials for much of the fentanyl trade comes from enterprises based in the People's Republic of China, and that the Chinese government is potentially one of the forces behind the fentanyl influx.

== Felony Murder for Deadly Fentanyl Distribution Act ==
The Felony Murder for Deadly Fentanyl Distribution Act is pending United States legislation originally introduced in the 117th Congress which has since been reintroduced in the 118th Congress as S.380. The bill, akin to its name, modifies Title 18 of the United States Code, specifically sections 1111, to give capital punishment or life imprisonment to individuals who knowingly distribute fentanyl that causes a death.

The minimum amount of fentanyl needed to meet the bill's criteria for capital punishment is two grams or half a gram depending on the fentanyl variant, and the individual charged must have the knowledge of intentionally distributing fentanyl. The distribution of fentanyl must also result in the death of the victim.

=== Legislative history ===
The bill's leading sponsor is Florida senator Marco Rubio and has attracted sixteen cosponsors, all Republican senators. The bill has also been introduced in the House as H.R. 916 by Texas representative Tony Gonzales.

=== Support ===
The bill has received support from Louisiana locals, as WAFB ran stories of people whose family members lost their lives to fentanyl and have expressed a desire to see the bill passed. Rubio and Gonzales further argued that the Biden administration should do more to prevent illegal narcotics from entering the country, especially those which can tie their origins to the People's Republic of China. Many other Republicans in Congress issued statements supporting the passage of the legislation, such as Josh Hawley, Ted Budd, Joni Ernst, Tom Cotton, and Ted Cruz.

== END FENTANYL Act ==
END FENTANYL Act
- Long title: A bill to require the Commissioner of U.S. Customs and Border Protection to regularly review and update policies and manuals related to inspections at ports of entry.

Citations
- Public law: Pub. L. 118–43 (text) (PDF)

Legislative history
- Introduced in the Senate as S. 206 by Rick Scott (R–FL) on February 1, 2023 (118th Congress); Signed into law by President Joe Biden on March 18, 2024

The END FENTANYL Act (Eradicating Narcotic Drugs and Formulating Effective New Tools to Address National Yearly Losses of Life) is pending legislation named for and targeting fentanyl overdoses.

The bill would require U.S. Customs and Border Protection to update its Office of Field Operations' policies and manuals every three years or more frequently on the prevention of drug and human smuggling, and report any and all changes to its manuals to House and Senate committees.

Though titled to end fentanyl specifically, the provisions within section 2 of the bill do not specifically mention fentanyl, and the legislation states it does not only target fentanyl but also other illegal substances, as well as human trafficking.

=== Legislative history ===
The bill was introduced by Republican Senator Rick Scott from Florida and Republican representative Michael Guest from Mississippi in both the 117th and 118th congresses; Scott's bill passed the Senate by unanimous consent during the 117th Congress on December 14, 2022, but never reached the House of Representatives.

In the 118th Congress, the bill was reintroduced by Scott and Guest in their respective houses of Congress; three other Republicans and four Democrats cosponsored Guest's bill, and Scott's bill was cosponsored by Republican Mike Braun and Democrats Jacky Rosen, Dianne Feinstein, and Maggie Hassan.

The bill passed the Senate by unanimous consent on June 22, 2023.

The president Joe Biden signed into law on March 18, 2024.

== Justice Against Sponsors of Illicit Fentanyl Act of 2023 ==
The Justice Against Sponsors of Illicit Fentanyl Act of 2023 was introduced by Republican Senator John Thune of South Dakota. The bill would enable American fentanyl survivors and civilians whose family members died or otherwise fell victim to illegal fentanyl to bring lawsuits against nations which sponsor the illegal smuggling trafficking.

=== Legislative history ===
Introduced as S.380 on February 9, 2023, the legislation highly resembles the Justice Against Sponsors of Terrorism Act, and to enable such suits, the bill would rollback judicial immunities in the American legal system against nations who engage in or enable the illegal smuggling of fentanyl into US territory.

== HALT Fentanyl Act ==
HALT Fentanyl Act
- Long title: A bill to amend the Controlled Substances Act with respect to the scheduling of fentanyl-related substances, and for other purposes.
- Enacted by: the 119th United States Congress

Legislative history
- Introduced in the Senate as S. 331 by Bill Cassidy (R–LA) on January 30, 2025; Committee consideration by Senate Judiciary Committee; Passed the Senate on March 14, 2025; Passed the House on June 12, 2025 (321-104); Signed into law by President Donald Trump on July 16, 2025

The Halt All Lethal Trafficking of Fentanyl Act (HALT Fentanyl Act, Pub. L. 119–26 (text) (PDF), 139 Stat. 410) is a United States federal law enacted by the 119th United States Congress that permanently schedules fentanyl-related substances as Schedule I controlled substances under the Controlled Substances Act. Introduced in the Senate as S. 331 by Senator Bill Cassidy on January 30, 2025, the bill passed the Senate on March 14, 2025 (84–16), passed the House on June 12, 2025 (321–104), and was signed into law by President Donald Trump on July 16, 2025.

Earlier versions of the legislation were introduced in the House during the 118th United States Congress by Republican Morgan Griffith of Virginia and originally cosponsored by Ohio Republican Bob Latta. Initially introduced as H.R. 171, a second 118th Congress version, H.R. 467, received over 40 cosponsors and was referred to the House committees on the Judiciary and Energy and Commerce to permanently designate fentanyl-related substances as Schedule I narcotics under the Controlled Substances Act.

=== Public opposition ===
The bill has received opposition from some organizations for criminalizing chemically similar substances that potentially can be used for legitimate medical purposes or therapies; such backers of this argument include the American Civil Liberties Union and Human Rights Watch.

The latter in particular highlighted that history might repeat itself similar to the crack cocaine epidemic, in how legislation on preventing crack cocaine harmed black populations with more severe penalties compared to white populations, as more severe offenses would be held out to crack, historically affiliated with black populations, than cocaine, conversely affiliated with white populations.

== FEND Off Fentanyl Act ==
The FEND Off Fentanyl Act (Fentanyl Eradication and Narcotics Deterrence) is signed US legislation which expands sanctions against traffickers and creators of fentanyl. Primarily the brainchild of Democratic senator Sherrod Brown from Ohio and Republican senator Tim Scott of South Carolina, the law passed the Senate though stalled in the House of Representatives. The legislation specifically sanctions, at the direction of the president, key figures in drug cartels and fentanyl trafficking operations, and additionally enables the executive branch to use proceeds from seized fentanyl-trafficking assets for further enforcement of the legislation, and authorizes the Department of the Treasury to utilize special measures to combat money laundering in relation to fentanyl.

The FEND Off Fentanyl Act, though not advancing beyond the Senate as an individual bill, was signed into law as part of Public Law 118-50, a package of emergency spending legislation, which included emergency spending for Ukraine, Israel and Taiwan, as well as the Protecting Americans from Foreign Adversary Controlled Applications Act itself colloquially known as the "TikTok ban." The legislation's success was also used by Brown's 2024 reelection campaign against Republican challenger Bernie Moreno, with Ohio Democrats painting the legislation as a bipartisan victory and a vote for Brown as a vote for bipartisanship. The law, though, attracted criticism from the Cato Institute, which predicted that given the target placed on Chinese producers and Mexican traffickers of fentanyl, Chinese fentanyl competitors based in India would increase in business, warning that nitazene production would increase with increased attention towards fentanyl, and criticizing that the increase in fentanyl restrictions is too reckless and akin to the Prohibition Era.

== Data ==
View source data.

== See also ==
- United States sanctions against China, which includes 2023 sanctions applied to producers of fentanyl precursors
- Modernizing Opioid Treatment Access Act, proposed federal legislation to expand access to opioid use disorder (OUD) treatment
- China and the opioid epidemic in the United States
