= Acadia Healthcare =

American health care company

Acadia Healthcare Company, Inc.
- Type: Public
- Traded as: Nasdaq: ACHC; S&P 600 component
- Founded: 2005; 21 years ago
- Headquarters: Franklin, Tennessee, U.S.
- Revenue: ▲US$3.31 billion (2025)
- Net income: ▼ −US$1.10 billion (2025)
- Number of employees: 28,600 (2020)
- Website: acadiahealthcare.com

Acadia Healthcare Company, Inc. is an American provider of for-profit behavioral healthcare services. It operates a network of over 225 facilities across the United States and Puerto Rico.

The company is headquartered in Franklin, Tennessee. As of 2024, Acadia operated over 50 inpatient psychiatric hospitals in 19 U.S. states, including Arizona, Arkansas, Florida, Georgia, Indiana, Michigan, Missouri, New Mexico, Ohio, Oklahoma, Pennsylvania, Tennessee, Utah, and Wisconsin. It is one of the country's largest hospital systems. It also operates, as of 2024, 165 methadone clinics in 33 states, making it the U.S.'s largest methadone-clinic chain.

Acadia was founded as a private corporation in 2005 by Reeve B. Waud and went public in 2011.

== Business model ==
Since the passage of the Affordable Care Act, which requires U.S. insurers to cover mental health care, Acadia has partnered with non-profit U.S. hospital systems such as Henry Ford Hospital in Michigan, Geisinger Health Systems in Pennsylvania, and the Nebraska Methodist Health System. The for-profit partner typically operates facilities under the names of its non-profit partners, such as Mount Carmel Behavioral Health in Columbus, Ohio, which Acadia operates for Mount Carmel Health System.

Acadia markets directly to individuals with mental health issues, encouraging them to "skip the ER" at their local not-for-profit hospital and come directly to an Acadia facility. It develops relationships with first responders to encourage them to bring people experiencing mental health issues directly to an Acadia facility and with emergency room staff to encourage referrals.

== Operations ==
=== United States ===
Acadia operates facilities for patients with behavioral problems, PTSD, trauma, eating disorders and substance abuse. In 2022, it had about 22,500 employees and a daily patient census of about 70,000 patients and was said to be the largest pure-play behavioral health company. Also in 2022, it opened a children's hospital in Chicago, a joint venture facility in Knoxville, and two comprehensive treatment centers. As of that year, Acadia had a network of 242 behavioral healthcare facilities with approximately 10,800 beds in 39 states and Puerto Rico.

In 2014, Acadia entered the methadone-clinic business when it bought CRC Health, a large-addiction treatment chain, from the private equity firm Bain Capital. Acadia rapidly expanded this business, and by late 2024, it operated 165 methadone clinic in 33 states, making it the U.S.'s largest methadone-clinic chain.

=== United Kingdom ===
In June 2014, Acadia bought Partnerships in Care, a British provider of mental health and social care services and acquired the mental health assets of Care UK in May 2015.

The UK Competition and Markets Authority investigated Acadia's acquisition of Priory Group over concerns on its impact on competition. It sold 22 behavioral health facilities for £320 million to BC Partners in October 2016.

== Legal and ethical issues ==
In 2019, Acadia paid $17 million to resolve the allegations made by federal prosecutors in West Virginia that the company had overbilled Medicaid for blood and urine tests.

Acadia formerly operated, through its subsidiary Youth and Family Centered Services of New Mexico, a facility known as Desert Hills. In 2019, Acadia shut down the facility after revelations of sexual abuse. Acadia ultimately settled five lawsuits arising from abuse at the facility. The included one suit, filed by the guardians of a New Mexico minor, in which a Rio Arriba County, New Mexico jury ordered Acadia to pay $405 million in compensatory and punitive damages; in October 2023, Acadia reached an agreement to settle this case and two others for $400 million, without admitting liability.

In January 2024, the Utah Department of Health and Human Services ordered Midvale's Highland Ridge Hospital to hire an independent monitor for ten hours a week to oversee safety compliance. After another series of safety violations in February, licensing officials required Highland to increase oversight to 40 hours per week. In April 2024, Acadia announced plans to close the facility the following month.

In June 2024, Acadia and fellow for-profit Universal Health Services were found by the Senate Committee on Finance and the Senate Committee on Health, Education, Labor, and Pensions to have endangered the welfare of children in their facilities as a result of a business model that optimized revenue instead of optimizing care. The committees' report stated the problems "occur inevitably and by design: they are the direct causal result of a business model that has the incentive to treat children as payouts and provide less than adequate safety and behavioral health treatment in order to maximize operating and profit margin".

Acadia has been criticized for detaining patients in its facilities against their will, even when holding them was not medically necessary. Patients have been held under mental health laws designed to protect them from being a danger to themselves or others, thus increasing payments to the company. Some were released only after a formal complaint or a lawsuit.

In September 2024, Acadia agreed to pay $19.84 million to settle the U.S. Securities and Exchange Commission (SEC)'s allegations of numerous legal violations, including a false billing for medically unnecessary inpatient services. It also was penalized $1.39 million for preventing whistleblowers from coming forward.

Acadia has actively lobbied against bipartisan proposal in the U.S. Congress to expand access to methadone treatment by allowing opioid use disorder patients to pick up methadone at pharmacies, rather than going to clinics.

In December 2024, The New York Times published an investigative report, based on 60 interviews with current and former employees at Acadia's methadone facilities, that found that Acadia personnel frequently falsified medical records used for billing, and often gave methadone to people who did not have opioid addictions but were dependent on other drugs. The report also found the company's methadone counselors carry large caseloads, sometimes more than twice the limits set by state regulators.

On February 13, 2025, Acadia Healthcare announced the closure of Timberline Knolls, a mental health treatment facility in Lemont, Illinois. The decision comes after multiple allegations of misconduct and legal challenges. In 2018, a licensed counselor at the facility was accused of sexually assaulting several patients, allegedly admitting to going "too far" with a 29-year-old patient during three separate therapy sessions. In 2023, another former patient filed a lawsuit against Timberline Knolls, alleging she was repeatedly raped by an employee while receiving treatment for bipolar disorder, borderline personality disorder, and suicidal thoughts.
