= Wheelchairs of Hope =

- Founded: 2013
- Type: Non-profit
- Headquarters: Kfar Saba, Israel
- Key people: Pablo Kaplan (co-founder), Chava Rotshtein (co-founder), Naomi Gefen(rehab specialist) Erez Giladi (engineer) Aaron Ciechanover (advisory board member), Richard Roberts (advisory board member), Ron Prosor (advisory board member)
- Website: wheelchairsofhope.org

Wheelchairs of Hope is an Israeli non-profit organization. Established in 2013, it develops and distributes low-cost wheelchairs for children in low-resource environments.

== Overview ==
Wheelchairs of Hope was founded in 2013 by Pablo Kaplan and Chava Rotshtein, former executives at Keter Plastic. It develops and distributes affordable wheelchairs for children with disabilities in regions with limited access to mobility aids. The organization designed a lightweight, durable wheelchair suitable for basic use on rough terrain. The chairs meet international standards and are shipped in parts for local assembly. Its work supports improved mobility and access to education, in line with the United Nations' 2030 Sustainable Development Goals.

The development process was supported by the clinical team from the ALYN Pediatric Rehabilitation Hospital in Jerusalem and is supported by an advisory board including Aaron Ciechanover and Richard Roberts, both Nobel Prize laureates, as well as Ron Prosor. As of 2025, the organization has distributed wheelchairs in 28 countries.
