= Alison Balsom =

English trumpeter (born 1978)

Alison Balsom OBE
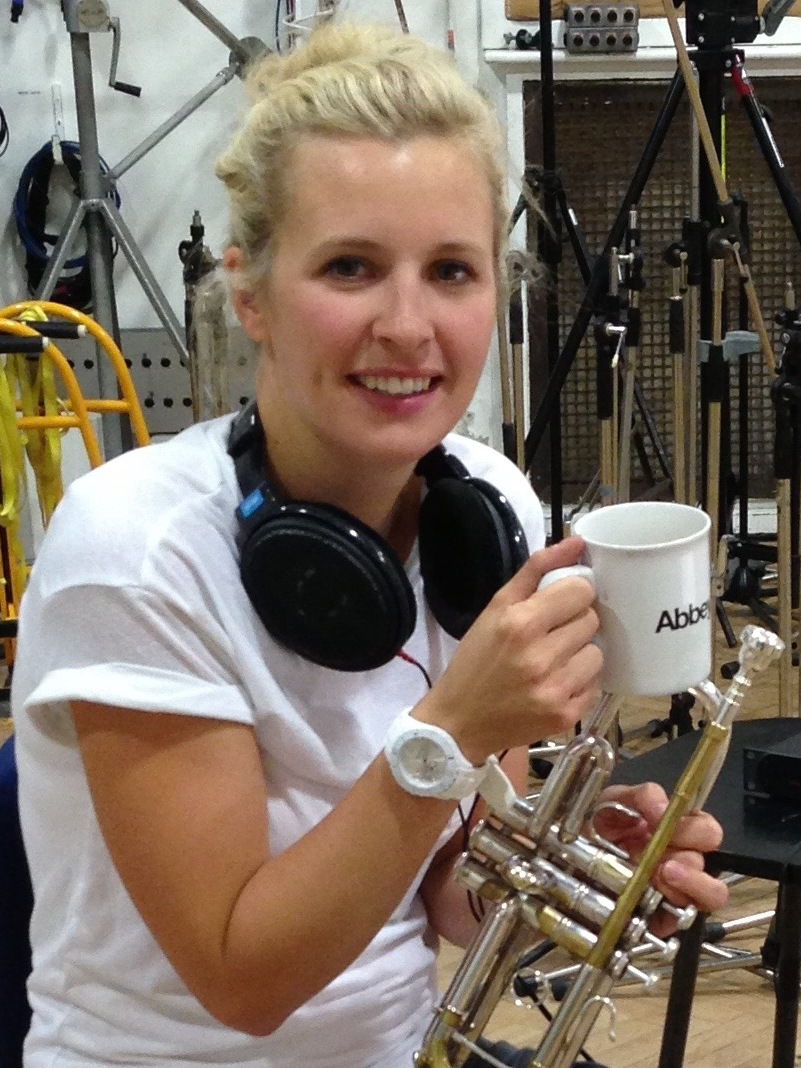
- Balsom recording at Abbey Road Studios in 2013

Background information
- Born: Alison Louise Balsom; 7 October 1978 (age 48); Hitchin, Hertfordshire, England
- Genre: Classical
- Occupations: Musician, educator
- Instrument: Trumpet
- Years active: 2001–present
- Labels: EMI Classics; Hyperion; Warner Classics
- Spouse: Sam Mendes (m. 2017)
- Website: alisonbalsom.com
- Balsom's voice recorded 2012, as part of an audio description of the Globe Theatre for VocalEyes

Alison Louise Balsom, Lady Mendes, OBE (born 7 October 1978) is a retired English trumpet soloist. She is an arranger, producer, and music educator. Balsom was awarded Artist of the Year at the 2013 Gramophone Awards and has won three Classic BRIT Awards and three German Echo Awards, and was a soloist at the BBC Last Night of the Proms in 2009 and finally in 2025. She was the artistic director of the 2019 Cheltenham Music Festival.

== Early life and education ==
Balsom was born in Hitchin, Hertfordshire, on 7 October 1978. She attended Tannery Drift First School in Royston, Hertfordshire, where she started taking trumpet lessons from the age of seven, followed by Greneway Middle School and Meridian School, while also playing in the Royston Town Band from the ages of 8 to 15. Subsequently, she took her A-levels at Hills Road Sixth Form College in Cambridge.

Playing in the National Youth Orchestra of Great Britain from the ages of 15 to 18, Balsom studied at the Guildhall School of Music and Drama, graduating in 2001 with first-class honours and the Principal's Prize for the highest mark. She has also studied at the Royal Scottish Academy of Music and Drama, and at the Conservatoire de Paris with Håkan Hardenberger.

== Career ==
Balsom has been a professional solo classical trumpeter since 2001. She is a former BBC Radio 3 New Generation Artist, during which time she performed much of the major concerto repertoire for solo trumpet and orchestra with all of the BBC Orchestras, and she released her debut album with EMI Classics in 2002. In 2005, she released her second disc, Bach Works for Trumpet, as part of a contract with EMI Classics. In 2006, Balsom won "Young British Classical Performer" at the Classical BRIT Awards and was awarded the 'Classic FM Listeners' Choice Award' at the Classic FM Gramophone Awards. She won "Female Artist of the Year" at the 2009 and 2011 Classical BRIT Awards.

Her third album (the second disc in the EMI contract), Caprice, was released in September 2006, and her Italian Concertos disc was on the list of New York Times albums of the year. Balsom was a soloist at the 2009 Last Night of the Proms, performing, among other pieces, Haydn's Trumpet Concerto with the BBC Symphony Orchestra and a jazz arrangement of George Gershwin's "They Can't Take That Away from Me" with mezzo-soprano Sarah Connolly.

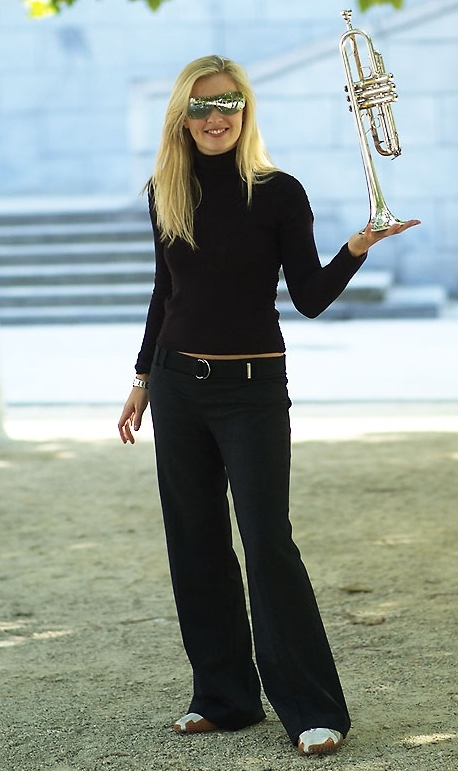
Balsom in 2011

In collaboration with playwright Samuel Adamson, Balsom devised Gabriel, a play using the music of The Fairy-Queen and other pieces by Henry Purcell and George-Frideric Handel, which she performed with actors and The English Concert as part of the 2013 summer season at Shakespeare's Globe.

Balsom was the principal trumpet of the London Chamber Orchestra. Her main trumpet is a Bob Malone-converted Bach C trumpet. About her natural trumpet playing, Balsom said in 2014: "I have been playing since I was in the 3rd year at the Guildhall School of Music and Drama – so since I was 21. I just fell in love with this instrument as soon as I started learning it, as it makes total sense of the whole Baroque era in terms of phrasing, colour and the difference in keys and certain notes of the scale, which you lose on a modern instrument such as the piccolo trumpet. I play various different makes but my favourite is by Egger of Switzerland."

She is a Visiting Professor of Trumpet at the Guildhall School of Music and Drama.

She gave the world premiere of Qigang Chen's Joie éternelle for solo trumpet and orchestra at the 2014 BBC Proms, and Guy Barker's Lanterne of Light trumpet concerto at the 2015 BBC Proms. In addition to 14 years of solo appearances at the Proms, Balsom has also appeared at the iTunes Festival, Latitude Festival, Henley Festival, Un Violon Sur le Sable, France and Wege durch das Land, Germany.

In 2014 Balsom was chosen as one of 27 artists, including Stevie Wonder, Elton John, Florence Welch, and Sam Smith, to feature in one of BBC Music's first broadcasts, an extravagant cover of the 1966 Beach Boys classic, "God Only Knows", under the name of The Impossible Orchestra. This track marked a first-time collaboration between the Warner, Sony and Universal Music labels.

She appeared on BBC Radio 4's long-running Desert Island Discs programme on 4 October 2015; her favourite piece of music was Bach's Brandenburg Concerto No. 5 in D major, her favourite book The Complete Scores of Bach, and her luxury item a trumpet.

In September 2025 Balsom was the guest for the BBC Radio 4 programme This Cultural Life, for which her musical choices included Dizzy Gillespie, Bach's Brandenburg Concertos led from the harpsichord by Trevor Pinnock, and the Trumpet Concertos by Wynton Marsalis.

=== Television presenter ===
In 2014 she returned to BBC Young Musician of the Year as a presenter of the category finals and semi-final of the competition alongside Miloš Karadaglić. In 2016, she co-presented BBC Young Musician with Clemency Burton-Hill.

=== Festival director ===
Balsom succeeded Richard Rodney Bennett as President of Deal, Kent Festival in 2015. She was artistic director of the 2019 Cheltenham Music Festival, then stepped down in July 2019 to concentrate on performing and recording.

=== Retirement ===
Balsom announced in August 2025 that she would retire from concert performances at the end of the 2025 BBC Proms, citing the time commitment behind performing as a soloist, and that "the repertoire for the trumpet is basically too small to continue exploring over and over again". On 13 September Balsom performed Hummel's Trumpet Concerto in E-flat major at the Last Night of the Proms.

== Honours and awards ==
Balsom was appointed an Officer of the Order of the British Empire (OBE) in the 2016 Birthday Honours for services to music.

She has been awarded honorary doctorates from the University of Leicester (2015) and Anglia Ruskin University, and is an Honorary Fellow of the Guildhall School of Music and Drama.

== Personal life ==
Balsom has a son with the English conductor Edward Gardner. In 2017 she married film director Sam Mendes and their daughter was born in September that year.

She is a supporter, both in person and financially, of the charity Brass for Africa, which brings music education to communities in Rwanda, Uganda and Liberia.

== Discography ==
- Music for Trumpet and Organ (EMI Classics Debut, 2002)
- The Fam'd Italian Masters (Hyperion, 2003) – With Crispian Steele-Perkins
- Bach works for Trumpet (EMI Classics, 2005)
- Caprice (EMI Classics, 2006)
- Haydn and Hummel Trumpet Concertos (EMI Classics, 2008)
- Italian Concertos (EMI Classics, 2010)
- Haydn and Hummel concertos / Albinoni's Oboe Concerto Op. 9 No. 2, transcribed for trumpet / Vivaldi's Violin Concerto Op. 3 No. 9, arranged for trumpet and instrumental trio (BBC Music Magazine, 2010)
- Seraph: Trumpet Concertos by Arutiunian, MacMillan, and Zimmerman (EMI Classics, 2012)
- Alison Balsom (EMI Classics, 2012)
- Sound the Trumpet: Royal Music of Purcell and Handel, also marketed as; Kings & Queens (EMI Classics, 2012), and Sound the Trumpet-Gabriel Edition (Warner Classics, 2013)
- Paris (Warner Classics, 2014)
- Légende (Warner Classics, 2016)
- Jubilo (Warner Classics, 2016) – Christmas Album including Fasch, Bach, Torelli and Corelli concerti
- Royal Fireworks (Warner Classics, 2019)
- Magic Trumpet (Warner Classics, 2020)
- Quiet City (Warner Classics, 2022)
- Baroque Concertos (Warner Classics, 2024)

== Awards ==
- Artist of the Year, Gramophone Classical Music Awards, 2013
- Nordoff Robbins O2 Silver Clef Award, 2013
- Best Female Artist, Classical BRIT Awards, 2009, 2011
- Classic FM Listeners' Choice Award, Classic FM Gramophone Award 2006
- Young British Performer, Classical BRIT Awards, 2006
- Feeling Musique Prize for quality of sound in the 4th Maurice André International Trumpet Competition
- Concerto finalist in the BBC Young Musicians Competition, 1998

== Equipment ==
Trumpet: Schilke models E3L E-flat/D trumpet, E3L-4 E-flat trumpet, G1L G/F trumpet, P7-4 B-flat/A piccolo trumpet, S22CHD C trumpet; mouthpiece: Schilke 6A4a.
