= Badby Park =

English nursing home operator

Badby Park Ltd is a provider of specialist nursing and rehabilitation homes based near Daventry.

The main 50 acres site provides care for people for people with neurological illnesses, acquired brain injuries and spinal injuries. It was rated ‘Good’ by the Care Quality Commission in 2016. There are 85 beds, a hydrotherapy pool, a gym, a therapy and wellbeing centre and private consulting rooms.

It also runs the Adderley Green Care Centre in Bentilee - two centres, Moorcroft Manor Neurological Care Centre and Bridgewater House Care Centre.

It took over The Gateway, a neuro and spinal rehabilitation centre, in Middlesbrough in October 2016 after the Keiro Group went into administration.

Elysium Healthcare bought the company in April 2017.
