= BC Partners =

British private equity firm

BC Partners LLP
- Company type: Private
- Industry: Private equity
- Predecessor: Baring Capital Investors
- Founded: 1986; 40 years ago
- Founder: Otto van der Wyck
- Headquarters: London (Global)
- Key people: Raymond Svider; Nikos Stathopoulos; Jean-Baptiste Wautier
- Products: Private Equity, Credit, Real Estate
- AUM: $40+ billion
- Number of employees: ~190
- Website: www.bcpartners.com

BC Partners LLP is a British international investment firm with over $40 billion of assets under management across private equity, credit and real estate in Europe and North America. Its global headquarters are in London. The firm invests across all industries. BC Partners was founded in 1986 and has offices in New York, Paris and Hamburg. Since inception, BC Partners has completed 113 private equity investments in companies with a total enterprise value of €145 billion.

As one of the largest European private equity firms, BC Partners competes for buyouts and investment opportunities with other large cap private equity firms including Blackstone Group, KKR, CVC Capital Partners, Advent International and The Carlyle Group. The firm raised its eighth fund in 2005, which at the time made it the largest European buyout fund. Raised in less than five months, the fund was heavily oversubscribed. Investors in previous funds supplied 90% of the capital. The firm's most recent fund, BC Partners X, was one of the largest buyout funds raised in 2018.

BC Partners was until recently majority shareholder of Intelsat, the global satellite services provider valued at US$16.6 billion in its leveraged buyout in 2007—one of the largest private equity buyouts of all time led by a consortium of investors including BC Partners and Silver Lake Partners. In 2008, BC Partners replaced Intelsat's chairman with Raymond Svider, BC's New York–based co-chairman. Sometime between 2008 and 2018, BC Partners sold all of Intelsat to the company.

== History ==
The firm, founded in 1986 as Baring Capital Investors Ltd. by Otto van der Wyck, who was also a co-founder of CVC Capital Partners. Originally, BC Partners was formed by Barings to advise funds providing development capital, in particular for management buyouts. John Burgess joined him from Candover, the US and UK buyout house, a month after. The principals of Baring Capital Investors completed a spinout of what would become BC Partners following the collapse of Barings in 1995. Van der Wyck left the firm in 2001, and has held senior roles with firms including Coller Capital, Climate Change Capital and AlpInvest Partners.

Raised / Announced Fund	Vintage Year	Fund Size (USD)
BC Partners X	2017	€7.0 billion
BC Partners IX	2011	€6.7 billion
BC Partners VIII	2005	€5.9 billion
BC Partners VII	2000	€4.3 billion
BC Partners VI	1998	€1.1 billion
BC Partners V	1994	€450 million

== Significant transactions ==
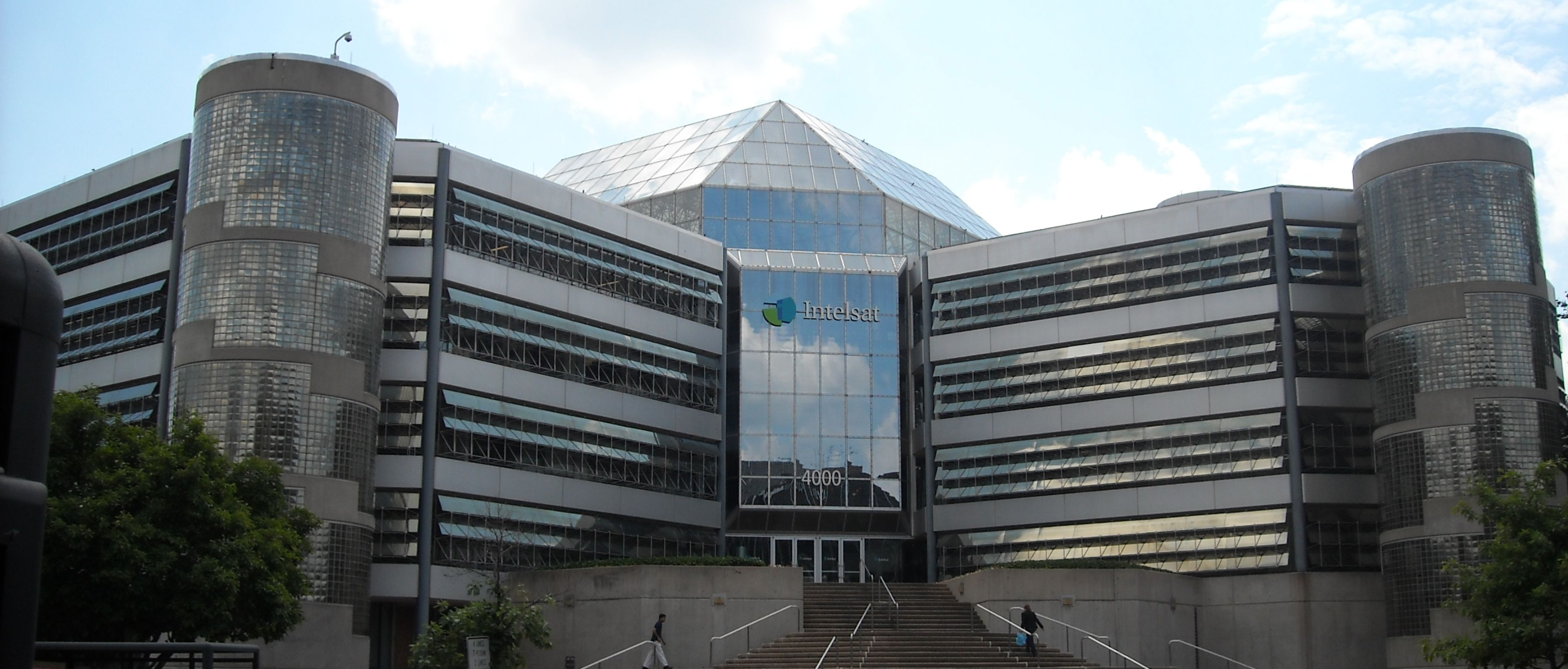
Washington D.C. headquarters of BC Partners-owned satellite operator Intelsat

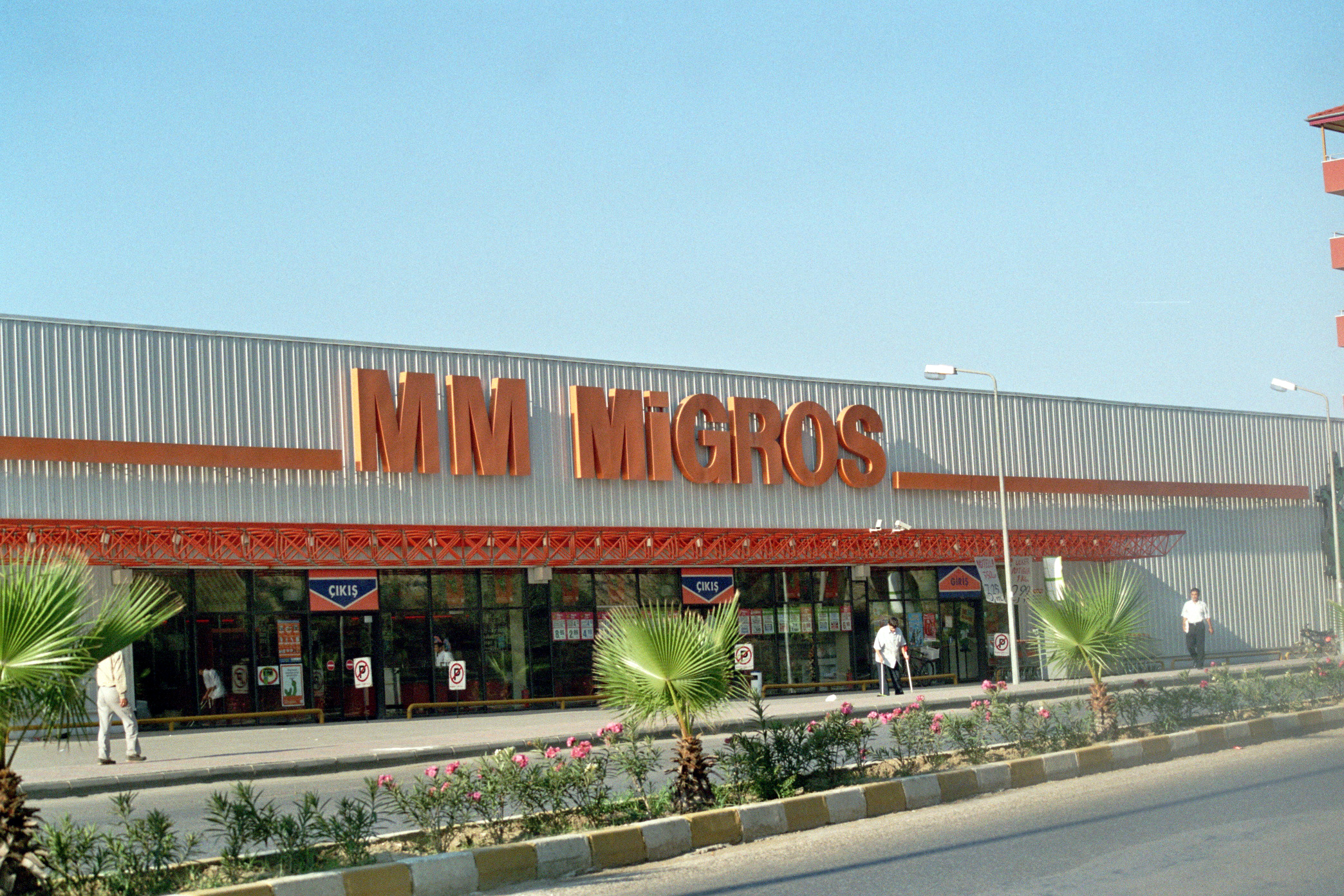
One of BC Partners-owned Migros Türk retail stores. The company is Turkey's leading supermarket chain.

As of December 31, 2019, BC Partners portfolio includes 114 companies with aggregate sales revenue of €145 billion. BC Partners can commit over $2.75 billion (€2.0 billion) of equity to any single transaction. The firm's most successful and profitable realized investments include General Healthcare (leading acute care hospital provider and independent provider of psychiatric care), C&C Group plc (leading seller of alcoholic and non-alcoholic beverages), Galbani (market-leading cheese company) and Phones 4u (leading mobile phone provider in the UK - until its bankruptcy in September 2014).

In June 2013, BC Partners agreed to buy German publisher Springer Science+Business Media for about 3.3 billion euros.

BC Partners revealed in January 2015 that it would sell its 40.25 percent stake in its supermarket chain Migros Türk to the Turkish conglomerate Anadolu Endustri Holding AS for around $2.74 billion.

In June 2019 Chewy, which was acquired by BC Partners in 2017, and is the online pet retailer division of PetSmart, announced its IPO on the NYSE when it was valued at $8.8 billion.

In 2019, BC Partners announced their backing for the acquisition (via the United Group) of Vivacom, the largest Bulgarian telecom. The acquisition became an issue of the media and legal dispute with the company's previous owner, Empreno Ventures, which asked BC Partners to wait until judicial resolution.

On November 7, BC Partners was added to a lawsuit by Empreno seeking to ban the sale of Vivacom.

In early 2021, the firm entered into talks with Inter Milan owner Suning about potentially buying the football club.

Year	Company name	Description of BC Partners Transaction
2022	Fedrigoni	US$3.0 billion for 50% stake
2022	Havea Group	US$1.1 billion (approx.)
2018	GFL Environmental	CAD$5.1 billion for majority stake in waste services company GFL Environmental.
2018	United Group	€2.6 billion for majority stake in telecom provider United Group.
2018	Navex Global	Acquisition of ethics and compliance software and services company NAVEX Global from Vista Equity Partners
2017	Chewy	$3.4 billion for the e-commerce company specializing in pet products — largest e-commerce acquisition in history
2016	CenturyLink	$2.3 billion acquisition of data center operations.
2016	Keter	€1.4 billion for the acquisition of global manufacturer of quality resin consumer products
2016	Elysium Healthcare	£360 million for the acquisition of a portfolio of mental health hospitals from Partnerships in Care and the Priory Group
2014	Cartrawler	Car rental technology platform bought from ECI Partners
2014	PetSmart	$8.7 billion acquisition of pet services and products vendor
2013	Acuris	Acquisition of MergerMarket, now called Acuris, news service from Pearson plc
2012	Sullair Milton Roy Sundyne	$3.4 billion LBO of industrial business engaged in the design, manufacture and supply of specialist pumps and compressors
2012	Suddenlink	$6.5 billion LBO of 7th largest cable communications system operator in the US; sale of 70% interest in Suddenlink held by BC and Canada Pension Plan Investment Board for $9.1 Bn announced in May 2015
2011	Phones 4u	Bought for £700 million; entered into administration on 15 September 2014
2011	Com Hem	Largest LBO in Europe in 2011
2010	MultiPlan	$3.1 billion LBO of provider of health care cost management services
2009	Office Depot	provider of office products and services
2008	SGB-SMIT Group	Manufacturer of transformers (sold in 2017)
2008	Migros Türk	Turkey's leading supermarket chain
2008	Intelsat	$16.6 billion acquisition of fixed satellite service provider
2007	Foxtons	UK estate agency, bought at the top of the property market in May 2007 for £370 million In December 2009, BC Partners lost control of Foxtons, less than three years after buying it, after creditors reorganized the real estate broker's debt.
2006	Brenntag	Second largest LBO in Germany to date
2006	Regency Entertainment	Largest public-to-private LBO in Greece to date
2005	Amadeus IT Group	Largest LBO in Spain to date
2004	Picard	Largest LBO in France that year
2003	SEAT PG	Largest LBO in Europe at the time
2002	Hirslanden	Largest LBO in Switzerland that year
2001	Sanitec	Largest public to private LBO in Finland to date
2000	Mark IV	Largest LBO in the US by a European sponsor at the time
