= Ralph Adams-Hale =

English rugby union footballer

- Born: Ralph Ian Adams-Hale; 31 March 1997 (age 29) Kimpton, England
- Height: 1.88 m (6 ft 2 in)
- Weight: 118 kg (260 lb; 18 st 8 lb)
- School: Roundwood Park School
- University: King's College London

Rugby union career
- Position: Loosehead Prop
Senior career
Years	Team	Apps	(Points)
2016–2017	London Scottish	3	(0)
2018–2024	Saracens	27	(10)
- Correct as of 28 November 2024
International career
Years	Team	Apps	(Points)
2016–2017	England U20	6	(0)
- Correct as of 18 June 2017

Ralph Adams-Hale (born 31 March 1997) is an English former rugby union player who played prop for Saracens and represented England at youth level.

== Early life and education ==
Adams-Hale lived for much of his childhood in the village of Kimpton, Hertfordshire before moving to St Albans for the Saracens academy squad.

Adams-Hale attended Roundwood Park School and subsequently studied physics at King's College London, although "would have been at Cambridge had it been possible to juggle the logistics".

== Rugby career ==
Adams-Hale began playing rugby at a young age, playing junior rugby with Harpenden RFC. He played back row when he was a teenager. He continued up to senior level with Harpenden, and also became a key figure in his school First XV.

Adams-Hale was a member of the England under-20 squad that completed a grand slam during the 2017 Six Nations Under 20s Championship. Later that year he started for the side that finished runners up to New Zealand in the final of the 2017 World Rugby Under 20 Championship.

In October 2018 Adams-Hale made his club debut for Saracens in a Premiership Rugby Cup match against Leicester Tigers and also featured in the final of that competition as they finished runners up to Northampton Saints. At the end of that season he came off the bench in the Premiership final as Saracens defeated Exeter Chiefs to retain their title.

After Saracens were relegated for salary cap breaches, Adams-Hale featured in the 2021 RFU Championship play-off victory over Ealing Trailfinders which saw Saracens gain promotion and an immediate return to the top flight.

Due to persistent injuries and on medical advice Adams-Hale was forced to retire from professional rugby at the end of the 2023-2024 season.

== Honours ==
Saracens

- 1× Premiership Rugby: 2018–19
- 1× RFU Championship: 2020–21

England U20

- 1× Six Nations Under 20s Championship: 2017
- 1× World Rugby U20 Championship runner up: 2017
