= Meridian School, Royston =

The Meridian School

Location
- Garden Walk; Royston, Hertfordshire, SG8 7JH; England; 52.0546°N 0.0106°W

Information
- Type: Academy
- Motto: A Bonis Ad Meliora – "From Good to Better"
- Closed: 2019
- Department for Education URN: 117539 Tables
- Ofsted: Reports
- Gender: Coeducational
- Age: 13 to 18
- Enrolment: 474
- Publication: On the Line
- Website: http://www.meridian.herts.sch.uk/

The Meridian School was a secondary school and sixth form located in Royston, Hertfordshire, England. It was an academy, and had approximately 474 registered students, including 80 in the sixth form before closure. The school featured an all-weather pitch which was used by the school, the community and the local football team. The Pavilion provided indoor changing facilities and access to the tennis courts.

In 2019 the school merged with Roysia Middle School and Greneway Middle School to form King James Academy Royston.

== History ==
The Meridian School first opened as Royston's upper school in 1969. The opening ceremony was attended by the then Minister for Education, Sir Edward Boyle, and the town's MP, Shirley Williams, who was herself later appointed Secretary of State for Education.

A new all-weather pitch was added to the School's facilities in 2009. The cost of the pitch, approximately £700,000, came from the Johnson Matthey Sports and Social Club, the Brian Leslie Racher 2004 Charitable Trust, and other sources. The official opening ceremony was performed by former England goalkeeper Peter Shilton, English football's most-capped player, in September 2009. Speaking at the event, Royston MP Oliver Heald noted: "The facilities in Royston have been transformed in recent years and our sport is now well catered for. Peter Shilton spoke of the huge improvement in the quality of all-weather surfaces, since the early days when as a goalie he had to dress up with Michelin Man-style padding […]. It was so kind of Peter to keep the fixture on the same day as Sir Bobby Robson's Memorial at Durham Cathedral".

In November 2011, the Meridian School joined with Royston's two middle schools, Greneway and Roysia, to form the Royston Schools Academy Trust, Hertfordshire's first multi-school academy. The move gained the new body additional funding and greater freedom from the control of Hertfordshire County Council, allowing greater flexibility in terms of its members' curriculums.

In 2012, English teacher Paul Bushell died suddenly from a brain tumour at the age of 42. The following year, five of his former teaching colleagues at the school joined one of his other friends to undertake a sponsored 100 km walk from London to Brighton. The walk raised £3,000 for The Brain Tumour Charity.

In October 2013, Ofsted published a report which found that the school "requires improvement". Head teacher Michael Firth called the report "flawed" and appealed against its findings, saying, "86% of the lessons were graded as being good or outstanding. But now we have heard that teaching requires improvement". In March 2014, the school's complaint was upheld and the Ofsted inspection was ruled to have been "mismanaged and mal-administered". The head teacher said, "It's a brave school that takes on Ofsted, some people said we should just leave it but we have got to have confidence in the system. It's great news for the town, all students from 13–18 require a good school in Royston and we are it. If we are not doing a good job the town suffers. We do think there is an issue with spelling, punctuation and grammar but we are having a jolly good go at improving it."

It was announced in December 2013 that from the following September the School would be running a new Football Education Programme which would offer both BTEC Level 3 Sport Course and NVQ Level 2 Activity Leadership qualifications in conjunction with local football team Royston Town F.C. From its beginnings, the initiative, in which Meridian School's sixth form students coached pupils from Years 7 and 8 at Roysia Middle School, proved successful and Roysia indicated that it would be happy to extend the scheme to its Year 5 and 6 students.

A major building programme began in the summer of 2014. Roofing and window walling was replaced and the dining hall and learning centre were refurbished. The £2m renovations were funded by the Education Funding Agency.

In February 2015, the results of an Ofsted re-inspection were announced in which the schools' regulator rated Meridian as 'good' overall, adding that the sixth form had an 'outstanding culture of aspiration throughout most classes' and that the teaching of reading, literacy and mathematics was 'often outstanding'.

In autumn 2017, it was proposed that all three of the schools in the Royston Schools Academy Trust should merge, with Meridian, Greneway and Roysia forming a single through school for pupils aged nine to eighteen years old with effect from September 2018. A formal public consultation on the proposal opened on 20 October 2017, closing a few weeks later on 1 December.

The schools formally merged in September 2019 to form King James Academy Royston.

=== Leadership ===
The Meridian School's first Principal was Peter Stone, who held the post until 1983. He was replaced by Graham Kingsley, who served the school between 1984 and 1994. The current head of the school is Michael Firth. In May 2016, Firth formally announced that he would be retiring in July after 37 years at the school; he had first joined Meridian as a geography teacher in 1979. Subsequently, Kim Horner was the school's acting headteacher for two years, before being replaced by Gordon Farquhar in 2018.

== Awards and achievements ==
In June 2007, Arts Council England awarded Meridian School its Artsmark Silver award. The award is a national arts award for schools that "demonstrate a commitment to developing their arts provision in subjects across the curriculum". The school was ineligible for the Artsmark Gold award, because it does not have Year 7 and 8 pupils.

In 2009, Meridian School was one of only 30 nationally to be awarded the Economics, Business, and Enterprise Association quality mark. In the same year, the school also received ICT Mark accreditation from Becta, the government-funded body which at that time had responsibility for promoting the use of ICT in schools and colleges nationally.

In 2010, five Meridian School A-level Chemistry students entered the Royal Society of Chemistry's International Chemistry Olympiad, with one winning a Gold Certificate and prize and the others receiving Commendation Certificates.

In 2012, a team of nine Meridian School students won second place in the Association of Sail Training Organisations (ASTO) Small Ships sailing race held at Cowes on the Isle of Wight.

== Notable former students and staff ==
Notable former students of the Meridian School include:

- Alison Balsom, an award-winning trumpet player.
- Robin Belfield, former National Theatre Staff Director.
- Carrie Grant, voice coach and BBC television presenter associated with Fame Academy and The One Show.
- Simon King, who joined the Met Office as a weather forecaster and later became a BBC Weather presenter. In November 2008, he told Royston's local newspaper, The Royston Crow, "I got interested in the weather when I was about 11 or 12 when I was at Roysia. We did a project on the weather and went out onto the field with all the instruments, and my interest grew from there. I was always very focussed on becoming a weatherman, so when I went on to Meridian School I concentrated on maths and science with a view to getting into university".
- Chris Tidey, a swimmer who represented Great Britain in international competitions and has coached Velimir Stjepanović and Irakli Bolkvadze.

Notable former teachers include:

- Emma Roskilly, a former Meridian School teacher, was awarded the 2008 National Drama Festivals Association's George Taylor Memorial Award for her play Oswiecim.

== Extra-curricular activities ==
Past school productions (most recent first) include student performances of:

- Little Shop of Horrors
- Joseph and the Amazing Technicolour Dreamcoat
- The Addams Family
- Grease
- Les Miserables (2015)
- Spamalot
- Phantom of the Opera
- Beauty and the Beast
- Anything Goes
- Hairspray
- Fiddler on the roof
- Little Shop of Horrors
- City of Angels
- Les Miserables (2007)
- Swing into Summer
- The Crucible
