= Stanborough Park Church =

Coordinates: 51.6845°N 0.3929°W

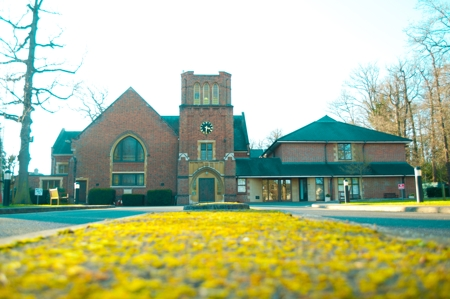
- The church halls in Stanborough Centre
- Stanborough Park Church
- Denomination: Seventh-day Adventist
- Website: stanboroughpark.org

Clergy
- Pastor(s): James Shepley Senior; Heli Otamo-Csizmadia associate

Stanborough Park Church is a Seventh-day Adventist church located in the grounds of Stanborough Park in Garston, Hertfordshire.

== History ==
The foundation stone of Stanborough Park Church was laid on 14 November 1927 in the grounds of Stanborough Park, the erstwhile home of the British Union Conference headquarters, the Granose Foods factory, Stanborough Press, the Voice of Prophecy Bible School, Stanborough College (a theological college which later relocated to the Midlands, with its former building eventually becoming home to Stanborough School), and the Stanborough Hydro Sanatorium. Dr. Rubel, from the sanatorium, was the driving force behind the building of the church, which was dedicated by the British Union Conference president at the time, W. H. Meredith, on 22 July 1928. Stanborough also founded the Rickmansworth company in 1974 and the St. Albans church in 1979. In 2001, the Stanborough Centre was built, adding 4 more halls to the original church.

== Activities ==
In 1961, Stanborough had its first toy service, which continues to the present day. Pathfinders runs on Sunday mornings every other week, and on Saturday afternoons, led by Dir. Florence Allen. Pat Walton, an active member, runs Pat's sale quarterly, with the proceeds going to charity. Pat also runs the "Soup run" every Friday.
