= Elysium Healthcare =

British private provider of mental health services

Elysium Healthcare is a private provider of mental health services based in Borehamwood, UK. It was launched in December 2016 and combined sites from the portfolio of Partnerships in Care and The Priory Group when they were sold by Acadia Healthcare. It was owned by BC Partners. In October 2020 Elysium hired JP Morgan to advise on the sale of the business. The price tag was estimated to be circa £900 million. In December 2021, Ramsay Health Care UK bought the company for £775 million.

== Facilities ==
It opened the 75 bed Wellesley Hospital at Chelston near Wellington, Somerset in 2017. It cost £20 million to build and will provide medium and low-secure treatment rehabilitation for patients with a broad range of mental health problems. Up to 75 beds at the hospital will be commissioned by NHS England in collaboration with Devon Partnership NHS Trust. The site was previously managed by Partnerships in Care. Elysium Healthcare has taken over ten of their sites.

It bought Badby Park Ltd in April 2017.

It bought up Crossley Manor School in Rainhill from Raphael Healthcare in 2017 and later acquired specialist learning disability and mental health provider Lighthouse Healthcare, based in Derbyshire. Its acquisition of London Care Partnership (Supported Living) Limited in July 2018 brought it to more than 60 homes.

In October 2019 it acquired Chalkdown House in Swindon from Brainkind. This is a 20-bed, neurobehavioural site for people with a non-progressive acquired brain injury.

== Performance ==
Concerns were raised about the facilities opened in 2017 at Wellesley Hospital in Wellington, Somerset by the Care Quality Commission (CQC) because there was a "high volume" of assaults by patients on staff and other patients.

The Woodhouse Independent Hospital, in Cheadle, which accommodates up to 39 men with learning disabilities, autism, challenging behaviour and patients with sexual offending histories was placed in special measures by the CQC in September 2019. 90% of ward posts were filled by unqualified support workers and there were insufficient qualified nurses. There was excessive reliance on temporary staff.

Rhodes Wood Hospital, another Elysium Healthcare facility, was rated Good by the CQC when it was bought by Elysium Healthcare in 2016, but was judged Inadequate at the 2019 inspection and the CQC started enforcement action in April 2019 as the hospital was failing to provide safe care and treatment to patients.

Several other hospitals acquired by Elysium Healthcare had, by 2019, run into trouble with CQC and the Welsh regulator and have been given warnings, put into special measures or otherwise restricted.
