= Sir John Lawes School =

Location
- Manland Way; Harpenden, Hertfordshire, AL5 4QP; United Kingdom
- 51°49′21″N 0°20′45″W

Information
- Type: Academy
- Motto: Education for a Changing World
- Established: 1850 (as the Harpenden British School); 1939 (refounded as the Manland Common Senior Elementary School)
- Founder: Sir John Bennett Lawes
- Department for Education URN: 137270 Tables
- Ofsted: Reports
- Headteacher: Philip Newbery
- Gender: Coeducational
- Age: 11 to 18
- Enrolment: 1334
- Houses: Austen Britten; Hepworth; King; Lawes; Newton Ryder
- Colours: Navy, Light Blue, Gold
- Website: http://www.sjl.herts.sch.uk

Sir John Lawes School (also known as SJL for short) is a mixed state secondary school with academy status in Harpenden, United Kingdom. The school has close links to three other local secondary schools, Roundwood Park School and St George's School, Katherine Warington School, and to the neighbouring Manland Primary School, and is active in the community and abroad.

== History ==
Thanks to the effort of, and largely at the expense of, John Bennett Lawes, founder of Rothamsted Research, work was begun to start educating Harpenden's youth in 1847. The "British School" was founded on Leyton Road (now Park Hall) in 1850. The school soon began to outgrow this site. In 1894 the people of Harpenden elected a school board to manage the British School, now overcrowded and run-down. A site for a new school was bought for £725 on the corner of the newly built Victoria and Vaughan Roads. The building was completed in 1896 and opened on 12 January 1897, with room for 140 boys at the northern end, 120 girls at the southern end and 140 infants in the centre.

In 1919, the Boys', Girls' and Infants' departments at Victoria Road School were reorganised into Senior Mixed School and Junior Mixed School. A campaign began for a new school and Hertfordshire County Council purchased land on Manland Common. Several new designs were considered for providing new senior and junior schools on the Manland sites.

In 1938, the building of the new schools began. Building was completed in the summer of 1939, but by September, when the schools were to open, the Second World War had been declared—the buildings' design, with reinforced basements and thick solid brick walls, reflects the public's wariness of the looming conflict. Arthur Watts took up duties as Headmaster of Manland Common Senior Elementary School, but the opening had to be delayed for a week until 21 September 1939 to arrange for accommodation of evacuees. When the new term began without ceremony, the Manland School senior pupils had to share the buildings with evacuees from the Hugh Myddleton School, London.

In 1982, the name of the school was changed from "Manland Secondary School" to "Sir John Lawes School" in honour of its founder.

== House system ==
The school is split into seven houses, Austen (Red), Britten (Yellow), Hepworth, (Green), King (Silver), Lawes (Orange), Newton (Blue) and Ryder (Purple), named for Jane Austen, Benjamin Britten, Barbara Hepworth, Martin Luther King Jr., John Bennet Lawes, Isaac Newton and Sue Ryder respectively.

Each academic year the house cup is contested between the houses, in a variety of events, each house having one signature event amongst others. This culminates in the school wide sports day, where all results are fed into the house point system, before the overall winner is announced at the final assembly on the last day of the year.

== Grounds and facilities ==
The school has a reasonably sized field, large enough for two football pitches and a cricket pitch, and extensive sports facilities, including a large gymnasium, six all-weather tennis courts and an all-weather hockey pitch.By virtue of its Media and Arts speciality the school has media and creative facilities comprising television and media studios, including virtual studios and location filming and recording equipment. The school also houses a well equipped dance studio, its own animal studies area, and theatre/cinema facilities as well as numerous computing suites.

== Values ==
The Sir John Lawes ACE identifies the target values of the school;

- Achievement in academic, artistic, sporting, cultural and other forms with a focus on teaching and learning.
- Care for students, staff and others beyond the school community.
- Excellent standards, manners, honesty, personal integrity and uniform

The school encourages international relations through links with partner schools in Zambia, The United States of America, Singapore, France and Germany.

The school has an Education for Sustainable Development (ESD) and Global Dimension Action Plan in which there are clearly defined actions and responsibilities and a section of the School Development Plan is also dedicated to sustainability.

== Achievements ==
=== Academic ===
Sir John Lawes School is classed as 'Outstanding' by Ofsted and holds 3 specialisms; Media & Arts, Science and Training school status. Over 90% of students achieve the expected national curriculum level or higher in English, Maths and Science by the end of Key Stage 3, with all students achieving five or more GCSE passes or equivalent, and over 80% of students achieve five or more GCSE passes at grades A*-C.

=== Other ===
The school is part of the Scholars' Education Trust which consists of Sir John Lawes, Samuel Ryder Academy, Robert Barclay Academy, Harpenden Academy and Priory Academy, Dunstable.

Sir John Lawes also supports other schools as a National Support School. National Support Schools are outstanding schools that have been asked by the National College for Leadership to use their knowledge and experience of teaching to provide additional capacity to schools in challenging circumstances.

They first worked as a support school for Bushey Hall School in Hertfordshire as it became Bushey Academy and since Easter 2011 the school has been the official sponsors of the Samuel Ryder Academy in St Albans, Hertfordshire's first all-through school and, more recently, Sheredes School in Hoddesdon, now the Robert Barclay Academy.

Sir John Lawes has also received a number of awards including the International School Award, Artsmark Gold Award, Eco-Schools Green Flag Award, SSAT Educational Outcomes Award, Inspiring Hertfordshire Award and the Secondary Geography Quality Mark.

The senior football team won the St Albans District Cup in 2007, 2010 and 2011, and the County Cup in 2008.

The Science Organic Vegetable Garden has won Second Prize in Harpenden in Bloom.

In 2008, a team of students participating in the Engineering Education Scheme were selected by a panel of judges to represent The Eastern Region in the February 2009 National level of the BA CREST Awards, with their work on the Eurofighter Typhoon in partnership with SELEX Galileo. On 6 March 2009, the team was presented with an award for being Highly Commended at the Big Bang 2009.

== Alumni ==
Past students of the school include:

- Sigma, musical duo
- Richie Driss, children's television presenter, including Blue Peter
- Jonathan Vernon-Smith - Presenter, BBC Three Counties Radio & BBC Radio Northampton.

== International Relations ==
The school is internationally recognised and holds many links with foreign schools and institutions. Most notable of these are the annual exchange programmes with the Upper Dublin High School in Pennsylvania, and the exchange trips with the Elizabeth-Langasser-Gymnassium, Alzey Germany, and the École-Jules-Ferry, Cosne-Cours-sur-Loire, France, due to Harpendens own connections with the relative towns. The school also has close ties with the Ndeke High School of Zambia, regularly sending students to experience how education in Zambia differs to education in Britain.
