= Greneway Middle School, Royston =

Coordinates: 52.0535°N 0.0134°W

Greneway Middle School
- Royston, Hertfordshire, SG8 7JF; England

Information
- Type: Academy
- Motto: Together Everyone Achieves More
- Established: 9 September 1969
- Department for Education URN: 137658 Tables
- Ofsted: Reports
- Gender: Coeducational
- Age: 9 to 13
- Enrolment: 444
- Houses: Crow; Ermine; Rose; Stag
- Website: https://web.archive.org/web/20160402163251/http://www.greneway.herts.sch.uk/

The Greneway Middle School was a middle school in Royston, Hertfordshire, England, which has been combined with Roysia Middle School and Meridian School to form King James Academy Royston.

== History ==
The school first opened on 9 September 1969 after the Hertfordshire County Council's introduction of a three-tier system of first, middle and upper schools. Its opening ceremony was hosted on 3 July 1970 by Royston MP Shirley Williams, who was later appointed Secretary of State for Education. The school building had housed the Royston Secondary School (for pupils 11 to 16 years old) since 1954, when it was built. The school's name is a reference to the Grene Highway which had linked Royston and the surrounding villages.

The Hexagon, a wooden shelter designed to provide pupils with peace and quiet at break times, was installed in 2007. According to a school spokesperson, "The children are really enjoying the Hexagon. They can use it for reading or as somewhere quiet to go at break times. It is a good shelter if the pupils are outside at break in the winter and it will be lovely in the summer". The Friends of Greneway School (FoGs) contributed £4,000 towards its construction.

The school implemented an active-listener programme which trained pupils, primarily beginning Year 6, in counseling fellow students who were experiencing bullying or other emotional issues; trained student counselors wore a "Peer Mentor" badge identifying them to pupils needing help. Greneway's active-listener co-ordinator said in October 2007 that the program was successful, ending several cases of bullying: "The children are taught their limits, and they know that if they discover anything serious which is going on that they must come straight to me or another member of staff ... As well as being available to their fellow pupils when needed, the active listeners take it in turns to run a drop-in centre every Tuesday. It gives them responsibility and we hope it makes the school a better place for everybody".

Greneway Middle School joined Roysia (Royston's other middle school) and the Meridian School (the town's upper school) to form the Royston Schools Academy Trust, Hertfordshire's first multi-school academy, in November 2011. The move obtained additional funding and increased freedom from the Hertfordshire County Council, allowing greater curriculum flexibility.

It was proposed in autumn 2017 that the three schools in the Royston Schools Academy Trust merge in September 2018 into a through school for pupils nine to eighteen years old. A public consultation on the proposal began on 20 October 2017 and closed on 1 December of that year.

=== Leadership ===
The school's first headteacher was Ken Charles, who introduced basketball and mini-basketball to Royston when he accepted the post in 1969. Charles had taught basketball at a school in Harrow early in his career under the guidance of PE teacher Joe Jagger, father of singer Mick Jagger.

Greneway headteacher Rhona Seviour later became a school inspector and technology advisor for Hertfordshire. Sue Kennedy retired as headteacher in 2012 after leading the school for seven years. She had served as the school's deputy headteacher before becoming its leader.

Laura Rawlings retired as headteacher in 2018, and remains its deputy headteacher. Rawlings had been head of the science department and the school's ICT before becoming headteacher.

== Awards and achievements ==
In April 2006, Greneway was one of the first schools in England to receive an ICT Mark from Becta, the government-funded body responsible for promoting ICT in the country's schools. According to Becta executive director of educational practice Neil McLean, "Greneway School thoroughly deserves this accolade. It clearly demonstrates how important it is to take a holistic approach to using ICT in a school. By doing this, its investment in new technologies has contributed to improvements in learning".

The school placed third at the September 2011 Hertfordshire Sports Partnership Service to Sport Awards; the county-wide competition recognised the quality of PE teaching in schools and their community links in sport. In November 2012, the school was England's first to receive four consecutive Artsmark awards. An Artsmark gold award was presented by former Greneway Middle School pupil Alison Balsom, who said: "I had a wonderful time studying music with many of the teachers who are in this hall today. Whenever I play music anywhere in the world I remember how privileged I am, and I'm very pleased to be at Greneway today, it's a pleasure to be back."

In December 2013, Greneway Middle School was runner-up in the School of the Year category at the Hertfordshire Sports Partnership awards; the following July, it received the Association for Physical Education's quality mark with distinction. The award was presented by North East Herts Sports Partnership head Jan Wood, MBE, who said: "This is a richly deserved award and I am delighted to award it to Greneway. All of our young people are entitled to benefit from a high quality physical education and we all know that this supports other learning right across the curriculum. It also contributes to healthy and active lifestyles, improves emotional well-being, and develops key skills such as leadership, confidence and social skills." In January 2015, Greneway received the School Games Gold Kitemark award for the third consecutive year.

Two years later, Greneway again received the Association for Physical Education's quality mark with distinction; According to AFPE quality-mark assessor Mike Crichton, "Greneway is without doubt one of the best schools in the country".

== Notable students ==
- Alison Balsom – award-winning trumpeter
- Robin Belfield – former National Theatre staff director

== Extra-curricular activities ==
=== Music, dance and drama ===
Greneway Middle School pupils have participated in a number of artistic activities. In April 2007, two Year 8 pupils successfully auditioned for the Royal College of Music and the Guildhall School of Music and Drama. In June of that year, the school presented a student fund-raising concert to raise money for their tuition (about £3,000 per year). The students played solos and duets, and accompanied the Royston Town Band. Pupils joined those from other Hertfordshire schools to participate in two concerts at the Royal Albert Hall which were organised by the Hertfordshire Music Service.

==== Youth Makes Music ====
Founded by Ken Charles during the late 1990s and organised by the Rotary Club of Royston, the annual Youth Makes Music concerts at the University of Cambridge West Road Concert Hall saw school instrumentalists and singers join those from other local schools. In March 2014, Charles announced his retirement after organising the event for 17 years.

==== School productions ====
School productions included:

- Bugsy Malone (2007)
- Dracula Spectacular (2013)
- The Wizard of Oz (2015)
- The Lion King (2017)
- Seussical The Musical Jr (2019)

==== Greneway's Got Talent ====
The school held a talent contest, Greneway's Got Talent, every two years; in 2008, more than 300 pupils entered the contest. Four acts from each age group performed in the final, which was judged by professional musicians and dancers. Other students designed the contest's stage set and programme.

=== Sports ===
In May 2006, the school's Year 8 athletes achieved "a unique treble": representing North Hertfordshire in indoor and outdoor athletics and basketball at the Herts Youth Games at the University of Hertfordshire's Sports Village. Greneway had the only school team in the competition; the other county districts were represented by elite teams from their athletics clubs. In July of that year, Greneway Middle School's Year 7 cricket team were North Hertfordshire Schools Cricket Champions after defeating Baldock's Knights Templar School at Letchworth Cricket Club.

Greneway's Year 8 basketball team had their 199th consecutive home win in November 2011; they had been undefeated at Greneway since 1995. In June 2015, the school's Year 5/6 boys' football team had "an unprecedented quadruple": winning the Stevenage and North Herts Schools' under-11 seven-a-side title, the North East Herts under-11 nine-a-side championship, the North East Herts seven-a-side title, and the Hertfordshire Wix under-11 nine-a-side competition. According to a Cambridge News article, "and they achieved all of that without conceding a goal".

In 2017, Greneway's Year 7 football team reached the English Schools' Football Association's Under-12s Small Schools National Cup final. They won the title, defeating Manchester's St Bedes 4–3 at St George's Park National Football Centre.
