= Samuel Ryder Academy =

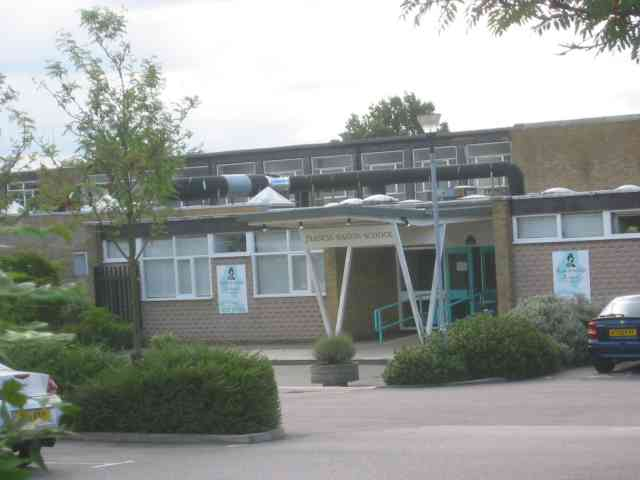
- The school pictured in 2005

Location
- Drakes Drive; St Albans, Hertfordshire, AL1 5AR; England; 51°44′20″N 0°18′40″W

Information
- Type: Academy
- Department for Education URN: 138582 Tables
- Ofsted: Reports
- Head teacher: Mr. Barry
- Gender: Mixed
- Age: 4 to 19
- Website: http://www.samuelryderacademy.co.uk/

Samuel Ryder Academy (also known as SRA and formerly Francis Bacon School) is a mixed all-through school located in St Albans in South Hertfordshire, England.

It is an all-through school with primary and secondary departments for children aged 4 to 19. This includes a sixth form provision which offers students A Levels and BTECs as courses for study.

== History ==
It is named after Samuel Ryder, the English businessman, entrepreneur, golf enthusiast, professional dog breeder and golf promoter who spent many years living and working in St Albans.

== Other ==
The school is part of the Scholars' Education Trust which consists of Sir John Lawes School, Samuel Ryder Academy, Robert Barclay Academy, Harpenden Academy and Priory Academy.
