= Simon King (meteorologist) =

Welsh broadcaster, journalist and meteorologist

- Born: Royston, Hertfordshire, England
- Occupation: weather presenter
- Years active: 2008–present
- Employer: BBC
- Known for: BBC North West Tonight; BBC Breakfast; BBC Radio 5 Live
- Television: BBC North West Tonight; The One Show; BBC Breakfast

Simon King is an English meteorologist and Royal Air Force (RAF) officer, who currently presents on the BBC where he is the resident weather correspondent on BBC Radio 5 Live Breakfast.

After growing up in Royston, Hertfordshire, where he attended the Roysia Middle School and the Meridian School, he graduated with a BSc in Environmental Science of the Earth and Atmosphere and then an MSc in Applied Meteorology, both from the University of Reading.

King joined the Met Office in July 2005 as a forecaster in the Mobile Met Unit, a specialist unit of forecasters who are also sponsored reserve officers in the RAF. After training with both organisations, he was posted as Flying Officer to RAF Benson. He was then posted to operations in Iraq.

On his return, King was assigned to BBC Weather in August 2008, presenting across the entire BBC News output, as well as on BBC World. He still undertakes assignments for the RAF, and was deployed to Camp Bastion, Afghanistan in 2010.

King's hobbies include snowboarding and wakeboarding.
