= Partnerships in Care =

English mental health company

Partnerships in Care is a British provider of mental health and social care services.

In June 2013, the Care Quality Commission failed the firm’s Annesley House hospital in Nottingham against all five standards of care. The hospital has low security and rehabilitation wards for female patients. Patients said that some staff were “brilliant” but that others had “mocked and humiliated them”, and it was alleged that bullying was a persistent problem.

In June 2014, Partnerships in Care was acquired from Cinven (a British private equity company) by an American firm, Acadia Healthcare. In May 2015, the company bought mental health facilities comprising 322 beds from Care UK. By June 2015, the company had added more than 500 beds; it now has approximately 1800. Elysium Healthcare took over ten of its sites in 2017.

The company's portfolio now includes Priory Hospital East Midlands, a specialist hospital in Annesley.
