= Robin Belfield =

British-Bahamian theatre writer, director, educator and producer

Robin Belfield is a British-Bahamian theatre writer, director, educator and producer. He has worked with amongst others the National Theatre, the Royal Shakespeare Company, the Globe Theatre, the Royal Welsh College of Music and Drama, The Oxford School of Drama and the Guildhall School of Music and Drama.

== Education ==
Robin Belfield grew up in Royston, Hertfordshire, where he attended Icknield Walk First School, Greneway Middle School and Meridian School. He graduated from the University of Bristol in 2001 with a First in BA (Hons) Drama.

== Career ==
Belfield was awarded a bursary from 2003 to 2005 as part of the Channel 4 Theatre Director Scheme. From 2008 to 2010 Belfield was Staff Director at the National Theatre and from 2015 to 2021 Young People’s Performance Developer for the Royal Shakespeare Company. He is now pursuing a career as a freelancer.

== Belfield and Slater Musicals ==
Belfield first met composer Simon Slater in 2010 on a production of Treasure Island which Belfield was directing for the Watermill Theatre in Newbury, Berkshire and for which Slater had composed the music. In 2013 the Watermill Theatre staged their second collaboration The Adventures of Pinocchio, which was followed in 2014 by Belfield and Slater's adaptation of Peter Pan, described by The Stage as ‘arguably one of the most engaging tributes to Neverland.’ The following year saw the pair collaborate on Alice in Wonderland at the Watermill Theatre and tour two shows adapted from books by Jonathan Emmett: The Santa Trap and Here Be Monsters , which was described by the British Theatre Guide as ‘a captivating swashbuckling show.’ As dramaturg, Belfield also collaborated with Slater on 'Drift', a dance production for the 'Mayflower 400' celebrations in Southampton in 2020.

== Yellowtale Theatre Company ==
Belfield is artistic Director of the Yellowtale Theatre Company, a company that celebrates ‘multiracial stories and storytellers.’ In 2010, Yellowtale performed Belfield’s play 'Dat Bahamian Ting' (which tells the story of a young English Methodist Minister who travels to the Bahamas for work and falls for a young church member) at the second Shakespeare in Paradise festival in Nassau, the Bahamas. The play had previously premiered at the Nuffield Theatre four years earlier. In 2012 Yellowtale returned to the festival with 'Othello or (or the Tragedy of Conchy Joe)', Belfield’s adaptation of Shakespeare’s tale of domestic abuse and rage. Belfield also penned and directed the Yellowtale comedy 'The Hibiscus Hotel' which was performed at the old colonial mansion of Jacaranda House in the heart of Nassau in 2014.

== Educational activities ==
Belfield teaches and directs at the Royal Welsh College of Music and Drama, the Oxford School of DramaRoyal Welsh College of Music and Drama, Guildhall School of Music and Drama and the Institute for Contemporary Theatre, where he was Principal Lecturer 2021-2022. He is also an Associate Learning Practitioner for the Royal Shakespeare Company (RSC).

At the Royal Shakespeare Company, he worked as Young People’s Performance Developer from 2015 to 2021 and launched their Next Generation initiative which (in collaboration with regional theatres) sought to deliver a UK-wide talent development programme.

He has also been instrumental in the creation of the RSC’s First Encounters productions of Romeo and Juliet (2023/4), Twelfth Night (2022) and The Merchant of Venice (2018). These are 90-minute versions of Shakespeare’s plays aimed at younger/first-time audiences which tour schools. In an interview for the Arts Award’s Voice Magazine he commented ‘as a society we don’t take young people seriously enough.’

He is a trustee of the Attic Theatre Company and sits on the advisory committees of Missing Link Arts and the Children's Theatre Partnership.

== Publications ==
In 2016 Belfield published Telling the truth: how to make verbatim theatre (Nick Hern Books), a guide to creating a play out of heard conversation. The educational website Drama and Theatre wrote that “Robin Belfield draws on his own experience and some very useful research to offer a step-by-step breakdown of the process” and Inkpellet described it as an 'excellent book'.

== Credits as Director ==
2003: Duck Variations by David Mamet | Nuffield Theatre

2004: The Entertainer by John Osborne | Nuffield Theatre; Kiss of the Spiderwoman by Manuel Puig | Nuffield Theatre

2006: A Christmas Carol by David Holman | Dukes Theatre

2007: Oleanna by David Mamet | Nuffield Theatre, Southampton 2007 Charlotte’s Web by Joseph Robinette | Dukes Theatre

2008: Trade It? (10 new plays) by various writers inc. Mustapha Matura | Show of Strength Theatre; The Twits by David Wood | Dukes Theatre, Lancaster

2010: Treasure Island (musical) by Toby Hulse & Simon Slater | Watermill Theatre; Dat Bahamian T’ing by Robin Belfield | Nuffield Theatre; Venison by Tom Morton Smith | Yellowtale Theatre Company

2011: Othello (or the Tragedy of Conchy Joe) by Robin Belfield | Nuffield Theatre, Southampton; The Wind in the Willows (musical) by Toby Hulse & Simon Slater | Watermill Theatre; The Odd Couple (female version) by Neil Simon | RWCMD, Cardiff; Spring Awakening (musical) by Duncan Sheik & Steven Sater | West Sussex County Youth Theatre

2012: Arabian Nights (musical) by Toby Hulse & Simon Slater | Watermill Theatre

2013: The Adventures of Pinocchio by Robin Belfield & Simon Slater | Watermill Theatre; Machinal by Sophie Treadwell | Oxford School of Drama, Royal Court Theatre; Romeo and Juliet by William Shakespeare | Sussex Actors Studio. Vincent in Brixton by Nicholas Wright | RWCMD, Cardiff

2014: Peter Pan (musical) by Robin Belfield & Simon Slater | Watermill Theatre; Sweeney Todd (musical) by Stephen Sondheim & Hugh Wheeler | Chichester University; A Midsummer Night’s Dream by William Shakespeare | Sussex Actors Studio; You Can’t Take It With You by Moss Hart & George Kaufman | RWCMD, Cardiff; Anna Karenina by Helen Edmundson | The Oxford School of Drama, Royal Court Theatre; Hibiscus Hotel by Robin Belfield | Yellowtale Theatre Company, Nassau, Bahamas

2015: Here Be Monsters (musical) by Robin Belfield & Simon Slater | Mayflower Productions, tour; Alice in Wonderland (musical) by Robin Belfield & Simon Slater | Watermill Theatre, Newbury; Walking the Chains (musical) by ACH Smith | Show of Strength Theatre & Circomedia, Bristol

2016: The Santa Trap (musical) by Robin Belfield & Simon Slater | Mayflower Productions, tour

2017: Sapho and Phao by John Lyly | The RSC, Next Generation

2018: The Merchant of Venice by William Shakespeare | The RSC, First Encounters tour

2022: Twelfth Night by William Shakespeare | The RSC, First Encounters tour; The Legend of Sleepy Hollow (the musical) by Helen Watts & Eamonn O’Dwyer | ICTheatre, Brighton Princess Essex by Anne Odeke | Queen’s Theatre, Hornchurch & Bush Theatre; Red Velvet by Lolita Chakrabarti | Richard Burton Theatre Company, RWCMD, Cardiff

2023: Blue/Orange by Joe Penhall,| Richard Burton Theatre Company, RWCMD, Cardiff; 37 Plays Project, The RSC, Beltane by Billie Collins, Go Back Home by Hannah Shury-Smith, Evie of Windrush by Joan Jackson-Callen

== Credits as Associate/Assistant Director ==
2001: Look Back in Anger by John Osborne | D. Gareth Machin | Bristol Old Vic

2003: Hamlet by William Shakespeare | D. Patrick Sandford | Nuffield Theatre

2004: Mary Stuart by Jeremy Sams | D. Patrick Sandford | Nuffield Theatre; Frankenstein by Patrick Sandford | D. Patrick Sandford | Nuffield Theatre

2009:The Power of Yes by David Hare | D. Angus Jackson | National Theatre;Time and the Conways by JB Priestley | D. Rupert Goold | National Theatre; England People Very Nice by Richard Bean | D. Nicholas Hytner | National Theatre

2010: Every Good Boy Deserves Favour by Tom Stoppard & Andre Previn | D. Tom Morris & Felix Barrett | National Theatre

2013: Sherlock’s Last Case by Charles Marowitz | D. Maria Aiken | Watermill Theatre
