= Marriotts School =

Location
- Britain Way; Stevenage, Hertfordshire, SG2 8UT; England; 51°54′14″N 00°10′33″W

Information
- Type: Community school
- Motto: Aim high. Work hard. Be kind.
- Established: 1995
- Local authority: Hertfordshire
- Department for Education URN: 117534 Tables
- Ofsted: Reports
- Chair of Governors: Melany McQueen
- Head teacher: Bethany Honnor
- Gender: Mixed
- Age: 11 to 18
- Enrolment: 1,409
- Colours: Grey and Red
- Website: http://www.marriotts.herts.sch.uk/

Marriotts School is a comprehensive school in Stevenage, Hertfordshire, England. The school was rebuilt along with Lonsdale School (for disabled children) after a grant from the government/council.

Marriotts is situated on a site overlooking the Fairlands Valley. The school playing fields run along the east side of the Fairland Lakes, which offer a range of water-sport activities.

In November 2023, the school opened a new 3G pitch certified by the Football Association (FA).
