= Garston, Hertfordshire =

Village in Hertfordshire, England

Coordinates: 51.6889°N 0.3845°W

Garston
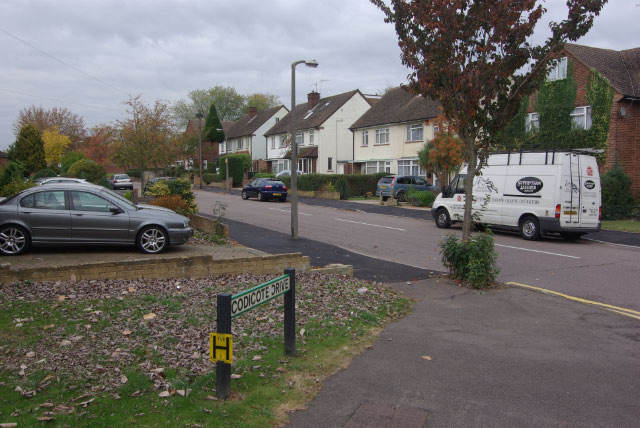
- Codicote Drive, Garston

- Location within Hertfordshire
- Population: 33,000 '417 (ONS Census 2001)
- OS grid reference: TL116002
- District: Watford
- Shire county: Hertfordshire
- Region: East
- Country: England
- Sovereign state: United Kingdom
- Post town: WATFORD
- Postcode district: WD25
- Dialling code: 01923
- Police: Hertfordshire
- Fire: Hertfordshire
- Ambulance: East of England
- UK Parliament: Watford

Garston is a suburban village in Hertfordshire, England. Garston is contiguous with Watford and now, despite retaining a local identity, is effectively a suburb. It is within the Stanborough, Woodside and Meriden wards of the borough of Watford, although a small number of its streets are in Hertsmere.

The Building Research Establishment has its headquarters within Garston. The Stanborough Park Church is located in Garston.

Garston has several large secondary schools including St Michael's Catholic High School, Parmiter's School, Stanborough School and Future Academies Watford, formerly known as Francis Combe.

The A41 is the perceived border of Garston and North Watford; it crosses St Albans Road (A412) at the Dome Roundabout.

== Transport ==
Garston railway station on the Abbey line is served by West Midlands Trains services. Arriva London operated a bus garage in Garston. It closed in 2018, and was completely demolished in early 2022.
