= King James Academy Royston =

Coordinates: 52.0535°N 0.0134°W

Location
- Garden Walk; Royston, Hertfordshire, SG8 7JF; England

Information
- Type: Academy
- Established: September 2019
- Department for Education URN: 137656 Tables
- Ofsted: Reports
- Headteacher: Lisa Plowman
- Gender: Coeducational
- Age: 9 to 16

King James Academy Royston (KJAR) is a through school located in Royston, Hertfordshire, England. It is an academy, and opened in September 2019, as a result of the merger of the town's two middle schools, Roysia and Greneway, and its Meridian upper school. The school is spread over 2 sites, with the Meridian site now being the Senior site and the Greneway site being the Junior site.

KJAR received a "Good" Ofsted outcome in all categories on 23 April 2024, with pupils experiencing a well-designed, ambitious curriculum which meets their needs. The school is also well-recognised for its sporting success, with several of its teams winning district titles in 2023. Most notably, its Year 10 boys football team made it to the national U15 Schools' Cup final in 2023.
