= Icknield Walk First School =

Coordinates: 52.0513°N 0.0121°W

- Royston, Hertfordshire, SG8 7EZ; England

Information
- Type: Community school
- Motto: Achievement * Celebration * Teamwork
- Established: 1966
- Local authority: Hertfordshire
- Department for Education URN: 117278 Tables
- Ofsted: Reports
- Headteacher: Jane Sherwood
- Gender: Coeducational
- Age: 3 to 9
- Enrolment: 335
- Website: http://www.icknieldwalk.herts.sch.uk/

Icknield Walk First School is a larger than average first school located in Royston, Hertfordshire, England. It has approximately 335 registered students and has an overall 'Outstanding' Ofsted rating. The school runs the Rise and Shine Breakfast Club for its pupils and hosts both the Fair Play After School / Holiday Club and the Queens Road Playgroup.

It is a member of the Royston Area Schools Partnership (RASP), which comprises the other seven first schools in Royston and the surrounding villages.

== History ==
Building work, with an estimated budget of £68,400, began in 1965 on the site of Royston's former Militia Camp. The school was initially intended to open in April 1966 as a junior school for 320 children but following Hertfordshire County Council’s decision to introduce a three-tier system of first, middle and upper schools it was resolved that only infant school age pupils would be admitted when it opened. The school opened at the start of the summer term of 1966 with 129 pupils, and was the first in Hertfordshire for the five- to nine-year-old age group. A playgroup opened at the school in early 1967.

In its early years, the school accommodated the pupils of Royston's Studlands Rise First School, which was under construction.

In 1986, pupils from the school took part in the BBC Domesday Project in which they created a contemporary picture of their lives. Icknield Walk's contributors recorded details about their classes and the school's summer fete, of which one pupil wrote:

"There was a Sinclair C5 to ride in. It is battery powered and the handle bars are under your legs. There were other rides we could go on too, there was a Chuffy Train and a tractor ride".

In 2011, the project was digitised as part of BBC Domesday Reloaded.

Icknield Walk First School has hosted the independently run Fair Play After School / Holiday Club since 2005.

On Friday 28 April 2006, the school celebrated the 40th anniversary of its opening. Pupils and staff dressed up in fashions from the period since the school first opened its doors, and a new outdoor classroom was officially opened by the MP for Royston, Oliver Heald. The then headteacher, Marilyn Jones, said:

"The celebrations went beautifully and the children and staff looked fantastic. We had hippies, punks and new romantics. We even had a few Elvis Presleys and Marilyn Monroes. The children and the teachers all had a real laugh. […] We wanted to do something different to mark the 40th birthday so we decided to build an outdoor classroom and, after discussing it with the children, it was decided that we would build an outdoor stage where they could put on shows. Parents have helped by donating plants and small trees to provide shade and colour, and over the next two to three years we will continue to build it up and make it a project of which to be proud."

In May 2010, the school was visited by Larry Achike, a former finalist in the triple jump at the 2000 and 2008 Olympic Games (where he was placed 5th and 7th respectively) and winner of the 1998 Commonwealth Games gold medal. He met pupils and watched their PE lessons.

One year later, in May 2011, the school agreed that the Queens Road Playgroup, which had been operating in Royston for 50 years, could relocate to its grounds, subject to planning permission. Royston mayor Robert Inwood officially opened the playgroup's new home within the school's gates in September 2011.

In November 2012, teaching assistant Terry Hartga was seen clean-shaven for the first time in more than forty years when the beard he had been growing since 1968 was shaved off as part of the school's fundraising activities for Children in Need.

The school hosted a mini fun run in advance of the annual 'Royston in Blue' charity race in 2013.

New climbing equipment was installed at the school in early 2015. Headteacher Jane Sherwood told local newspaper The Royston Crow: "The children love the climbing equipment. It is good not only for motor skills development but it also allows for imaginative development – the equipment can be a castle or a puppet theatre, for example."

In mid-2015 it was announced that the school would receive additional funding to help increase childcare provision in Royston if hundreds of new houses were built in the town.

For twenty-four years the school's annual firework display was organised free of charge by Colin Freeman and Steve Johnson, whose children had been pupils at Icknield Walk when they first began. A special tribute was paid to Mr Freeman at the 2015 firework display following his death earlier in the year.

Year 4 pupils from the school participate in the annual 'Youth Makes Music' concert organised by the Royston branch of the Rotary Club and which is held at the University of Cambridge's West Road Concert Hall.

=== Leadership ===
The School's first headteacher was Constance Mary Bull, who led the school until she retired in 1980. Her successor as headteacher was John McGrellis.

Subsequent Icknield headteacher Marilyn Jones retired in July 2009 after leading the school for ten years. She said, "I have had a fantastic ten years at Icknield Walk, and there are lots of people to thank for that – parents, staff, governors, PTA committees and most of all the children. What I am going to do with my days in September is still a mystery to me but I will think of everyone at the school fondly and there will be a big hole in my life that was once Icknield".

Icknield Walk First School's current headteacher is Jane Sherwood, who has been in post since September 2009.

== Awards and achievements ==
In June 2011, Icknield Walk First School's tennis team reached the County Finals of the Hertfordshire Schools Partnership Mini-Tennis competition.

The school's most recent inspection by Ofsted, the inspection and regulation body for schools in England, took place in July 2014. The subsequent report assessed the school as 'Outstanding'. At the start of the 2014/15 school year, the school held a special activity afternoon, with a bouncy castle and ice lollies, so that its pupils could celebrate the achievement. Headteacher Jane Sherwood said: "We are particularly pleased to achieve an outstanding grade in all areas – this is particularly difficult under the current inspection framework. […] The activity afternoon is our way of saying thank you and well done to the children who work hard and always try their best, behave so well and are rightly proud to belong to our school." Icknield Walk's previous full Ofsted inspection in 2009 had concluded that overall, "This is a good and improving school. Pupils progress well and often attain standards that are above average in English, mathematics and science by the time they leave the school". A subsequent interim assessment in 2012 concluded, "the school's performance has been sustained and that we can defer its next full inspection".

In July 2015, Icknield Walk First School won first place in the Royston in Bloom 'Grow a Menu' competition. Reporting the victory in The Royston Crow, reporter Rebecca Day noted the judges "were 'highly impressed' by the school's enthusiasm and determination to continue vegetable gardening in the future. The pupils plans to use produce grown in the gardens in school meals and projects."

In October 2015, the school was given a Silver Mark Award as part of the Sainsbury's School Games scheme.

== Notable pupils and staff ==
Notable former pupils of Icknield Walk First School include:

- Robin Belfield, former National Theatre Staff Director.

Notable former staff of the school include:

- Irene Cranwell, Britain's oldest regular broadcaster, was heard on BBC Radio Cambridgeshire for twenty-one years until very shortly before her 100th birthday.
- Jo Moxham (née Zinzan), a former captain of the England netball team and bronze medallist at both the 1998 Commonwealth Games and 1999 World Championships, taught PE at the school.
