= Keter Group =

Global manufacturer

- Industry: Resin consumer goods
- Founded: 1948; 78 years ago
- Headquarters: Herzliya, Israel
- Key people: Udi Sagi (Keter Group CEO); Zachi Wiesenfeld (Chairman)
- Products: Outdoor and Indoor resin-based consumer products
- Number of employees: 4,900
- Website: www.ketergroup.com

Keter Group (Hebrew: קבוצת כתר), formerly Keter Plastic, is an Israeli manufacturer and marketer of resin-based household and garden consumer products, cabinets, outdoor entertainment products, and outdoor furniture. The company, established in 1948, has a chain of retail stores throughout Israel and operates 16 plants in Israel, United States, Canada and Luxembourg. Keter products are marketed worldwide.

== Products ==
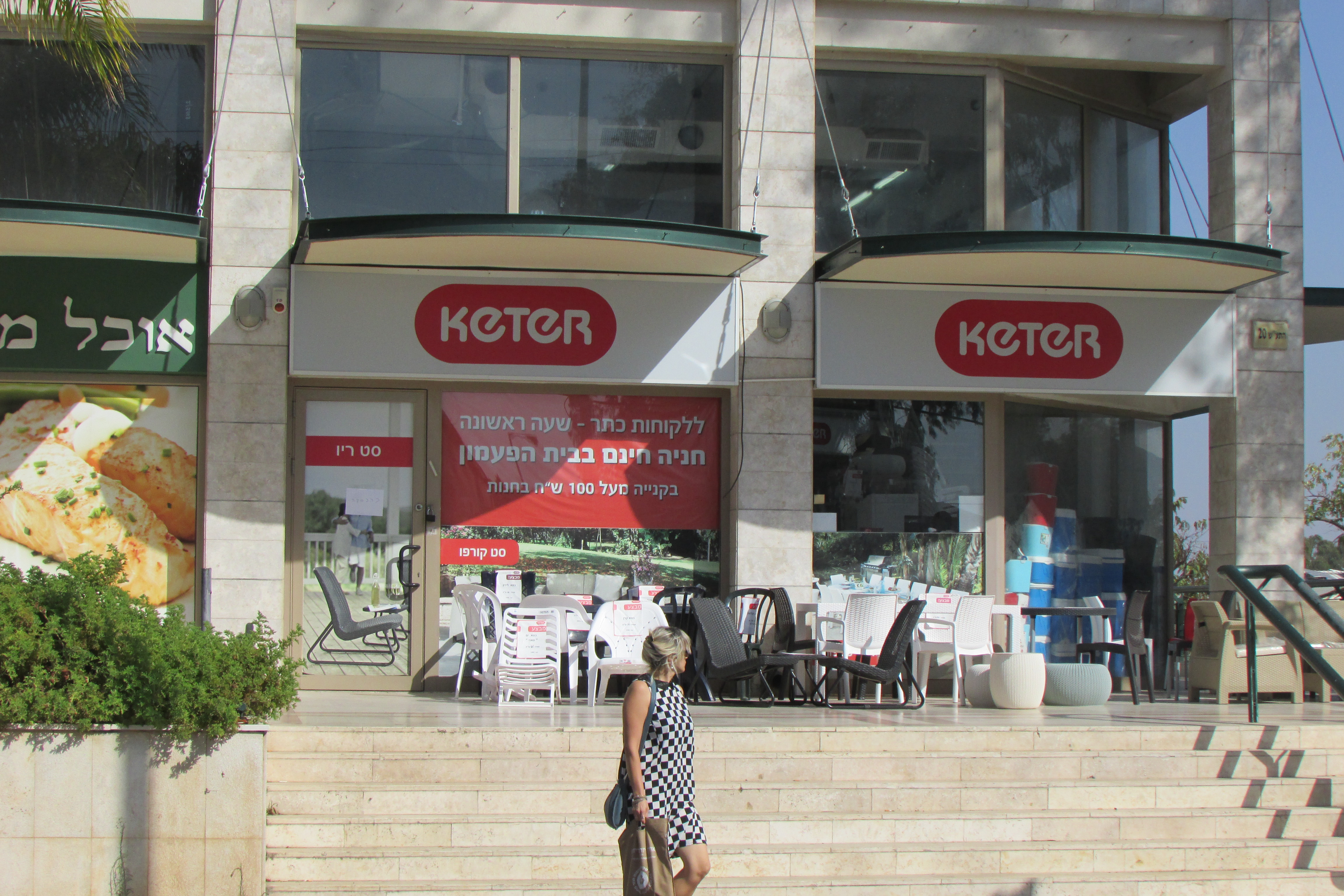
Keter outlet

Keter manufactures household and garden products, cabinets, and outdoor furniture, especially the monobloc chair. It is one of Israel's largest manufacturers of resin-based outdoor and garden furniture.

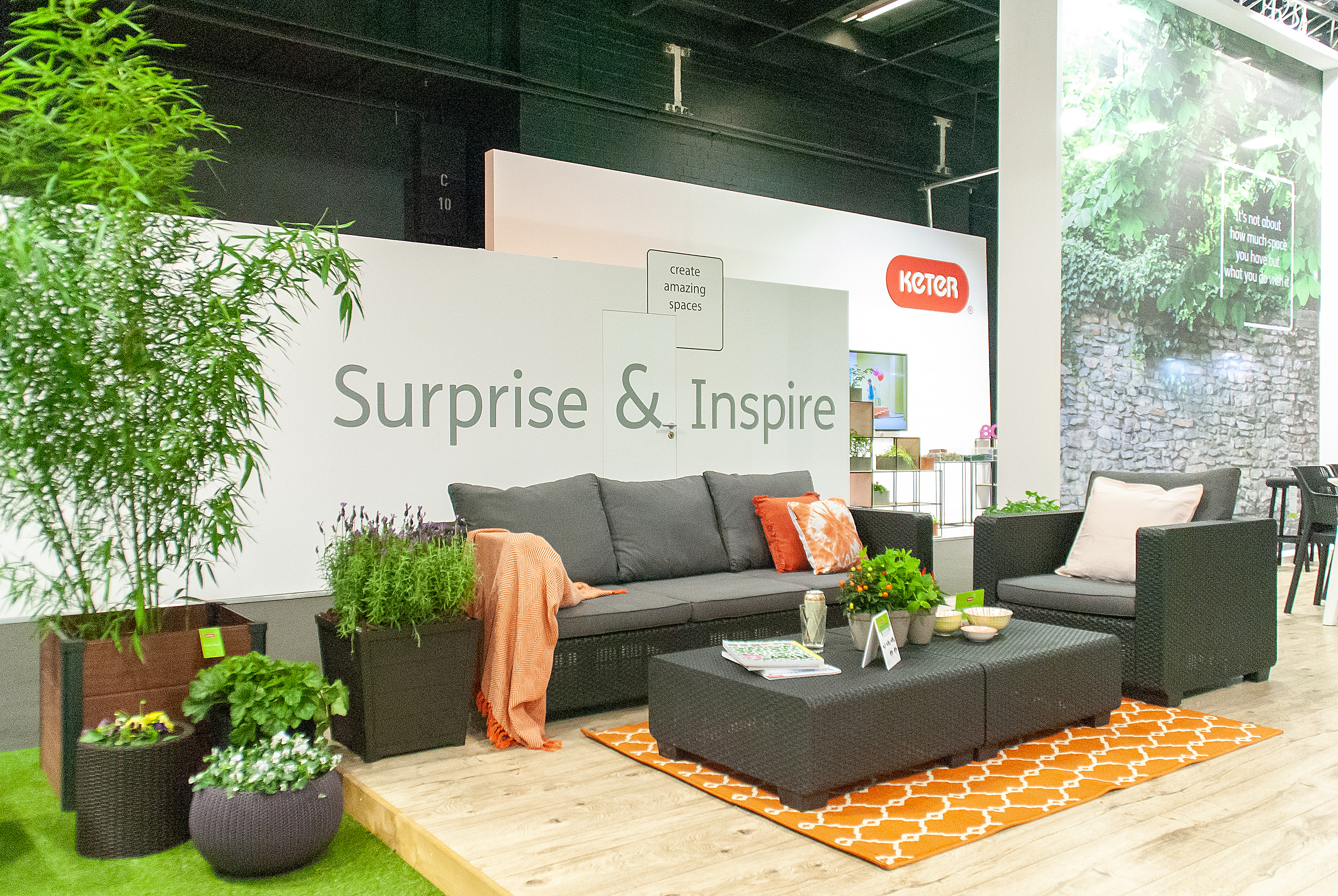
Interior storefront

Keter’s outdoor furniture products include Adirondack chairs, sun loungers, benches, side tables, and rocking chairs. They also manufacture deck boxes, cabinets, and shelving units for indoor/outdoor storage. The company also manufactures outdoor plastic sheds, cool bars, and kitchen carts.

== Manufacturing ==
As of 2020, the company had North American production plants in North Carolina, Indiana, Pittsburgh and in Milton, Ontario, Canada. In 2021, Keter partnered with UBQ Materials to increase the use of recycled content in their products to 55% by 2025. Five of the company’s manufacturing plants that produced 18% of the company’s goods achieved zero landfill waste in 2022.

== History ==
The Keter brand evolved from a small workshop established in Jaffa in 1948, specializing in the production of resin combs, toys and housewares. In 1971, Joseph Sagol (1913-2000) bought out his partners' shares in the workshop. Sagol later handed the management of the company over to his sons, Sami and Itzhak.

Since 1978, Keter has expanded its home product lines to include garden sheds, toolboxes, bathroom cabinets, backyard playhouses for children, and other products made of resin. In 1991, Keter acquired competitor L.M. Lipski.

In 2004, Keter acquired Allibert Sanitaire. In 2005, Keter acquired Curver Consumer Products Ltd, Corby, Northamptonshire, from Newell Rubbermaid.

In June 2013, Keter was one of several companies subjected to a boycott by the United Church of Canada because it had a factory in the disputed West Bank settlement of Barkan.

In 2016, the private equity firm BC Partners purchased 80% of Keter for 1.4 billion euros. The sale involved Keter taking a large loan. At the time of purchase, Keter operated 29 production plants across Israel, Europe, and the United States. In 2017, Keter purchased British plant pot company Stewart Plastics.

In September 2021, Keter announced plans for an IPO on the New York Stock Exchange and filed a draft prospectus with the US Securities and Exchange Commission. Among the underwriters for the offering were Goldman Sachs, Jefferies, JP Morgan, and Bank of America. The IPO plan did not go through.

By 2023, Keter was having difficulty paying its debt from 2016, and BC Partners offered it for sale to recover the debt. It was not purchased.

== See also ==
- Economy of Israel
