= Roundwood Park School =

Location
- Roundwood Park; Harpenden, Hertfordshire, AL5 3AE; England; 51.82002°N 0.37270°W

Information
- Type: Academy
- Established: 1956
- Department for Education URN: 136973 Tables
- Ofsted: Reports
- Headteacher: Katie Barter
- Staff: 150
- Gender: Mixed
- Age: 11 to 18
- Enrolment: 1370
- Houses: Cadbury, Frank, Grey-Thompson, Mandela, Owens, Scott, Wilberforce
- Colours: Red and Black
- Publication: Roundwood Round-Up
- Website: http://www.roundwoodpark.co.uk/

Roundwood Park School is a non-selective state secondary school with academy status situated in Harpenden, Hertfordshire, United Kingdom. Opened in 1956, it currently has around 1300 pupils, most of whom live in the local area and surrounding villages. At the beginning of 2011, Roundwood (along with Sir John Lawes School, the University of Hertfordshire, and Rothamsted Research) formed a charitable trust. St George's School joined the trust in 2013 and it is now known as "The Harpenden Secondary Schools Trust".

== Academics ==
It runs a full curriculum, including all standard subjects as well as vocational subjects for Sixth Form students. Some Sixth Form subjects, such as Chinese, German, Media Studies and Politics, are taught offsite in consortium with other Harpenden schools.

The current headteacher is Mr Alan Henshall, who will step down in August 2025 after 15 years in the role and be succeeded by Ms Katie Barter, who currently serves as a Deputy Headteacher at the school. He was preceded by Nicholas Daymond.

== Facilities ==
The construction of a new modern 'Maths and Music' block was finished in October 2008, which was opened by Johnny Ball.

The school has a multimillion-pound sports centre, officially opened on 7 September 2011 by Mike Atherton. The sports centre is also used for children's parties and sports clubs outside school hours.

The construction of a new all-weather '3G' outdoor football pitch was announced in 2016 and opened in 2018. Having replaced the grass pitches previously on the site, it is now used by Harpenden Colts FC as a training ground.

== House System ==
At the beginning of the 2011 academic year, the school reintroduced a house system after a period of absence as an Olympic legacy. The houses were originally named after colours, but in June 2012, the current house names were unveiled.

- Wilberforce (Red)
- Mandela (Orange)
- Owens (Yellow)
- Scott (Green)
- Grey-Thompson (Blue)
- Cadbury (Purple)
- Frank (Pink)

Each house has a yearly charity week, where money is raised for the three school charities. As of 2025, the local charity is St Albans & District foodbank, the national charity is Make-A-Wish UK and the international charity is Mercy Ships. During the 2024-25 academic year, the school raised £28,379.31 for its charities.

== Notable alumni ==
- Rhys James, comedian
- Ralph Adams-Hale, rugby player
- Edward Corrie, tennis player
- Natasha Dowie, football striker
- Seline Hizli, actress
- Sarah McKenna, rugby player
- Richie Driss, former Blue Peter presenter
- Joanna Dennehy, serial killer
