= Stanborough School, Watford =

School in Hertfordshire, England

Coordinates: 51°41′09″N 0°23′48″W

Stanborough School
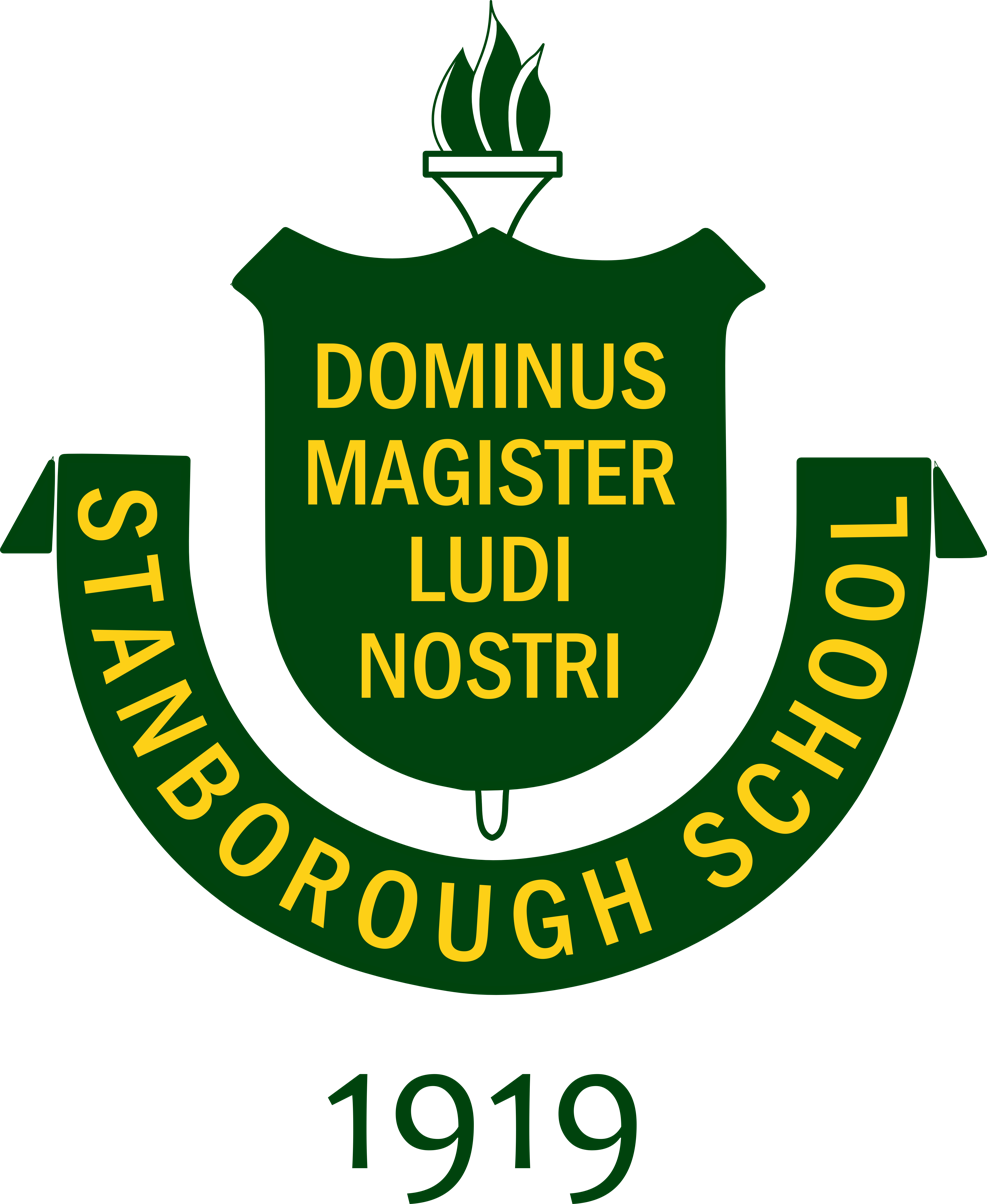

Location
- Stanborough Park; Watford, Hertfordshire, WD25 9JT; England

Information
- Type: Independent day and boarding school
- Motto: Dominus Magister Ludi Nostri (Latin: God is the Master of our school)
- Religious affiliation: Seventh-day Adventist
- Established: 1919
- Local authority: Hertfordshire
- Department for Education URN: 117640 Tables
- Chair of Governors: Pastor E Brooks
- Headteacher: J Liburd
- Staff: 25 Full Time, 2 Part Time
- Gender: Coeducational
- Age: 11 to 16
- Enrolment: School capacity 170
- Houses: Shaftesbury, Livingstone and Grenfell
- Colours: Green, Red and Blue
- Website: www.spsch.org

Stanborough School is a coeducational independent day and boarding school in Watford, Hertfordshire, England. Situated in 40 acres of parkland in the village of Garston, it was founded by the Seventh-day Adventist church and remains under the governance of the church. The school is in the vicinity of the Stanborough Park Church. The school is a member of the Independent Schools Association.

It is a part of the Seventh-day Adventist education system, the world's second largest Christian school system.

== History ==
Stanborough School was founded in 1919. It originally catered primarily to the children of overseas missionaries. Over the years, the school began to cater for a wider range of students. As the school grew, the Primary section moved to a new facility in 1974 and an Early Learning Unit was added in 1990. The construction of a new complex for secondary and boarding students was completed in 1991. Stanborough school is set in over 40 acres (16 ha) of parkland, located 30 minutes from London.

== Facilities ==
The boarding school occupies a section of the main school building. All the bedrooms have en-suite facilities with either a shower and toilet. The shared bedrooms are of varying sizes and can accommodate two or three boarders. The boarders are separated by gender with the boys on the first floor and the girls on the second floor.

Boarders have access to all communal facilities. The communal area in the first floor has computers for the boarders to use, logging in with their school account. For those with their own laptop wireless internet is available; main school network is accessible throughout the provided computers. Boarders can communicate with their family and friends via e-mail, Skype or social media. Boarders share the main school cafeteria for their main meals. Under the school policy the main meals are strictly vegetarian. However, in the recreational lounge is a mini kitchen where boarders can prepare their own meals and snacks. Not all the boarders are vegetarian.

The school grounds are over 40 acres (16 ha) and they are utilised by the students in sporting and relaxation activities. The boarders have access to the school gymnasium, with supervision.

The local amenities include the Medical Centre and the supermarkets, which are within walking distance.

== Student life ==
There are a wide range of clubs as well as a fine choir and ensemble. Peripatetic teachers offer tuition in a wide range of instruments. Some pupils in years 7 to 9 participate in drama and choir, with performances throughout the year and a major International Arts Festival held in the summer term. All pupils are placed in one of three Houses.

== Academics ==
Currently, Stanborough School has a student body of around 57 pupils. The school has an enrolment representing 40 different nationalities.^{[8]}

Between 2011 and 2016, the average GCSE result was 81%.

Subject Percentages: 2014 – 2015
Percentage	Subjects
100% – 90%	Art, English Language, Business and Communications, Latin, Biology, Geography, History, Greek, Portuguese, French
89% – 80%	English Literature, Chemistry, Spanish, Religious Studies, Maths
79% – 70%	Business Studies, ICT

== Performance Context (2018/19) ==
=== GCSE ===
Independent School average 54.7%

Stanborough Secondary School 63%

Stanborough School is a mixed ability school with a high international enrolment. Stanborough School is a community-focused institution that serves a diverse student body, reflecting the multicultural nature of the local area.

Most pupils move on to university upon completion of Advanced Levels.

== International Stanborough School ==
International Stanborough School makes provision for students for who are learning to speak English as an additional language. It is separately registered with the Department for Education but shares the campus and facilities as the main school. Both are owned by the British Union Conference of Seventh-day Adventists. The main purpose of the international school is to help students develop the necessary fluency and competency in English to transfer to the main school. More than half of the current students come from Hong Kong or Korea and the rest from six other countries. The school shares staffing and all facilities with the main secondary school.

A member of staff meets with parents when representing the international school during visits to Hong Kong.

The associate school closed on 23 August 2019.

== Gallery ==
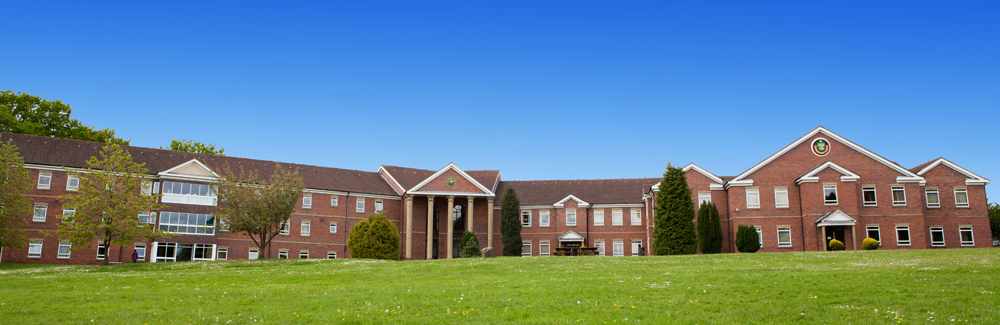
Main building

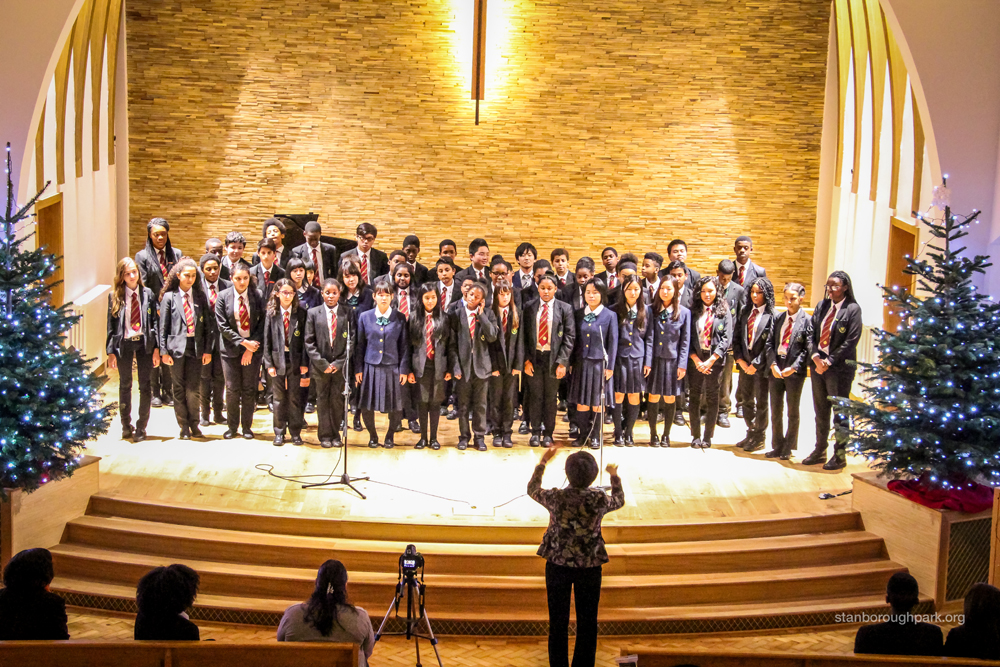
Christmas concert 2015

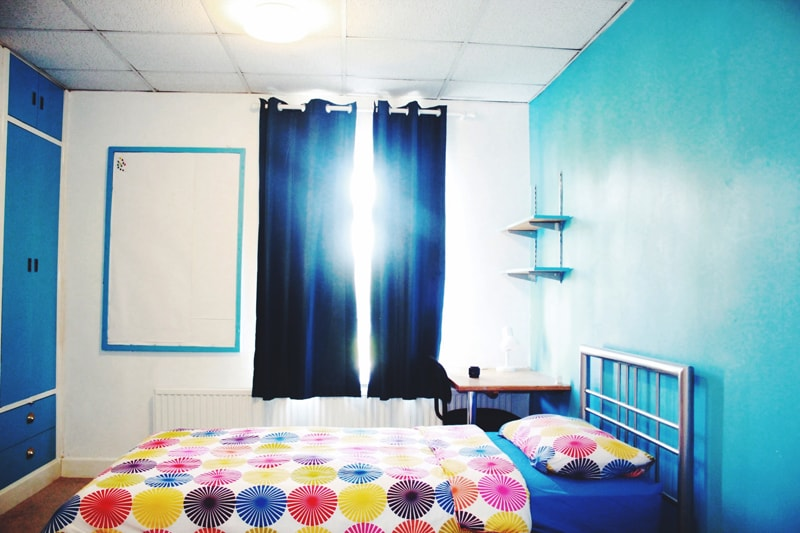
Boarding room

== See also ==
- List of Seventh-day Adventist secondary and elementary schools
- Seventh-day Adventist education
- Seventh-day Adventist Church
- Seventh-day Adventist theology
- History of the Seventh-day Adventist Church
