= Vintage year =

Year in which a fund began investing

Vintage year in the private equity and venture capital industries refers to the year in which a fund began making investments or, more specifically, the date in which capital was deployed to a particular company or project. This metric is useful for benchmarking, identifying trends, estimating the holding period, and controlling returns for the effect of business cycles.

== Origin ==
Most likely, the term vintage year is borrowed from the winemaking industry, where it is also used to divide wines in comparable classes.

== Overview ==
The year of investing is an important and widely used metric to compare performance of the investments financed in the year in question against that of the investments financed in other years or against that of the general market (S&P 500). As the external market conditions change following the overall business cycle, so does performance of investments. Therefore, returns of 50% on investments done in good years are not directly comparable to returns of 10% done in crisis years. That is why a vintage year is taken into account. The returns are comparable if investments share approximately the same timing.
