= Modernizing Opioid Treatment Access Act =

US congressional bill

- Long title: To expand the take-home prescribing of methadone through pharmacies.
- Announced in: the 118th United States Congress
- Number of co-sponsors: 5

Legislative history
- Introduced in the Senate as S. 644 by Ed Markey (D–MA) on March 2, 2023; Committee consideration by United States Senate Committee on Health, Education, Labor, and Pensions

The Modernizing Opioid Treatment Access Act is a proposed United States congressional bill introduced in the 118th United States Congress. Introduced in response to the national opioid epidemic, the legislation would expand access to methadone, an approved medication for treating opioid use disorder (OUD).

The bill would give pharmacies the ability to provide methadone to patients with OUD, which can currently only be accessed at methadone clinics. Additionally, the bill would allow approved healthcare providers to prescribe take-home doses for OUD patients.

== Background ==
Federal law prohibit physicians from directly prescribing methadone for patients with opioid use disorder, and prevent pharmacies from dispensing the medication.

Classified as a schedule II substance, OUD patients are only permitted to access the medication at opioid treatment facilities (OTPs), known as methadone clinics. Patients are generally required to visit clinics in-person to receive daily doses of methadone, and are usually prevented from receiving "take-home" doses.

Critics of these regulations note that while pharmacies are prohibited from dispensing methadone, they are permitted to dispense the same medication for pain. However, opponents of relaxing regulations on methadone treatment for OUD argue that expanding access could lead to misuse of methadone.

Rules were enacted during the COVID-19 pandemic to increase OUD patients' ability to receive take-home doses of methadone. In 2022, the Substance Abuse and Mental Health Services Administration (SAMHSA) proposed to make expanded access permanent.

== Legislative history ==
On March 2, 2023, Senators Ed Markey (D-MA) and Rand Paul (R-KY) introduced the Senate version of the legislation, known as S.644. Accompanying House legislation, known as H.R.1359, was introduced by Representatives Don Bacon (R-NE) and Donald Norcross (D-NJ). As of July 25, 2023, the legislation has 24 co-sponsors in the House. Representative David Trone, a Democrat from Maryland, has endorsed the legislation, arguing that current laws hinder patients' ability to receive medication.

== Support and opposition ==
The legislation is supported by the American Society of Addiction Medicine (ASAM), which represents addiction medicine professionals. The legislation has received opposition from the American Association for the Treatment of Opioid Dependence (AAOTD), a trade group that represents the interests of methadone clinics.
