= Rhodes Wood Hospital =

Eating disorder hospital in Hertfordshire, England

Coordinates: 51.7191°N 0.1733°W

Rhodes Wood Hospital is a specialist hospital for children and young people with eating disorders. It is based in the grade II listed former Mymwood School in Shepherds Way, Brookmans Park, in England.

Rhodes Wood Hospital was acquired by Elysium Healthcare in 2016 and enjoyed a Care Quality Commission rating of Good at their first CQC inspection in 2017. At the CQC inspection in April 2019 the hospital was judged Inadequate and enforcement action was initiated as the hospital was deemed to have not been providing safe care and treatment to patients. According to the CQC report, the hospital comprises three wards: Shepherd, Cheshunt and Mymwood Place with 15, 15 and 12 beds respectively. Elysium Healthcare Ltd agreed with NHS England to stop further admissions onto Mymwood place. The space previously used for Mymwood was subsequently, in late 2020, converted for use as a new ward called Rainbow for treatment of adolescent patients with more acute needs.

On the site of Rhodes Wood Hospital is Rhodes Wood Hospital School, an educational establishment that caters for patients in the hospital and takes no outside pupils. The school was awarded a Good at their last Ofsted inspection.
