= Robert Barclay Academy =

Location
- Cock Lane; Hoddesdon, Hertfordshire, EN11 8JY; England
- Coordinates: 51°45′16″N 0°01′05″W

Information
- Type: Academy
- Local authority: Hertfordshire
- Trust: Scholars' Education Trust
- Department for Education URN: 143131 Tables
- Ofsted: Reports
- Headteacher: Ced de le Croix
- Gender: Co-educational
- Age: 11 to 18
- Enrolment: 610
- Website: Official website

Robert Barclay Academy (formerly Sheredes School) is a co-educational secondary school and sixth form located in Hoddesdon in the English county of Hertfordshire.

Previously a community school administered by Hertfordshire County Council, in September 2016 Sheredes School converted to academy status and was renamed Robert Barclay Academy. The school is now sponsored by the Scholars' Education Trust.

Robert Barclay Academy offers GCSEs as programmes of study for pupils, while students in the sixth form have the option to study from a range of A Levels and BTECs.
