= Kelshall =

Village in Hertfordshire, England

Coordinates: 52.010°N 0.064°W

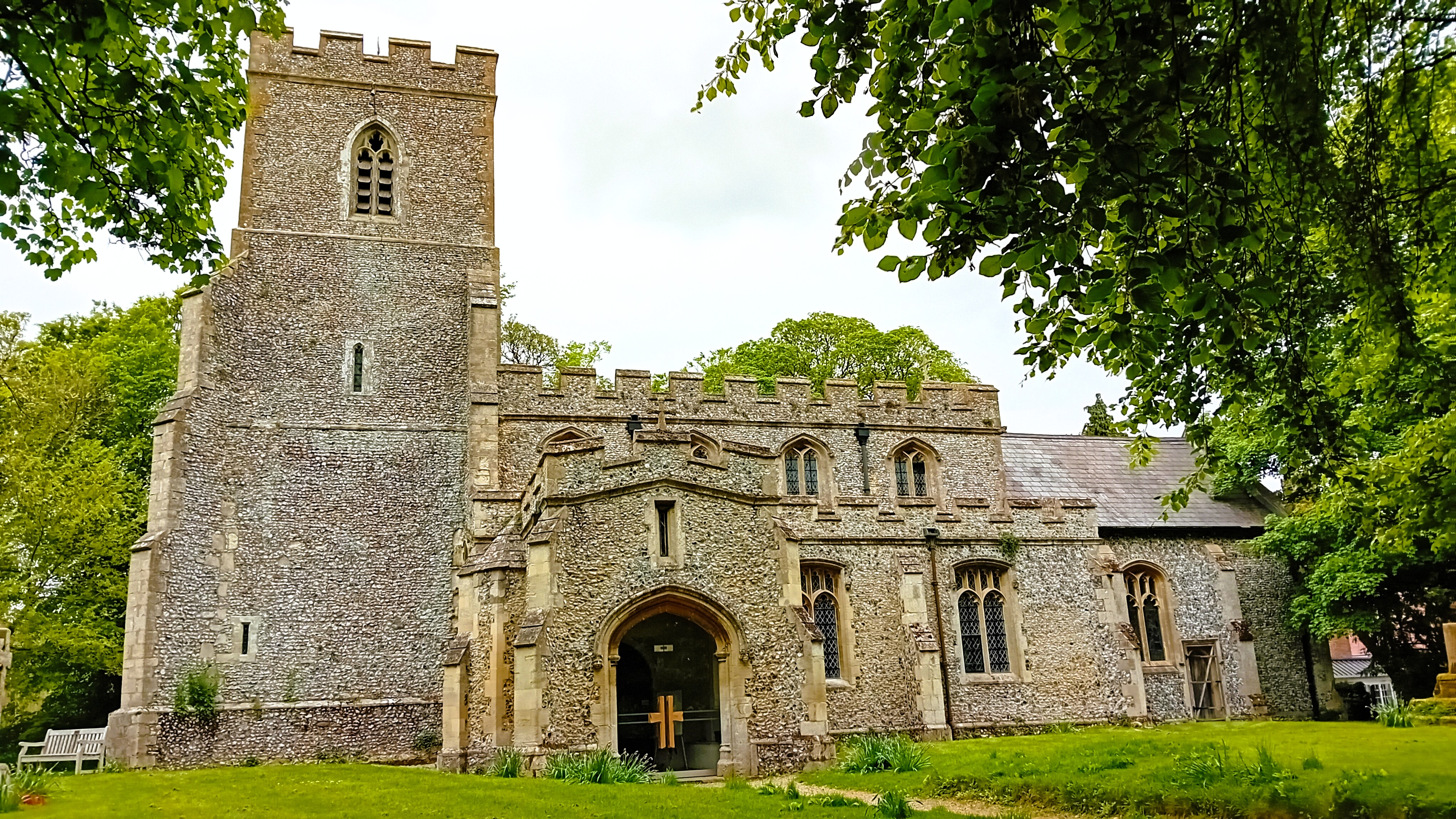
- St Faith's Church

- Location within Hertfordshire
- Population: 166 (Parish, 2021)
- OS grid reference: TL 32925 36376
- Civil parish: Kelshall
- District: Hertfordshire
- Shire county: Hertfordshire
- Region: East
- Country: England
- Sovereign state: United Kingdom
- Post town: ROYSTON
- Postcode district: SG8
- Dialling code: 01763
- Police: Hertfordshire
- Fire: Hertfordshire
- Ambulance: East of England

Kelshall is a small village and civil parish in the North Hertfordshire district of Hertfordshire, England. It lies 3 miles (5 km) south-west of Royston, its post town. The parish had a population of 166 at the 2021 census.

== Geography ==
The village lies on top of a broad chalk ridge of high ground. It has a village hall which was originally built in 1895 as the village school. The parish church of St Faith's is on the edge of the village. The parish also includes surrounding rural areas, particularly to the north-west where the parish extends down the hills to the ancient Icknield Way, now the A505 road, which at this point forms the county boundary with Cambridgeshire.

== History ==
A tumulus or bowl barrow stands on Gallows Hill, near the Icknield Way on the northern boundary of the parish, indicating prehistoric occupation in the area. The tumulus has not been excavated or dated.

Evidence for Roman occupation has been found in the area. Following the discovery of a Roman copper-alloy jug by a metal detectorist in 2014, a subsequent archaeological dig found a Roman grave, which contained a number of other artefacts believed to date to between 205 and 215AD, including a silver denarius of Trajan, three 2nd century copper-alloy coins, a quantity of Roman glass, including bottles, glasses and two polychrome dishes thought to have been made in Alexandria. In 2017, the treasure registrar for the Portable Antiquities Scheme judged the dishes to be amongst the five most significant finds of recent years. The artefacts were subsequently bought by the North Hertfordshire Museum.

The manor of Kelshall was apparently given to the abbey at Ely in the year 1000. The abbey subsequently became Ely Cathedral. The manor remained in the cathedral's ownership until 1600, when Kelshall was transferred to the crown. It was shortly afterwards sold into private ownership. The Domesday Book of 1086 records 28 households at Kelshall.

No priest or church was mentioned at Kelshall in the Domesday Book, suggesting it may not have been a parish at that time. Kelshall's parish church of St Faith's was built in the early 15th century. In the 1880s the church was described as being "ancient, plain, and good, with a tower; and contains a few brasses and monuments". The church was thoroughly restored in 1868–1870, with subsequent restorations in 1911 and 1982.

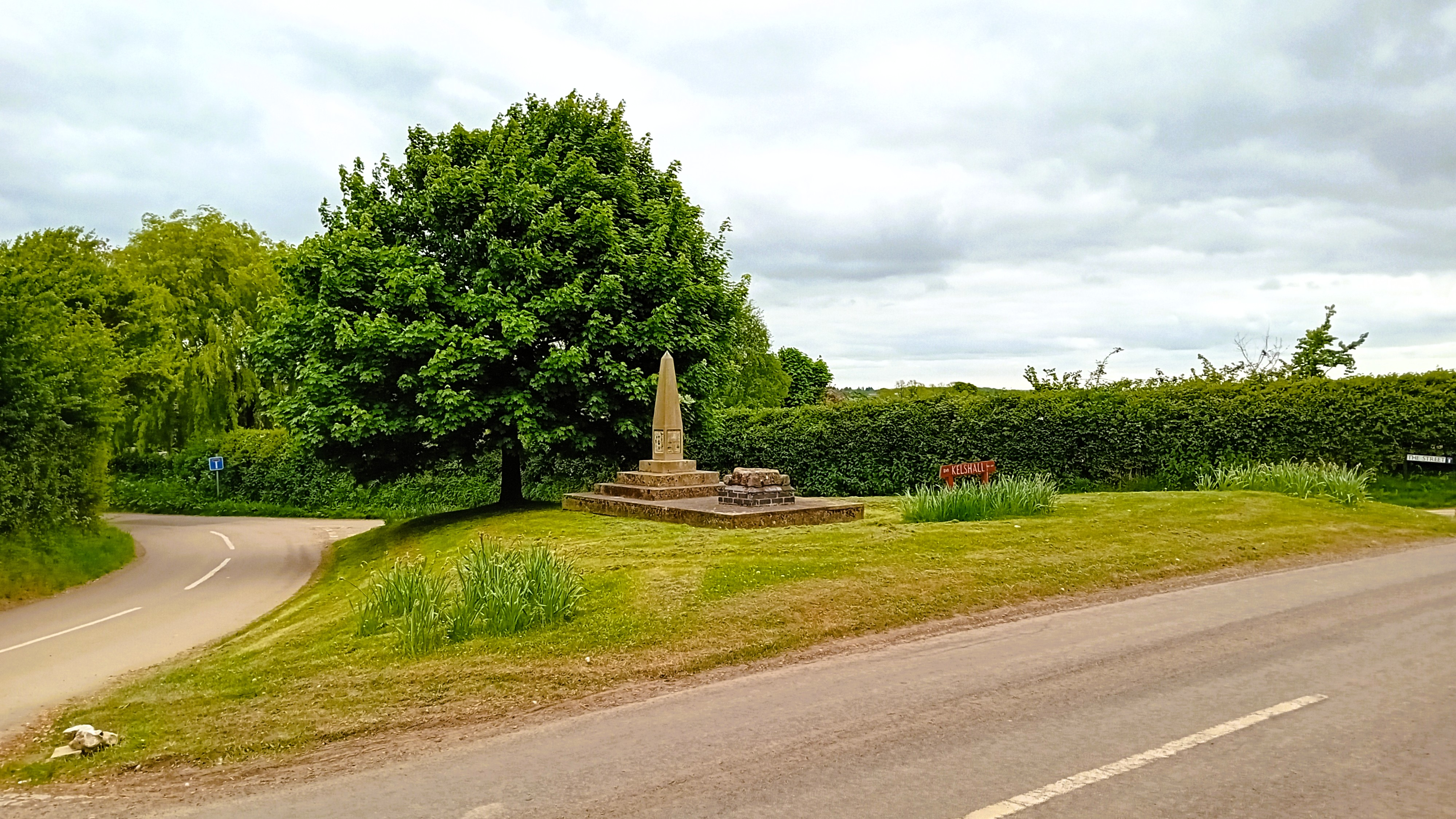
Village green with Millennium Cross

Whilst Kelshall lies some way south of the main road of the Icknield Way to the north, the "top road" routes along the ridge were also of some local importance in the Middle Ages. Kelshall's village green lies at the junction of the top road from Sandon to Therfield and Royston with another road (The Street) which formerly continued to Buckland on the Ermine Street. A cross is known to have existed for several centuries at the junction by the village green. Its origins and original purpose are obscure, and by the early 20th century only the base stone remained. To mark the Millennium celebrations in 2000, the base of the cross was restored and a new obelisk erected alongside it, known as the Millennium Cross.

== Governance ==
There are two elected tiers of local government covering Kelshall, at district and county level: North Hertfordshire District Council and Hertfordshire County Council. Due to its low population, Kelshall has a parish meeting comprising all residents instead of an elected parish council.

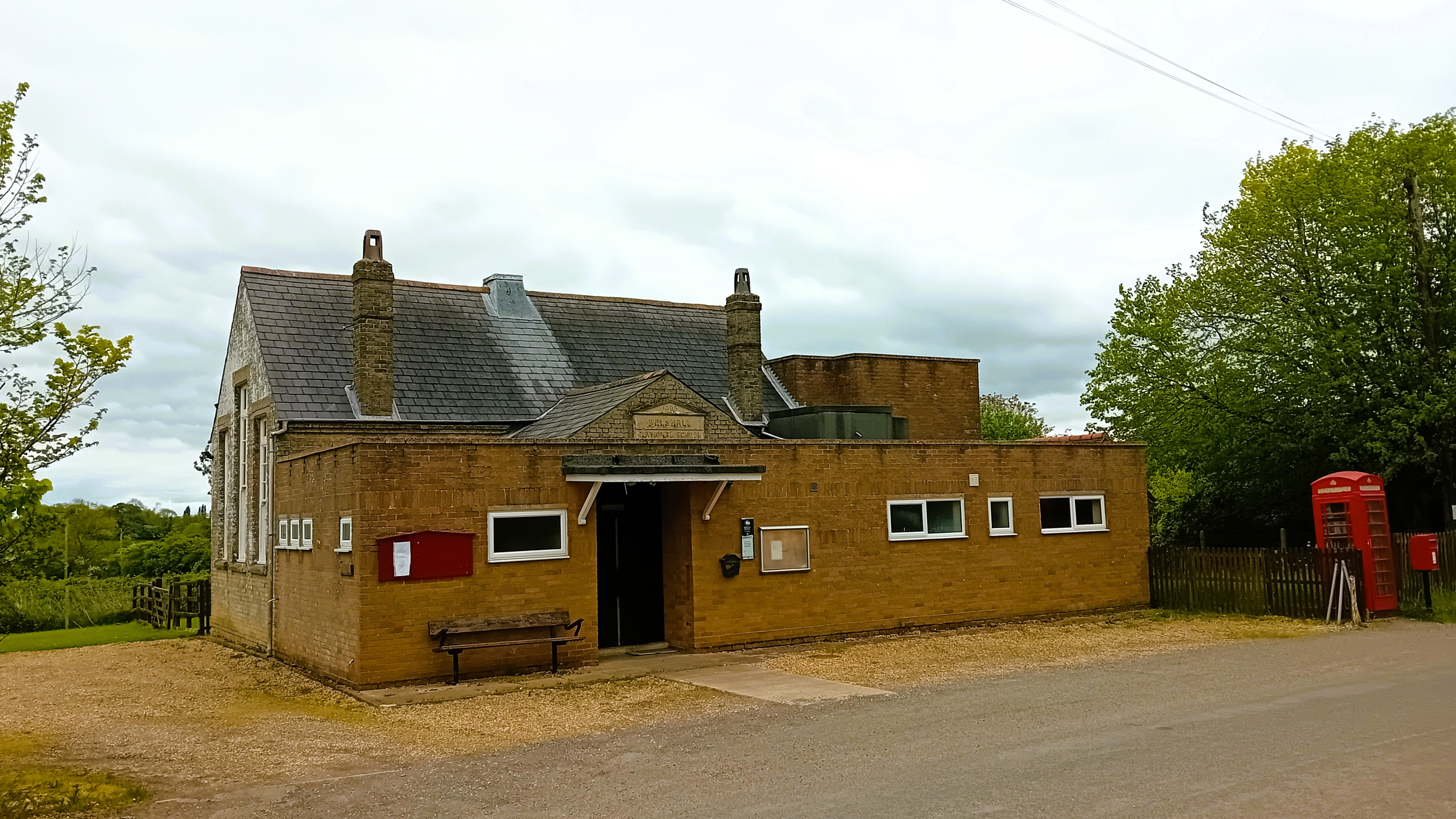
Kelshall Village Hall

The parish of Kelshall was historically part of the hundred of Odsey. Kelshall was included in the Royston Poor Law Union from 1835. The Local Government Act 1894 created parish and district councils. The part of the Royston Poor Law Union within Hertfordshire became Ashwell Rural District; despite the name, the rural district council was always based in Royston. Kelshall's population was too low to be given a parish council, and so it was given a parish meeting instead. Ashwell Rural District was abolished in 1935, becoming part of Hitchin Rural District, which in turn was abolished in 1974, becoming part of North Hertfordshire.

== Population ==
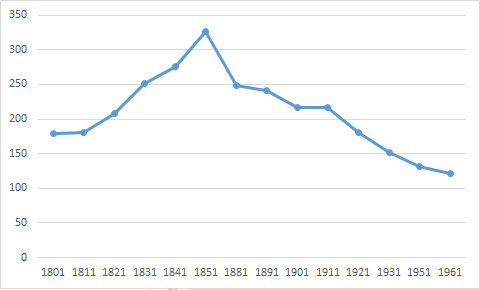
Total population of Kelshall civil parish, 1801–1961, as reported by the Census of Population

At the 2021 census, the population of the parish was 166. The population had been 163 in 2011.

The censuses taken between 1801 and 1961 show the population generally increased from 179 in 1801 to a peak of 326 in 1851. The population gradually decreased after 1851, reaching a low point of 122 in 1961.

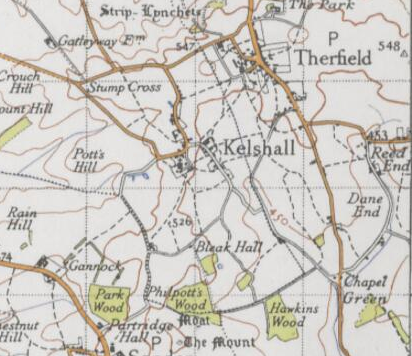
1946 Ordnance Survey map of Kelshall
