= Charles Parkin =

English clergyman and antiquarian

Charles Parkin (1690–1765) was an English clergyman and antiquarian. He was rector of Oxburgh in Norfolk, and assisted Francis Blomefield on his history of the county, completing it after Blomefield's death.

== Life ==
The son of William Parkin of London, a prosperous shoemaker, he was born on 11 January 1690, and educated at Merchant Taylors' School. In 1708 he went to Pembroke Hall, Cambridge, graduating B.A. 1712 and M.A. 1717. He married Mary, the widow of John Meriton the rector of Oxburgh, Norfolk, in 1717. She died in 1732. they had no children.

== Blomefield's History of Norfolk ==
He assisted Francis Blomefield with his History of Norfolk, writing the descriptions of Oxburgh and the adjoining parishes. When Blomefield died in 1752, having written about half of the third volume, Parkin undertook the completion of the unfinished History, the fourth and fifth volumes of which (in the original five-volume folio edition, completed in 1775) were published under his name. According to Craven Ord, however, the last sheets were finished by a bookseller's hack, employed by Whittingham of Lynn. Parkin's Topography of Freebridge Hundred and Half in Norfolk, containing the History and Antiquities of the Borough of King's Lynn, and of the Towns, Villages, and Religious Buildings in that Hundred and Half (London, 1762) was reprinted from the fourth volume.

== William Stukeley and the Royston Cave ==
In the 1740s Parkin engaged in a vituperative dispute with William Stukeley over the antiquity and imagery of the carvings on the walls of the recently discovered cave at Royston. He attacked Stukeley's claim that the chamber had been the private oratory of one "Lady Roisia" in a pamphlet entitled An Answer to, or Remarks upon, Dr. Stukeley's "Origines Roystonianæ" (London, 1744). When Stukeley published a reply, Parkin responded with A Reply to the Peevish, Weak, and Malevolent Objections brought by Dr. Stukeley in his Origines Roystonianæ, No.2 (Norwich, 1748). Joseph Beldam, a later historian of the cave, wrote that "though both parties showed abundant learning and ingenuity, the cause of truth suffered much from their mutual loss of temper.

== Death and bequests ==
Parkin died on 27 August 1765, and by his will (dated 17 June 1759) bequeathed money to his old college for the foundation of exhibitions to be held by scholars from the Merchant Taylors' School and from the free school at Bowes, Yorkshire, which had been founded by his uncle, William Hutchinson of Clement's Inn.
