= Thomas Peyton =

Thomas Peyton may refer to:

- Thomas Peyton (died 1484) (1418–1484), twice Sheriff of Cambridgeshire and Huntingdonshire
- Sir Thomas Peyton, 2nd Baronet (1613–1684), MP for Kent and Sandwich
- Thomas Peyton (Newfoundland politician) (1828–1912), fisherman, civil servant and politician in Newfoundland
- Thomas Peyton (poet) (1595–1626), English poet
