= Daniel Bryan (disambiguation) =

Daniel Bryan may refer to:

- Bryan Danielson (born 1981), American professional wrestler who formerly used the ring name "Daniel Bryan"
- Dan Bryan (1900–1985), Irish soldier
- Daniel Bryan (Big Brother) (born 1973/4), contestant on the British reality television show Big Brother
- Daniel Bryan (Virginia politician) (1789–1866), American politician
- Daniel Bryan Harvey, American musician
- Danny Bryant (born 1980), English musician
