= Rational (Heatley-Gresham) =

British car built between 1901 and 1906

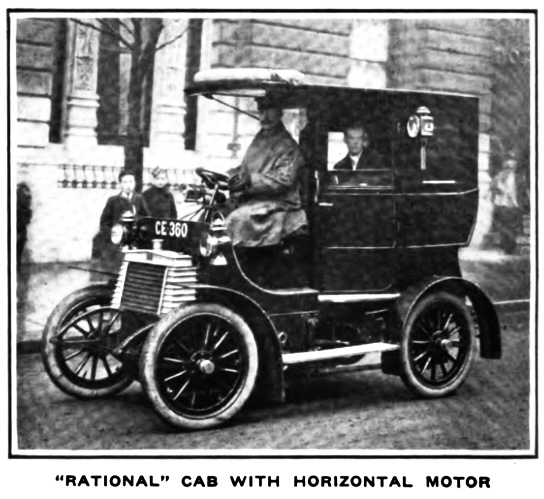
Rational Taxi (1907)

The Rational was a British car built between 1901 and 1906 in Royston, Hertfordshire. It was an 10 hp light car, with a 2281 cc, two-cylinder engine, it had a 2-speed gearbox and chain-drive built by Heatley-Gresham Engineering Co. Ltd.. Fifteen Rational Taxis already in use in London in 1907.

== Technical data ==
- 110 mm (4.3 in) x 120 mm (4.7 in) bore and stroke
- 10 HP at 900 Revolution per minute
- two Speed gearbox
- Top Speed in First Gear 6 Miles an Hour
- Top Speed in Second Gear 18 Miles an Hour
