= Flint Cross =

Hamlet in Cambridgeshire, England

Coordinates: 52.067°N 0.054°E

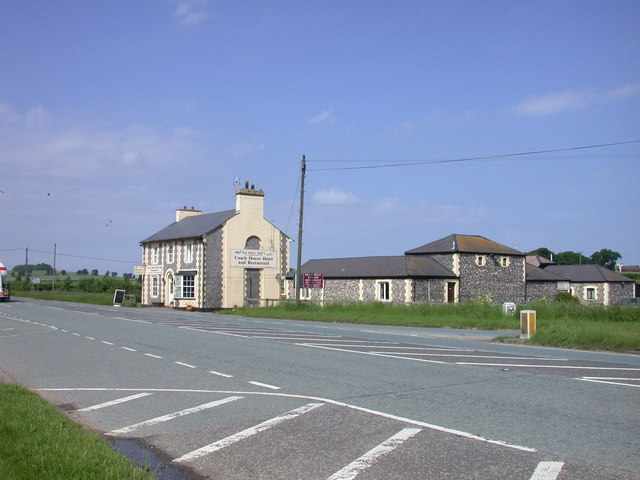
- Flint Cross, looking West towards the Coach House Hotel

- Location within Cambridgeshire
- Civil parish: Melbourn; Great and Little Chishill
- District: South Cambridgeshire
- Shire county: Cambridgeshire
- Region: East
- Country: England
- Sovereign state: United Kingdom
- Police: Cambridgeshire
- Fire: Cambridgeshire
- Ambulance: East of England

Flint Cross is a hamlet and crossroads in South Cambridgeshire, in the English county of Cambridgeshire. It is in the south of the district, where the east–west A505 road meets the B1368 road, which leads north to Fowlmere and south to Barley, Hertfordshire. In both main definitions of parish, in England, it is in Melbourn.

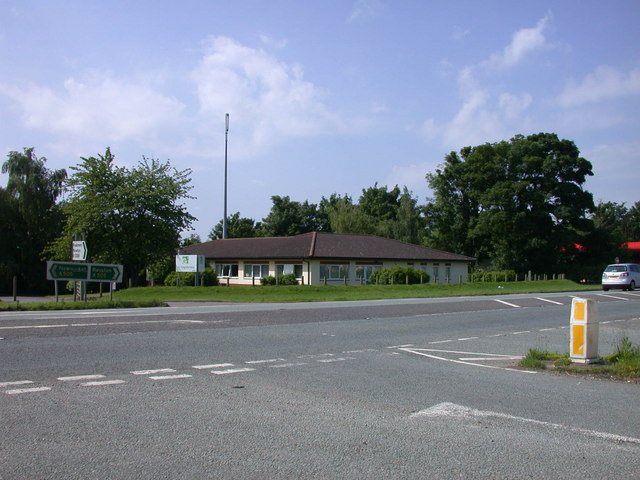
Business premises with antenna mast

== Position ==
Nearby notable settlements are the town of Royston and the villages of Fowlmere and Duxford.

== Landmarks ==
The milestone at Flint Cross, installed in 1731, is Grade II listed. It has a benchmark inscribed on the side, currently at 39.9693 metres (131.133 ft) above mean sea level and stated by Ordnance Survey maps to be 132.3 feet above Ordnance Datum. It is one of a series of waymarked milestones from Cambridge to Barkway, which were installed through a bequest from William Mowse, a lawyer who was Master of Trinity Hall, Cambridge in 1552, whose coat of arms each bear.

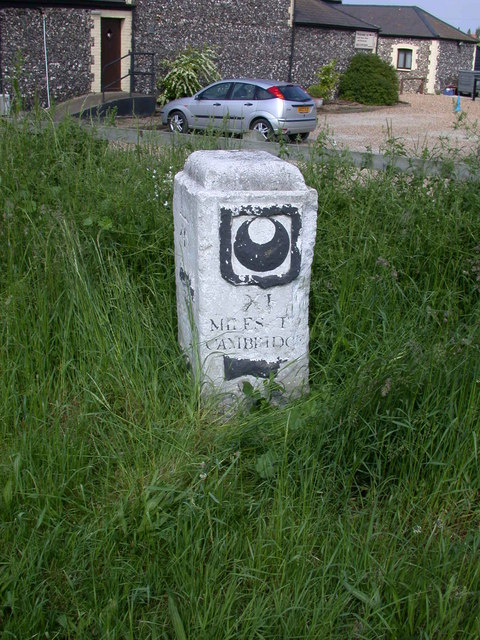
Milestone at Flint Cross, stating XI MILES TO CAMBRIDGE

Buildings include the Coach House hotel. and a petrol station. The hamlet is also the site of Bridgefoot Quarry and Grange Farm, which was damaged by a fire in June 2009. The Anglo-Saxon earthwork of Bran Ditch is to the east but has been mostly ploughed out.

The A505 here saw a series of traffic accidents. A road safety scheme was implemented in October 2010 following a local campaign; however, a proposed reduction in the road's speed limit to 50 mph was not initially included. The speed limit was imposed following a consultation.

== Civil parishes ==
The place is in the south of the civil parish of Melbourn, save for Bridgefoot Farm and houses west in Great and Little Chishill.

== Ecclesiastical parishes ==
The same, main, part is in Church of England parish of Melbourn that has identical boundaries; however the south part is in a six-church-cluster parish: Icknield Way Villages. Melbourn shares its cleric with Meldreth (see Shingay Deanery) and is in the Diocese of Ely. The other part is in the Diocese of Chelmsford. In the Catholic church the relevant churches are in the Deanery of Cambridge, being between Cambourne and Sawston churches, which have a joint parish regular newsletter.
