= Knights Templar in England =

Chivalric Order

The history of the Knights Templar in England began when the French nobleman Hugues de Payens, founder and grand master of the order, visited the country in 1128 to raise men and money for the Crusades.

== History ==
King Henry II (1154–1189) granted the Templars land across England, including some territory near Castle Baynard on the River Fleet, where they built a round church, patterned after the Knights Templar headquarters on Temple Mount in Jerusalem. The Templar estate at Cressing Temple in Essex was one of the very earliest and largest Templar estates in England.

The order was also given the advowson of St Clement Danes.

In 1184, the Templars' headquarters was transferred to the New Temple (Temple Church) in London where once again they built a round church, this one patterned after the Church of the Holy Sepulchre in Jerusalem. It was consecrated in 1185, and became the location for initiation rituals.

In 1185, a hospital was founded at Newark-on-Trent and granted to the Knights Templar.

An inventory by Geoffrey Fitz Stephen reveals that by 1185, the Knights Templar had extensive holdings in London, Hertfordshire, Essex, Kent, Warwickshire, Worcestershire, Salop, Oxfordshire, Cornwall, Lincolnshire and Yorkshire. The involvement of Templars in financial matters is highlighted by Walter of Coventry's story of Gilbert de Ogrestan, the Knight Templar accused of embezzling taxes collected in the Saladin tithe of 1188. He was severely punished by his contemporary Master.

In 1200, Pope Innocent III issued a papal bull declaring the immunity of persons and goods within the houses of the Knights Templar from local laws. This ensured that the New Temple became a royal treasury as well as the repository for the order's accumulated revenues. These financial resources provided the basis for the development of the Templar's local banking facilities.

King Richard I (1189–1199) confirmed the Templars' land holdings and granted them immunity from all pleas, suits danegeld and from murdrum and latrocinium.

King John (1199–1216) had substantial financial dealings with the Knights Templar. At the time of Runnymede, not only was Aymeric de St Maur present, but King John was also resident at the Temple when the Barons first presented their demands. He awarded them the island of Lundy as well as land at Huntspill, Cameley, Harewood, Radnage and Northampton.

King Henry III (1207–1272) also had substantial dealing with Templars, the king's Wardrobe being located there in 1225. He entrusted Templar knights with military, financial and diplomatic commissions, and even considered being buried in the Temple. He did in fact establish a chantry there in 1231.

The first Templar House in England was in London. Early patrons included Robert de Ferrers, 2nd Earl of Derby, Bernard de Balliol, King Stephen of England and Queen Matilda.

== Persecution and dissolution ==
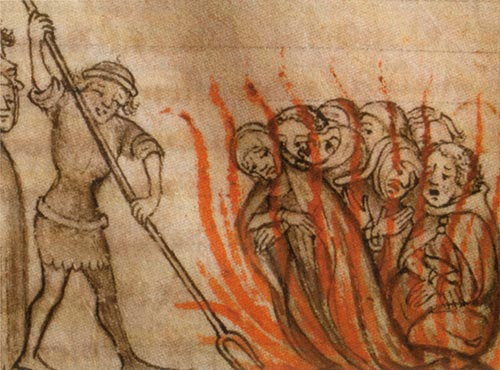
Templars being burned at the stake

King Edward I (1239–1307) had accorded the Knights Templar a slighter role in public affairs, financial issues often being handled by Italian merchants and diplomacy by mendicant orders. Indeed, Edward I raided the treasury in 1283.

When Philip IV, King of France suppressed the order in 1307, King Edward II of England at first refused to believe the accusations. But after the intercession of Pope Clement V, King Edward ordered the seizure of members of the order in England on 8 January 1308. Only handfuls of Templars were duly arrested, however. Their trial ran from 22 October 1309 until 18 March 1310 in front of Deodatus, Abbot of Lagny and Sicard de Vaur. Most of the Templars acknowledged their belief that the order's master could give absolution was heretical, and were then reconciled with the church. However, Willian de la More refused to do so and remained a prisoner in the Tower of London until his death.

In 1312, under further pressure from King Philip IV of France, Pope Clement V officially disbanded the order at the Council of Vienne. In 1314, the remaining Templar leaders in France were executed, some by being burned at the stake. Clement issued a papal bull which granted the lands of the Templars to the Knights Hospitaller, but this was ignored until 1324. Starting in 1347, the priests started letting (renting) part of the Temple to lawyers, from which the evolution of the Inner Temple and Middle Temple as Inns of Court derives.

== Templar Survival in England ==
Most Templars in England were never arrested, and the persecution of their leaders was brief. The order was dissolved due to damaged reputation, but given the pope and church's judgement of the order as free from guilt, all members in England were free to find themselves a new place in society. Templar lands and assets were given to the Order of the Hospital of Saint John, a sister military order—though the English crown held onto some assets until 1338. The largest portion of former Templars joined the Hospitallers, while other remaining members joined the Cistercian order, or lived on pension as lay members of society. The loss of the Holy Land as a base for war against the Muslims had removed the primary reason for Templar existence, and the dissolved order now faded into history, in England as well as the rest of Europe.

== The Templars in Hertfordshire ==
Baldock in Hertfordshire was established by the Knights Templar and between 1199 and 1254 it was their English headquarters. The Hertford Mercury newspaper reported a warren of Templar tunnels beneath the town of Hertford, centering on Hertford Castle, where in 1309 four Templars from Temple Dinsley near Hitchin were imprisoned after their arrest by Edward II, who believed that they were holding a lost treasure.

=== Royston Cave in Hertfordshire ===
St Catherine & Christ carved in Royston Cave by 'fugitive Templars'

Modern tradition has it that after the persecution began the Templars were forced to meet in caves, tunnels and cellars in Hertfordshire and elsewhere in southeast England. However, the brief and modest persecution in England is unlikely to have necessitated this, as remaining members could, even around 1310, met at the house or room of a friend not under arrest—which would have been most Templars.

But after lying undiscovered for at least 300 years, workmen accidentally stumbled upon Royston Cave (August 1742), hidden under a heavy millstone and a covering of soil. Carvings depict, among other images, knights, Saint George and Saint Catherine of Alexandria. Before the brief persecution, the Templars, assuming the cave was theirs, had no reason to hide below the ground, and they had wealth and access to stonemasons if they required religious carvings. It is thus suggested by storytellers and a few historians that Royston Cave is evidence 'fugitive' Templars continued to meet and worship in secret after the disbandment.

There have been some highly questionable claims made about Royston Cave and its history, including the suggestion that its Templar builders may, in effect, have been early Freemasons. However, no evidence of this link has been produced at this time.

== The Templars in Rochester ==
Much of Strood, Kent was a royal manor until Henry II gave it to the Knights Templar around 1159. The Templars had assembled a range of buildings in Strood by 1185, which included a timber hall, barns, kitchens and stables. The stone building, which has survived to the present day, was added around 1240. It consists of a vaulted undercroft supporting a large, undivided first-floor hall, approached by an external staircase. This was probably a part of the range of facilities designed for the temporary accommodation of travelling Templar dignitaries.

Over the years, this hall was altered and enlarged as it passed through the hands of a number of owners. Many additions have been lost but two fine, 17th century brick extensions can still be seen today. These and the massive internal chimney were built by the Blake family, perhaps the richest in Strood at that time.

The estate was inevitably sold off bit by bit until the City of Rochester acquired what was left and decided to use the site for industrial development. The debate over the future of the house was interrupted by a gentleman named Mr. Willis (a local councillor) in 1913 just 2 weeks after purchasing an 8.4 acre (3.4 hectare) plot of land directly East across the River Medway for a facility of what was to become known as the Seaplane Works. It was not until 1951 that work began to save the building and preserve it in the condition in which it can be seen today.

== Templar legacy ==
Nearly any site in England which uses the name "Temple," can probably be traced to Templar origins.

The Temple Church still stands on the site of the old Preceptory in London, and effigies of Crusading Templars can still be seen there today. The land was later rented to lawyers who use it today as Inner Temple and Middle Temple.

== Modern Templar organisations in England ==
Several modern organisations claim links with the medieval Templars. Some, such as the Sovereign Military Order of the Temple of Jerusalem (SMOTJ), also known as the "Ordo Supremus Militaris Templi Hierosolymitani" (OSMTH), have attained United Nations NGO (Non-Governmental Organisation) status. The SMOTJ admits that their group was founded in 1804, "based on the traditions" of the medieval order, which legacy they use to promote humanitarian causes. However, there is often public confusion about the gap in time between the 14th century dismantling of the medieval Templars, and the 19th century rise of more contemporary organisations.

According to a 2004 article in The Times, one modern group in Hertfordshire (not affiliated to OSMTH) claims that although the medieval order officially ceased to exist in the early 14th century, that the majority of the organisation survived underground. There is, however, no verifiable evidence to support this claim. The Times article states that the group has written to the Vatican, asking for an official apology for the medieval persecution of the Templars. In Rome in 2004, a Vatican spokesman said that the demand for an apology would be given "serious consideration". However, Vatican insiders said that Pope John Paul II, 84 at the time, was under pressure from conservative cardinals to "stop saying sorry" for the errors of the past, after a series of papal apologies for the Crusades, the Inquisition, Christian anti-Semitism and the persecution of scientists and "heretics" such as Galileo.

== Templar locations in England ==
=== Churches ===
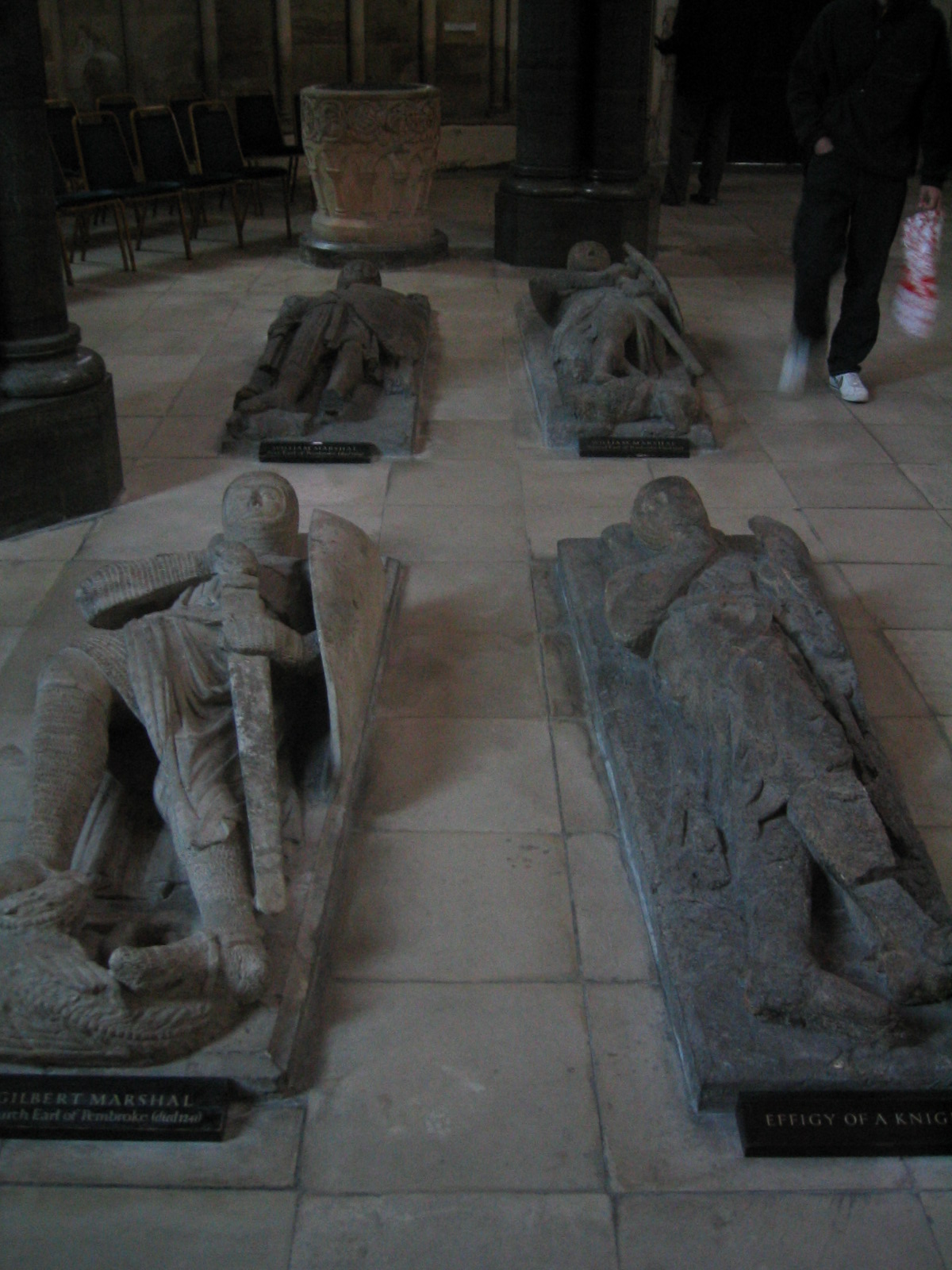
Marble effigies of medieval knights in the Temple Church.

- Bisham Abbey, Berkshire
- All Saints Church, Claverley, Shropshire
- Temple Church, Bristol
- Temple Church, London
- The Holy Sepulchre, Cambridge, Cambridgeshire (The Round Church in Cambridge)
- Garway Church, Herefordshire (Templar church with carvings and part of original round church excavated and fully visible)
- Cressing Temple, Essex
- Temple Balsall & Church, Warwickshire
- Temple Church, Cornwall
- Temple Ewell & Church, Kent
- Rothley Temple (Rothley Preceptory), Rothley, Leicestershire
- The Church of St. Mary the Virgin, Baldock, Hertfordshire.
- St Peter & St Paul's Church Broadwell, Oxfordshire
- St Mary's Church, Shipley, West Sussex
- St. Mary's House, Bramber, West Sussex
- St. Mary's church, Sompting, West Sussex
- Poling Church, Poling, West Sussex
- Templar Church, Dover, on the Dover Western Heights, discovered in 1806 during construction of the fortifications there, according to Matthew Paris the site of King John's submission to the papal legate Pandulph in May 1213

=== Place names ===
- Bristol city centre is rich in Templar place names and history such as Bristol Temple Meads railway station, Temple Bridge, Temple Gate, Temple Street
- Temple Bruer, Lincolnshire, village and Templar ruins
- Temple Cloud, Somerset
- Templecombe, near Sherborne
- Temple Cowley, Oxford
- Temple Dinsley, Hertfordshire (now the village of Preston)
- Temple Ewell, Kent
- Temple Hirst, Yorkshire
- Temple Mills, a post-industrial part of Stratford, London, incorporated into the 2012 Summer Olympics
- Temple Newsam, Leeds
- Temple Normanton, Derbyshire
- Temple Sowerby, Cumbria

=== Other locations ===
- Royston Cave, Hertfordshire. It lies beneath the crossroads of the ancient Icknield Way and Ermine Street.
- Baldock, Hertfordshire (a town founded by the Templars)
- South Witham, Lincolnshire. The only full, preserved, knights templar preceptory within the whole of Europe.
- Denny Abbey, Cambridgeshire. Preceptory of the Knights Templars from 1169.

== Masters of the Temple, London ==
- Richard de Hastyngs, 1160
- Richard Mallebeench,
- Geoffrey Fitz Stephen, 1180 to 1185
- William de Newenham,
- Thomas Bérard, 1200
- Aymeric de St. Maur, 1200,1205 and 1228
- Alan Marcell, 1220 and 1228
- Amberaldus, 1229
- Robert Mounford, 1234
- Robert Saunforde, 1231 to 1247
- Rocelin de Fosse, 1250 to 1253
- Amadeus de Morestello, 1254 to 1259
- Humbert de Pairaud, 1267 to 1269
- William de Beaulieu, 1274
- Robert Turvile, 1277 to 1289
- Guy de Foresta, 1290 to 1294
- Jaques de Molay, 1297
- Brian de Jay, 1298
- William de la More, 1298 to 1307
- Philip Gregory,

== Sources ==
- Evelyn Lord, Knights Templar in Britain, Longman, 2004. ISBN 1-4058-0163-8
- Helen Nicholson, The Knights Templar, Sutton Publishing, 2004. ISBN 0-7509-3839-0
- British Academy, London / Periodicals Service Co, Records of the Templars in England in the Twelfth Century: The Inquest of 1185 With Illustrative Charters and Documents: 009 (British Academy, London, Re), Periodicals Service Co, 1991. ISBN 0-8115-1249-5
- Brighton, Simon (2006-06-15). In Search of the Knights Templar: A Guide to the Sites in Britain. London, England: Orion Publishing Group. ISBN 0-297-84433-4. Archived from the original (Hardback) on 2010-03-08.
- The Closed Rolls of Henry II
- George Smart, The Knights Templar: Chronology, Authorhouse, 2005. ISBN 1-4184-9889-0
- Malcolm Barber, The New Knighthood: A History of the Order of the Temple. Cambridge University Press, 1994. ISBN 0-521-42041-5
- Moses W. Redding, The Persecution and Martyrdom of Knights Templars in England, ISBN 1-4253-0009-X
- Sylvia P. Beamon, The Royston Cave: Used by Saints or Sinners?, Cortney Publications, 1992. ISBN 0-904378-40-3
- F. M Page, History of Hertford, Hertford Town Council, 1993. ISBN 0-9522390-0-0
