= Ashwell Rural District =

History of Hertfordshire

Coordinates: 52.048°N 0.028°W

- Rural district
- Population
  - 1901: 3,953
  - 1931: 3,485
- History
  - Created: 28 December 1894
  - Abolished: 31 March 1935
  - Succeeded by: Hitchin Rural District
  - HQ: Royston
- Contained within
  - County Council: Hertfordshire

Ashwell Rural District was a rural district in Hertfordshire, England from 1894 to 1935, covering an area in the north-east of the county.

== Evolution ==
The district had its origins in the Royston Rural Sanitary District. This had been created under the Public Health Acts of 1872 and 1875, giving public health and local government responsibilities for rural areas to the existing boards of guardians of poor law unions. Under the Local Government Act 1894, rural sanitary districts became rural districts from 28 December 1894. Where rural sanitary districts straddled county boundaries, as Royston Rural Sanitary District did, they were to be split into separate rural districts in each county. The Ashwell Rural District was therefore created as the part of the Royston Rural Sanitary District in Hertfordshire.

The town of Royston straddled Hertfordshire and Cambridgeshire. There was a parish of Royston and a larger special drainage district which included Royston parish and parts of four neighbouring parishes. Both the parish and the special drainage district were partly in Hertfordshire and partly in Cambridgeshire. A joint committee of Hertfordshire and Cambridgeshire County Councils held inquiries during 1894 trying to reach agreement as to how best to deal with Royston. No solution that would keep the town together could be found that was acceptable to the two county councils. Therefore, when the Local Government Act came into force at the end of the year, Royston parish was split along the county boundary through the middle of the town into a Royston (Hertfordshire) parish and a Royston (Cambridgeshire) parish, with the Hertfordshire parish being included within the Ashwell Rural District. The special drainage district was likewise split into a North Royston Special Drainage District and a South Royston Special Drainage District, with the latter being administered by the new Ashwell Rural District Council.

The link between the new rural district and the poor law union continued, with all the elected councillors of the rural district council being ex officio members of the Royston Board of Guardians. The Ashwell Rural District Council held its first meeting on 1 January 1895 at the Board Room of the Union Workhouse on Baldock Road in Royston. Joseph Phillips, a Conservative, was elected the first chairman of the council. He was also the chairman of the Royston Board of Guardians.

The question of how the town of Royston should be governed took another couple of years to resolve. Competing proposals were put forward from the two county councils, with both Cambridgeshire and Hertfordshire wanting the whole town. Eventually, the Local Government Board directed that town should all be placed in Hertfordshire, and on 30 September 1896 the parish of Royston (Cambridgeshire) and the parts of the Cambridgeshire parishes of Bassingbourn, Kneesworth, and Melbourn that were within the North Royston Special Drainage District were transferred to Hertfordshire. As a temporary measure, these areas became the parishes of North Royston, South Bassingbourn, South Kneesworth, and South Melbourn, and were all included within the Ashwell Rural District pending such time as Hertfordshire County Council was able to establish an urban district for the town. On 1 October 1897, a year and a day after the county boundary change, an urban district was established for Royston, at which point Royston ceased to be part of the Ashwell Rural District. The new urban district of Royston covered the parishes of Royston, North Royston, South Bassingbourn, South Kneesworth, South Melbourn, and the part of Therfield parish in the South Royston Special Drainage District. Joseph Phillips, the chairman of Ashwell Rural District Council, was a representative for Royston, and so lost his place on the council. He was co-opted back onto the rural district council and continued to serve as chairman of Ashwell Rural District Council until April 1898. In the meantime he was also elected the first chairman of the new Royston Urban District Council, and so for a few months he was chairman of two neighbouring district councils.

== Parishes ==
Ashwell Rural District contained the following civil parishes. After Royston had been removed from the district in 1897, Ashwell Rural District consisted of a number of rural parishes in the area broadly south and west of Royston.

Parish	From	To	Notes
Ashwell	28 Dec 1894	31 Mar 1935	
Barkway	28 Dec 1894	31 Mar 1935	
Barley	28 Dec 1894	31 Mar 1935	
Hinxworth	28 Dec 1894	31 Mar 1935	
Kelshall	28 Dec 1894	31 Mar 1935	
North Royston	30 Sep 1896	30 Sep 1897	Transferred from Melbourn Rural District, Cambridgeshire on 30 September 1896. Abolished to become part of Royston Urban District on 1 October 1897.
Nuthampstead	28 Dec 1894	31 Mar 1935	
Reed	28 Dec 1894	31 Mar 1935	
Royston	28 Dec 1894	30 Sep 1897	Became part of Royston Urban District on 1 October 1897.
South Bassingbourn	30 Sep 1896	30 Sep 1897	Transferred from Melbourn Rural District, Cambridgeshire on 30 September 1896. Abolished to become part of Royston Urban District on 1 October 1897.
South Kneesworth	30 Sep 1896	30 Sep 1897	Transferred from Melbourn Rural District, Cambridgeshire on 30 September 1896. Abolished to become part of Royston Urban District on 1 October 1897.
South Melbourn	30 Sep 1896	30 Sep 1897	Transferred from Melbourn Rural District, Cambridgeshire on 30 September 1896. Abolished to become part of Royston Urban District on 1 October 1897.
Therfield	28 Dec 1894	31 Mar 1935	

== Premises ==
Although named after Ashwell, the district's largest village, the council remained based in the town of Royston, reflecting the district's origins in the Royston Poor Law Union. The council generally met at the board room of the Royston Union Workhouse after meetings of the larger Board of Guardians. Administrative office functions were carried out at the office (and home) of the clerk to the council, Arthur Sharpe, at The Laurels, 13 King Street (called Back Street prior to 1911) in Royston. By the early 1930s the council was also using The Laurels as its meeting place.

== Abolition ==
Under the Local Government Act 1929 the boards of guardians and poor law unions were abolished, and provisions were put in place allowing county councils to review the districts within their areas to form more effective areas for administrative purposes. Hertfordshire County Council had a number of relatively sparsely populated districts in the north and east of the county, including Ashwell Rural District. A number of options were considered for how to rationalise these small districts. At one point a very large rural district was proposed covering all the rural districts in the north-east of the county, to be administered from Bishop's Stortford. Ashwell Rural District Council objected to that proposal and requested instead to be joined with the Hitchin Rural District, on the basis that Hitchin was considerably easier to get to than Bishop's Stortford for them.

Ashwell Rural District was abolished on 1 April 1935, being incorporated into the Hitchin Rural District save for a couple of minor boundary alterations, notably on the edges of Royston.
