= Royston Town Hall =

Municipal building in Royston, Hertfordshire, England

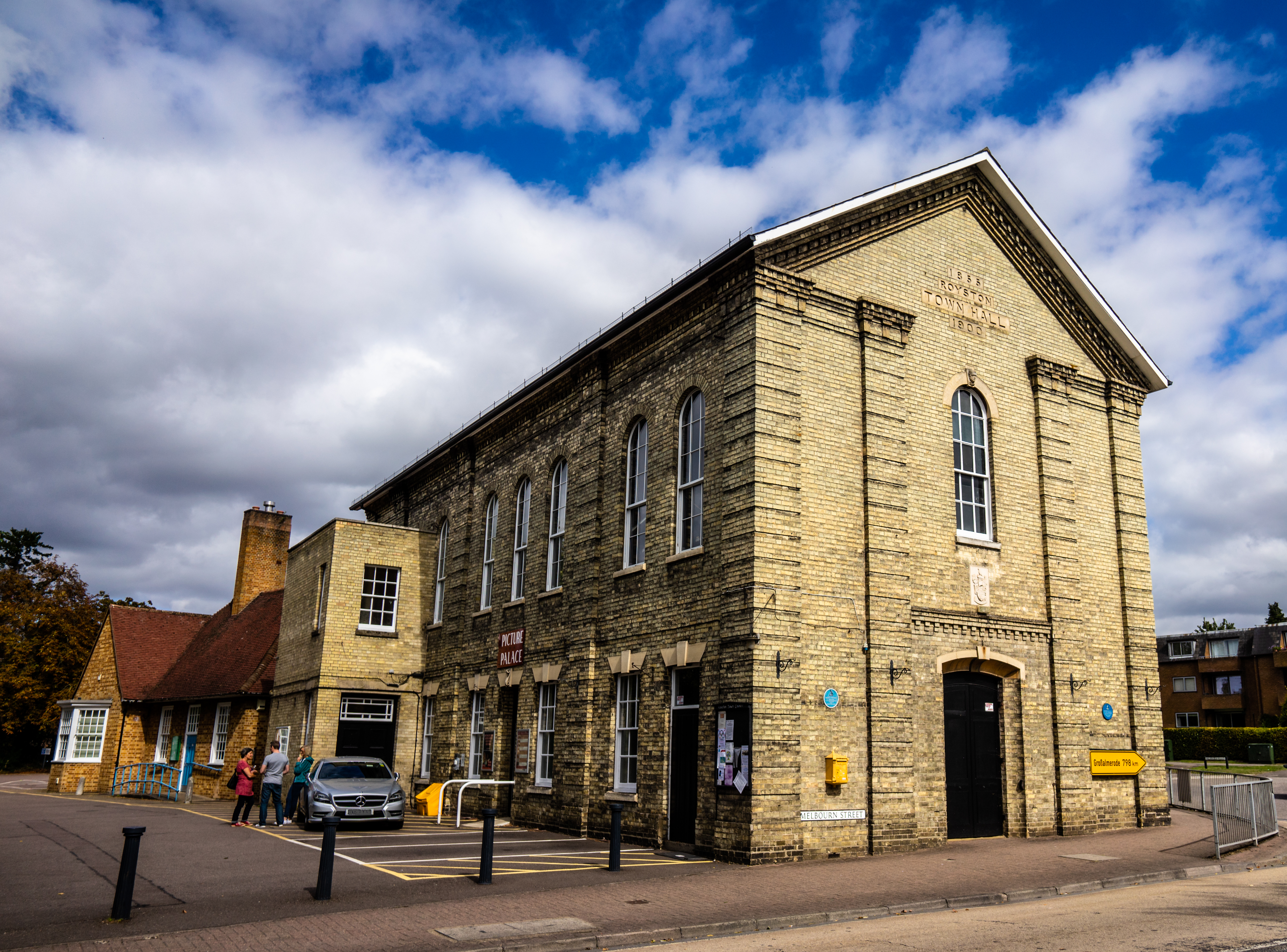
- Royston Town Hall

- Shown in Hertfordshire
- 52.0484°N 0.0202°W
- Location: Melbourn Street, Royston

History
- Built: 1855

Site notes
- Architectural style: Neoclassical style

Royston Town Hall is a municipal building in Melbourn Street, Royston, Hertfordshire, England. The structure, which continues to be used as the meeting place of the local town council, is a locally listed building.

== History ==
The building was commissioned in the mid-19th century with financial support from Charles Yorke, 4th Earl of Hardwicke, whose seat was at Wimpole Hall, as a mechanics' institute for the town. The site he selected, on the north side of Melbourn Street, was occupied by the turnpike tollgate cottage for the road to Cambridge which had been established by the Hauxton and Dunsbridge Turnpike Trust in 1725.

The building was designed in the neoclassical style, built in yellow brick and was completed in 1855. The design involved a rectangular building with a tall main frontage facing onto Melbourn Street. It featured a segmental-headed doorway, with a hood mould and a keystone, on the ground floor and a round headed window, with an ashlar stone surround and a keystone, on the first floor. The keystone above the first-floor window bore a carved head intended to depict Hardwicke's face. The doorway and window were flanked by pairs of full-height pilasters supporting an open modillioned pediment with a date stone in the tympanum. Internally, the principal rooms were the lower hall (later known as the Heritage Hall) and the upper hall (later known as the Hardwicke Hall).

Following the implementation of the Technical Instruction Act 1889, which required local authorities to promote and fund adult education, many mechanics' institutes were acquired by the local authorities to meet the new legal requirements. The newly formed Royston Urban District Council held its first meeting in the building on 1 October 1897, purchased the building for £600 in 1900, and subsequently renamed it Royston Town Hall.

The building was also used for public meetings: in March 1910, the writer, Redcliffe N. Salaman, spoke in the hall during his unsuccessful attempt to secure a seat as a Liberal Party candidate for Hertfordshire County Council. He went on to write the landmark book, The History and Social Influence of the Potato, which established the history of nutrients as a new literary genre.

The building continued to serve as the headquarters of the urban district council for much of the 20th century but ceased to be the local seat of government when North Hertfordshire District Council was formed at Letchworth in 1974. Royston Town Council, which was created as a successor parish council to the former urban district council, established its offices and meeting place in the building.

A major programme of refurbishment works, which involved the creation of a community cinema, to be known as the "Royston Picture Palace", was completed in 2013. After the managers of the cinema, Saffron Screen, handed back the contract in May 2023, there was local concern that the cinema would close. However, the town council subsequently confirmed that films would continue to be shown for the time being.
