= A4146 road =

Road in Buckinghamshire and Bedfordshire

A4146

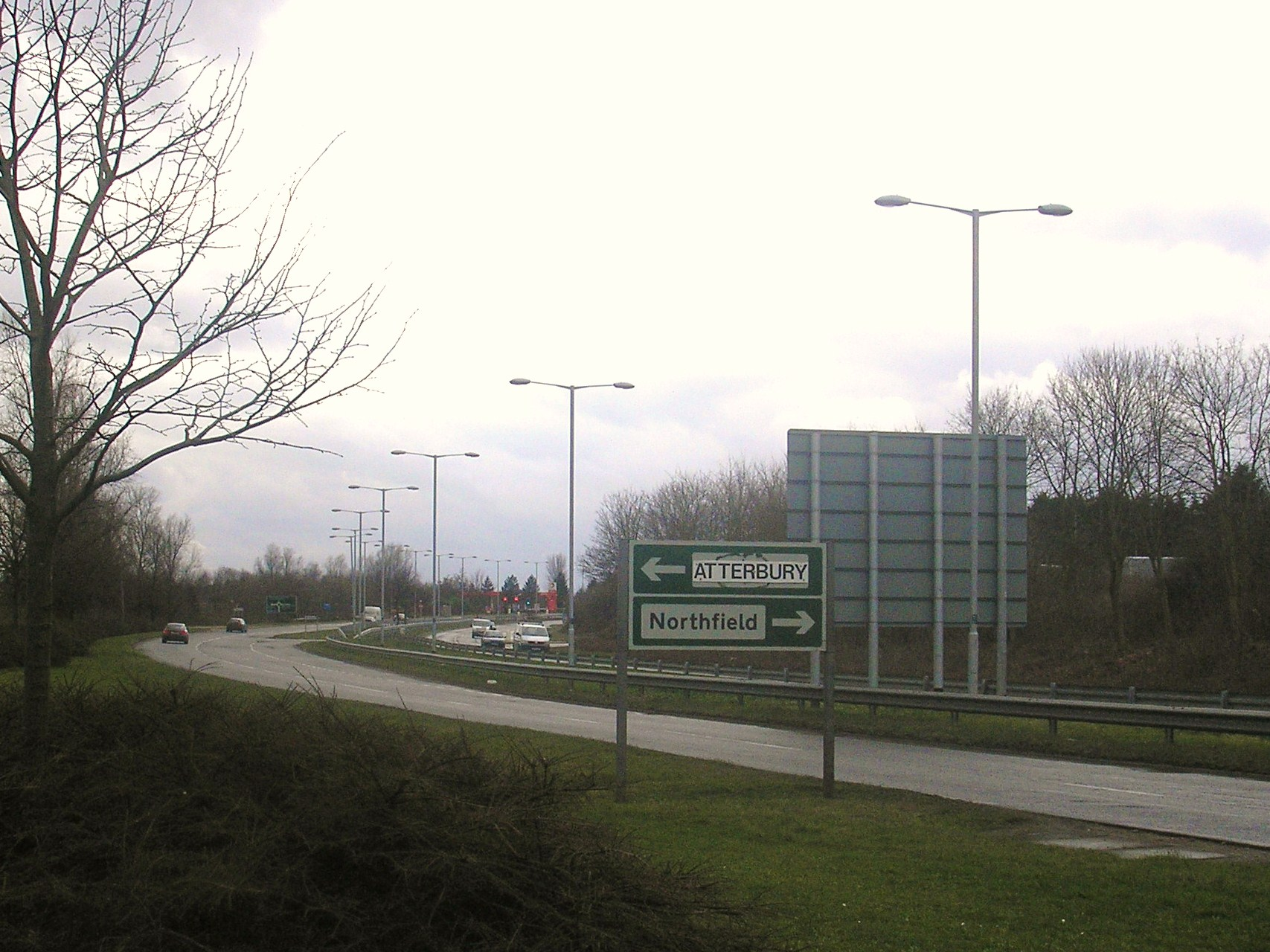
- A4146 in Milton Keynes (as Childs Way)

Major junctions
- From: A505 in Leighton Buzzard
- A505; A4012; A418; A5; A421; A509
- To: A509 in Milton Keynes, near to M1 Junction 14

Location
- Country: United Kingdom
- Constituent country: England

Road network
- Roads in the United Kingdom; Motorways; A and B road zones

The A4146 is an A-class road in England running from (near) M1 junction 14 at Milton Keynes, around Linslade and Leighton Buzzard as far as the A505 to Dunstable.

== Route ==
=== Milton Keynes ===
In Milton Keynes, the road begins at a junction with the A509 near Junction 14 of the M1 Motorway and briefly follows H6 Childs Way westwards before turning south onto the V11 Tongwell Street, west again onto the H10 Bletcham Way and once more to the south where it joins with the A5. It then separates again at the "Kelly's Kitchen" roundabout heading west to bypass the southern flank of Bletchley.

=== Linslade & Stoke Hammond Western Bypass ===
At the end of this single-carriageway bypass, from a point just south of the Water Eaton estate, a new alignment has been built for the road to continue west on a short stretch of dual carriageway bypassing Linslade and Stoke Hammond and to hug the West Coast Main Line for most of the way south towards Leighton Buzzard. The route is planned to tie in with a proposed A418 Wing bypass. The new road features five new roundabouts, four over-bridges and three under-passes. The bypass was the focus on an anti-road protest. During the protest two women chained themselves to a digger. They were arrested and charged, but later acquitted.

=== Leighton Buzzard southern bypass ===
At a roundabout at the start of the A418 just north of Ascott, the A4146 takes over the former route of the A505 road around the south of Leighton Buzzard. This stretch is partly a three-lane single carriageway and partly a wide two-lane single carriageway. On reaching a junction with the unclassified Leighton Road (Leighton Buzzard–Billing), the A4146 designation ends and the route continues eastwards as the A505.
