= Therfield Heath =

Escarpment in Hertfordshire, England

Coordinates: 52.0423°N 0.05491°W

- Site of Special Scientific Interest
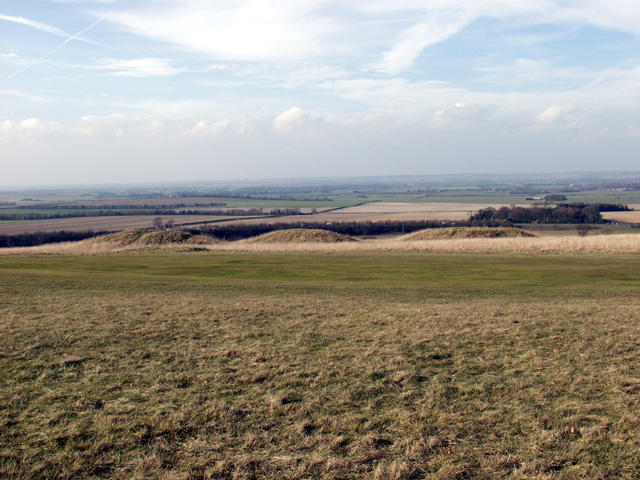
- The open country of the Heath
- Location of Therfield Heath.
- Area of search: Hertfordshire
- Grid reference: TL344400
- Interest: Biological
- Area: 143.3 ha (354 acres)
- Notification date: 1984
- Location map: Magic Map

Therfield Heath is a biological Site of Special Scientific Interest and Local Nature Reserve on the chalk escarpment just north of Therfield, Hertfordshire. Since it lies south-west of the town of Royston, it is also known locally as Royston Heath. The heath is a common on which sheep are still regularly grazed. The site offers views towards the north, over the valley of the Cam as far as Cambridge.

The heath contains a long barrow, thought to be Neolithic, and several Bronze Age round barrows, all of which English Heritage classes as scheduled ancient monuments. The round barrow cemetery is the largest known example of its type in Hertfordshire. The heath was reportedly favoured by King James I as a hunting ground.

The highest point of the heath is Therfield Hill. This top reaches 168 m (551 ft), the highest point for twelve miles in every direction with a relative height of about 72 m. The top is crowned by a water tower. Church Hill has many rare pasqueflowers, which flower in early spring.

The Heath can be accessed from Baldock Road.
