= Weston Hills Tunnel =

- Weston Hills Tunnel taken from north
- Interactive map of Weston Hills Tunnel

Overview
- Location: Baldock, Hertfordshire
- Coordinates: 51.9781°N 0.1763°W
- Route: A505 Baldock Bypass

Operation
- Work began: April 2004
- Opened: March 16, 2006
- Owner: Hertfordshire County Council

Technical
- Length: 230 m (750 ft)

The Weston Hills Tunnel is a twin road tunnel under the Weston Hills near Baldock in Hertfordshire. It was constructed as part of the A505 Baldock bypass.

A public inquiry was held in 1995, and in 2002 the government granted permission to build the road. Construction started in April 2004 and the bypass and tunnels opened on 16 March 2006

The bypass as a whole, including the tunnel, cost £43 million.

The tunnel itself was constructed using a cut and cover method, during which the hill was cut away and the concrete tunnel structure then put in place. The hillside was then re-filled in over the top - see Bypass Construction Gallery.

The purpose of the tunnel at this position is to reduce the gradient of the road, and to preserve the visual line of the hills and provide crossing points for wildlife such as deer. The chalk cuttings for the tunnel have become a haven for butterflies which are native to the area.
