= Roisia's Cross =

Coordinates: 52°02′53.06″N 0°01′26.83″W

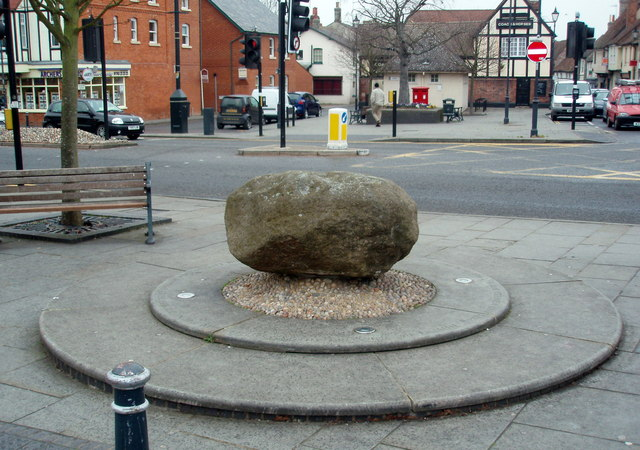
The Royse Stone, the remaining footstone of Roisia's Cross

Roisia's Cross was a medieval cross in Royston, Hertfordshire, England. It was erected at the crossroads of Ermine Street and the Icknield Way (cum Ashwell Street). Only the base of the structure survives.

Most likely it was in the southeast angle of the crossroads in the parish of Barkway. This was in the fee of the Lordship of Newsells. The first recorded owner was Eudo Dapifer, steward to William the Conqueror. Eudo was married to Rohais, daughter of Richard Fitz Gilbert. Whether there was some monument predating this remains a matter for speculation.

== The Royse Stone ==
The footstone, a glacial erratic, still exists. The 18th century antiquarian Reverend William Stukeley described it as:

"A flatish [sic] stone, of very great bulk, with a square hole or mortaise, in the centre, wherein was let the foot of the upright stone or tenon, which was properly the cross."
