= Goffers Knoll =

Knoll in England

Coordinates: 52°03′45″N 00°01′44″E

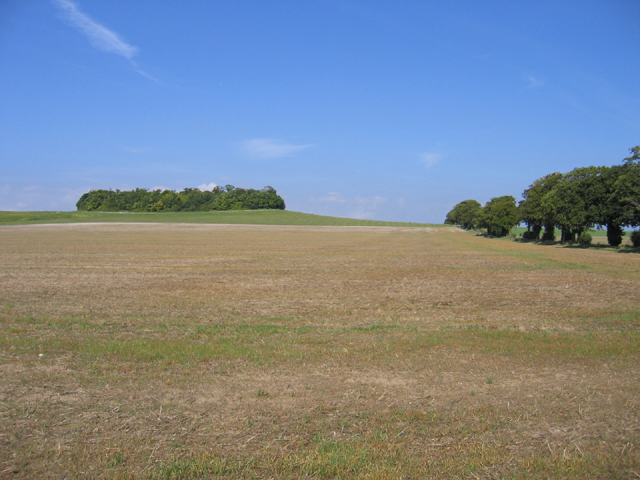
Goffers Knoll seen from the A505 road

Goffers Knoll is a prominent knoll on the Hertfordshire-Cambridgeshire border in the east of England, to the east of the town of Royston and south of Melbourn. It is formed from a spur of the chalk uplands to the west which go on to form the Chiltern Hills. The knoll, standing some 60m above sea level is clearly visible from the A505 road which runs to the south.

Hidden within the copse of trees which surmounts the knoll is a bowl barrow which dates from the Bronze Age and is reported to be substantially intact. It is a scheduled ancient monument. The barrow is 21m in diameter and stands some 1.5m in height above ground level. In the absence of trees, the barrow would be a prominent landmark overlooking the ancient Icknield way (the current route of the A505) and the low-lying land towards Duxford and Cambridge. Excavations of the barrow were carried out by RC Neville in the mid 19th Century and again around 1920.
