= Joseph Beldam =

British historian and abolitionist (1795–1866)

Joseph Beldam (26 December 1795 – 6 June 1866) was an English writer, historian and advocate of the abolition of slavery.

Beldam was born at Shepreth Hall (Cambridgeshire), son of William Beldam and Marianne (née Woodham), and died at Banyers, Royston (Hertfordshire) and is buried in the family vault at Royston Church. He studied at St Peter's College, University of Cambridge, graduating on 9 October 1818, having entered the Middle Temple on 22 January 1818 to study Law. In his initial appointment to the Bar in 1825, he worked the [Norfolk Circuit] but had to retire from it owing to poor health. He then established a practice at the Old Palace Court, Royston. He subsequently resigned his practice so that he could devote his time to the abolitionist movement, with which he first became involved in 1826, joining the Anti-Slavery Society in London in 1827.

It was his publication of an open letter to Lord Dacre in that year that first brought him recognition for his anti-slavery work, when he came to the attention of Zachary Macaulay, the first editor of the Anti-Slavery Reporter and a former manager of a sugar plantation in Jamaica that used slaves. He subsequently became the editor or author of a majority of the Anti-Slavery Society's publications (generally anonymously) and, following the passing of the Emancipation Act in 1833, his legal expertise allowed him to become the official counsel for the society. Beldam's efforts at this period were mostly investigating abuses of the interim measures by which slaves would become apprenticed to their former masters as a means of allowing them to develop as fully independent, free citizens. Thanks to Beldam's careful collection of information, Parliament was forced to end the apprenticeship system in 1838, three years early.

After this final liberation of slaves in the British colonies, Beldam became involved in international efforts to end slavery everywhere. He joined the Society for the Extinction of the Slave Trade and for the Civilisation of Africa, whose president was the Prince Consort, Albert. He edited the proceedings of the Society's first general meeting on 1 June 1840, but the Society was doomed to vanish after the Niger expedition of 1841.

In later life, he turned to antiquarian pursuits, re-investigating the medieval Royston Cave in 1852 with his friend Edmund Nunn (curator of Royston Museum). He was elected a Fellow of the Society of Antiquaries of London on 1 May 1856 for his historical and archaeological researches. It was not until the middle of the twentieth century that his anti-slavery efforts became known, when his papers were presented to the National Library of Jamaica. A modest man, he refused two appointments he was offered by the Colonial Office, made no attempt to enter politics and generally maintained a low profile in the movement.

Joseph did enjoy travel and was acquainted with such people as William Wordsworth and Francis Arundale. There are at least two watercolor paintings which were sketched and painted by both Joseph and Francis.

== Beldam's Publications ==
- Il Pastore Incantato, or, The Enchanted Shepherd; A Drama: Pompeii, and other poems. London: Hurst, Robinson & Co (1824); credited to "A student of the Temple"
- Reflections on Slavery: in Reply to Certain Passages of a Speech Recently Delivered by Mr Canning. Addressed to the Right Hon. Lord Dacre. (1826)
- A Summary of the Laws Peculiarly Affecting Protestant Dissenters. With an Appendix, containing Acts of Parliament, Trust Deeds, and Legal Forms. London: Joseph Butterworth (1827)
- The Permanent Laws of the Emancipated colonies. (1838)
- The Foreign Slave Trade. A Brief Account of its State, and of Treaties Thereto, Continued to the Present Time. London: John Hatchard & Son (1838)
- A Review of the Late Proposed Measure for the Reduction of Duties on Sugar. (1841)
- Recollections of Scenes and Institutions in Italy and the East. 2 volumes. London: Madden & Co. (1851)
- Royston Court House and its Appertances. (1863)
- The Icenhilde Road. Archaeol J 25, 21-45
- On the Origins and Use of the Royston Cave. Royston: John Warren (1884)
