= A505 road =

Road in southern England

A505

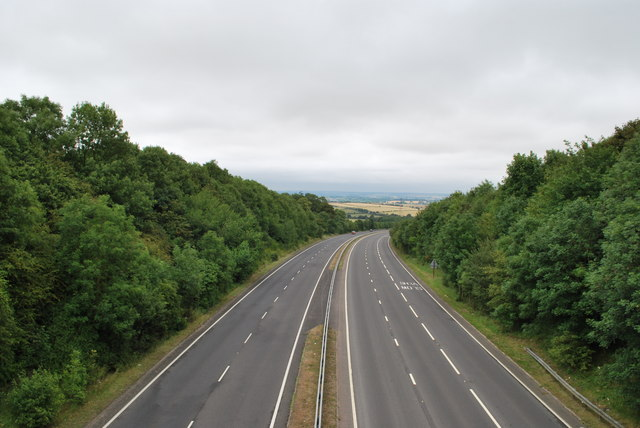
- A505 near Hitchin

Route information
- Length: 49.2 mi (79.2 km)
- History: Construction completed 1990s

Major junctions
- West end: A4146 in Leighton Buzzard
- A4146; A5 A5183 A5505; M1; A6 A1081 A602 A600 A1(M) A1198; A10 M11 A1301; A11
- East end: A11 near Sawston

Location
- Country: United Kingdom
- Constituent country: England
- Counties: Bedfordshire; Hertfordshire; Cambridgeshire
- Primary destinations: Dunstable, Luton, Hitchin, Royston, Cambridge (Via A11 then A1307 or M11 and A10

Road network
- Roads in the United Kingdom; Motorways; A and B road zones

The A505 is a road in the East of England. It follows part of the route of the Icknield Way and the corresponding Icknield Way Path and runs from Leighton Buzzard in Bedfordshire to the A11 Abington Interchange North in Cambridgeshire.

== Route ==
=== Bedfordshire – Leighton Buzzard to Luton ===
The road begins at a roundabout with the A418, the A4146 and the B440 south of Leighton Buzzard as a wide A-Class Primary Route. The road passes through two roundabouts as a single carriageway, and acts as the Leighton Buzzard Bypass. To enter Leighton Buzzard from the A505, an advisable route is to use the A4012 North from the roundabout at Billington. Southbound on the B440 from here will take you towards Hemel Hempstead and Whipsnade Zoo. Continue along the A505 along a 50 MPH stretch with speed cameras to reach the A5 at a roundabout, where the A5 (in the form of a spur) replaces its existing eastbound route to form the Dunstable Northern Bypass to M1 Junction 11a. Going northbound on the motorway will take you to Milton Keynes, Northampton and Birmingham, whilst southbound will take you to Luton, London and St Albans. The A505 continues southbound into Dunstable. There are speed cameras again on this piece of road. An east turn in Dunstable takes you to Luton on the secondary A class road, A505. The A505 will reach the M1 motorway at Junction 11. Prior to this is a roundabout with the road number A5065. Taking the A5065 into Luton is a replacement to the A505 which resumes after Luton as a dual carriageway. The route through Luton is as follows: A5065; A6 South East to the Airport; A505 North, or use the M1 (M1 South; Exit at Junction 10 and travel North on the A1081 and rejoin A505)

=== Hertfordshire – Luton to Hitchin and A1(M) motorway ===
After Luton the road continues North East signposted towards Hitchin. The A505 passes the major London Luton Airport. Passing Luton Airport and continuing north towards a dual carriageway that will lead you out of Luton. The dual carriageway here is a secondary route, but still A-Class. This road has white signposts and is marked red on most atlas maps and OS Landranger maps. This road is the Luton to Hitchin stretch, which leads directly to both. The 2 lane road passes through the English countryside before entering Hitchin. There is a roundabout, which southbound using the A602 takes you to Stevenage. Heading north will keep you on the A505. After passing through a one way system, you will find another roundabout. Heading north takes you onto the A600 heading towards Shefford and Bedford. Heading East will keep you on the A505. This road winds through the eastern suburbs of Hitchin as a single carriageway. The road then enters Letchworth Garden City, though only the outskirts on the south side. Signs are posted in either direction, showing both routes to Hitchin and the A1(M). Heading South at a roundabout in Letchworth will result in arriving at the A1(M). An A road given a motorway standard due to its high speed. The A505 joins this road at Junction 9.

=== Hertfordshire – Baldock to Royston ===
The A505, after the A1(M), becomes a primary route, usually marked green on both atlases and signs. The recent construction of the Baldock bypass has created a dual carriageway from the A1(M) J9 through to Royston. A roundabout allows traffic into Baldock via the B197, as does a junction after the tunnel. The tunnel is a later redevelopment with the Baldock bypass. It travels under one of the Chiltern Hills, under farmland, and is called the Weston Hills Tunnels. This piece of the road is not open to cyclists, farm traffic, motorcyclists under 50cc and has height and width restrictions. The road passes a junction and dips into a large hill on the almost perfectly straight Dual Carriageway. The road follows the railway track. After another roundabout is the Royston Bypass. Here, the road passes through the Greenwich Meridian. The first roundabout is the terminus point of the A1198, a Royston to Huntingdon road which is in a perfect straight line, and serves part of the London – Lincoln Roman Road, Ermine Street. This road was also previously numbered the A14. Ermine Street now joins the A1(M) and the A607 where it enters Lincoln. Unfortunately, the road is not all joined up, and there is very little trace south of Royston. The site of this Roundabout, or near Royston, may have been a junction for Ermine Street and Icknield Way. The previous dual carriageway may also be part of the ancient Icknield Way. If you were to continue along the A505 towards Cambridge, you would still be using the Icknield Way. The road may not just be Roman, with many fossils found along this path. After the Junction with the A1198, is a large cutting to form the A505, then is a roundabout with the A10, with northbound going to Cambridge via the popular Shepreth Wildlife Park and Trumpington Park and Ride. Southbound on the A10 will take you into Royston towards London. The A505 continues northbound, leaves Hertfordshire and enters Cambridgeshire.

=== Cambridgeshire – Royston to A11 ===
The road continues as single carriageway roughly north-easterly, following the ancient Icknield Way past Goffers knoll and passing through the hamlet of Flint Cross and over the Anglo-Saxon earthwork Bran Ditch. It enters the village of Duxford and passes the Imperial War Museum Duxford. The road crosses the M11 at Junction 10 – southbound leading to Bishop's Stortford, Stansted Airport, Harlow and London, but is just signposted for London and Airport. Northbound is signposted to The Midlands with Cambridge and A14. It also leads to Huntingdon and the A10. Icknield Way bears off north to join the A11 whilst the A505 continues forward to Whittlesford, then another roundabout with a service station (BP) and the A1301, northbound to Sawston, The Shelfords and Cambridge, the southbound route goes to Saffron Walden and the Historic Chesterfords where the Icknield Way once ran. Saffron Walden would be signposted from the M11 previously, as there is a restricted Junction at M11 Junction 9. The A505 serves as an access route to the A11 to those from the North, though another alternative would be to use the A14 if coming from the north, to access routes to Thetford and Newmarket. After the Sawston junction, the road continues forward and joins the A11 Northbound ONLY. The left lane is to access Cambridge, Haverhill and Linton on the A1307, and the right lane for A11 routes to Norwich and Thetford and A14 routes EAST to Newmarket, Bury St Edmunds, Ipswich and Felixstowe. After the A1307 to the Six Mile Bottom Junction is part of the Icknield Way continued from the Chesterfords and the A505 before.

== Bypasses ==
For part of its route between Leighton Buzzard and Dunstable (the "Leighton Buzzard bypass"), the road uses the former route of the Leighton Buzzard to Luton railway, as far as Dunstable. It also shares its route with the A5 near Dunstable and the A1081 near Luton Airport (grid reference TL 110 206). The section between Letchworth and Royston follows the Icknield Way, with the deviations of modern bypasses at Baldock and Royston. The £43 million Baldock bypass includes the Weston Hills Tunnel.

== Earlier routes ==
Originally the route started in Dunstable and ended in Luton. The rest of the route was originally designated the A601 to the A11, but was extended west to Wing Hill, near Linslade, when the Leighton Buzzard bypass was built. However, the western Leighton Buzzard bypass has since been built and designated the A4146. As a result, the section from Billington Road to Wing Hill has also been designated the A4146.
