= Thomas Kefford =

Famous English Clockmaker

Thomas Kefford (baptised 18 March 1686, in Royston) (fl. 1710–1750), was a noted English clockmaker doing business at The Dial, Fore Street, Royston, Hertfordshire. Thomas was the son of Thomas Kefford (also a clockmaker) and Mary Fordham, and was one of 4 siblings baptised at Royston.

Upon Kefford's death (or retirement) in about 1750, he was succeeded by Samuel Coxhall, who came from Shepreth, Cambridgeshire and had been apprenticed in June 1746, for 8 years and a fee of £21.
