= Danny Bryant =

English musician (born 1980)

- Born: 26 July 1980 (age 46); Royston, Hertfordshire, England
- Genres: Blues, blues rock
- Occupations: Musician, Singer-Songwriter
- Instruments: Vocals, guitar
- Years active: 1999–present
- Label: Jazzhaus Records
- Website: dannybryant.com

Danny Bryant (born 26 July 1980) is an English blues guitarist and singer-songwriter. He was born and grew up in Royston, Hertfordshire, England. At the age of 14, he began playing the guitar and became a professional guitar player at the age of 18. Since then he has toured all over the world and appeared on bills alongside a number of notable artists such as Buddy Guy, Carlos Santana, Joe Cocker and Mick Taylor.

== Life and career ==
=== RedEyeBand ===
He formed Danny Bryant's RedEyeBand together with his father, Ken Bryant, on bass guitar. They toured and recorded together with drummer Trevor Barr Superstar until Ken's retirement in July 2013. Bryant signed with the German-based label, Jazzhaus Records, in 2011 and went on the record his first live DVD/CD on 17 September 2011, titled Night Life – Live in Holland. 2013 seen Bryant release his first studio album for Jazzhaus Records titled 'Hurricane'. As of 2013 the title 'Redeyeband' was dropped, and the band are now billed as 'Danny Bryant'.

=== Danny Bryant ===
The release of Hurricane, highlighted Danny's singer-songwriter abilities.

2014's Temperature Rising was preceded by a five-week tour of the US and Canada fronting Walter Trout's band while Trout recovered from liver transplant surgery. The Temperature Rising tour then took the band across the UK & Europe and as far afield as China.

== Discography ==
- Watching You! (2002; re-released 2009)
- Shadows Passed (2003)
- Covering Their Tracks (2004)
- Days Like This (2005)
- Live (2007) Continental Blue Heaven CBHCD 2010
- Black and White (2008) Continental Blue Heaven CBHCD 2014
- Just As I Am (2010) Continental Blue Heaven CBHCD 2016
- Night Life: Live In Holland (2012) Jazzhaus Records JHR 050
- Hurricane (2013) Jazzhaus Records JHR 067
- Temperature Rising (2014) Jazzhaus Records JHR 095
- Blood Money (2016) Jazzhaus Records JHR 120
- Big Live in Europe (2017)
- Revelation (2018)
- Means of Escape (2019)
- The Rage To Survive (2021)
- Rise (2023)
- Nothing Left Behind (2026)
