= Therfield =

Village in Hertfordshire, England

Coordinates: 52.0163°N 0.0575°W

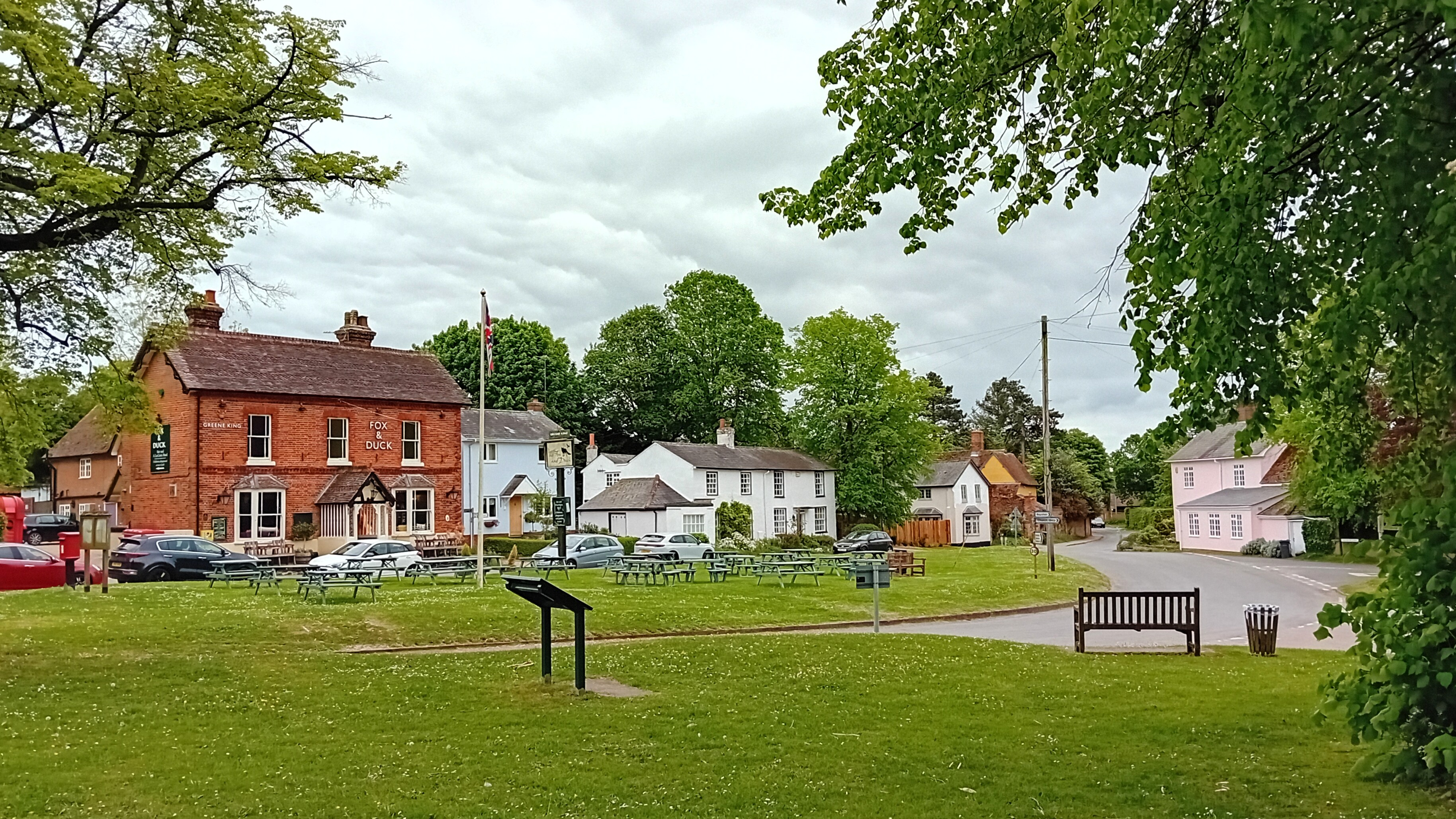
- Village green by the Fox and Duck

- Location within Hertfordshire
- Population: 588 (Parish, 2021)
- OS grid reference: TL334371
- District: North Hertfordshire
- Shire county: Hertfordshire
- Region: East
- Country: England
- Sovereign state: United Kingdom
- Post town: ROYSTON
- Postcode district: SG8
- Dialling code: 01763
- Police: Hertfordshire
- Fire: Hertfordshire
- Ambulance: East of England
- UK Parliament: North East Hertfordshire

Therfield is a village and civil parish in the North Hertfordshire district of Hertfordshire, England. The village stands on a broad chalk ridge, about 2 miles (3 km) south-west of Royston. At its northern end, the parish includes the common land of Therfield Heath, which adjoins the edge of Royston.

== Toponymy ==
There are several possible origins for the name Therfield. It may derive from "þyrre field", meaning "dry open land" in Old English. Alternatively, the "Ther" element may have derived from "furrow" or could be a theophoric reference to Thor.

== History ==
There is evidence of prehistoric occupation in the area, particularly along the Icknield Way which forms the northern boundary of the parish. Five bowl barrows dating to the Bronze Age (c. 2000–700 BC) are clustered together on Therfield Heath.

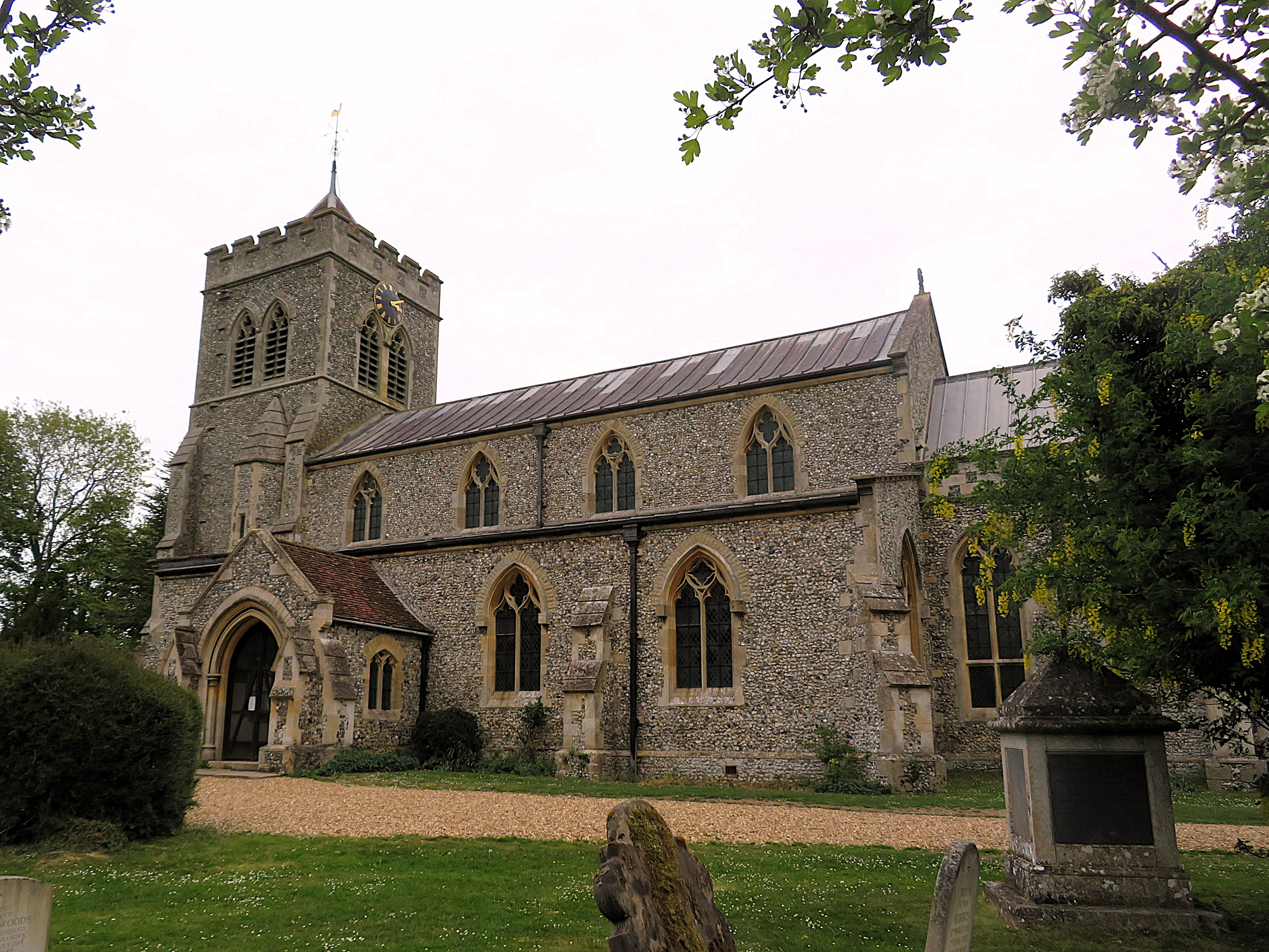
St Mary's Church

The Domesday Book of 1086 records 52 households at Therfield, including a priest, suggesting that Therfield was a parish by then. Therfield at that time was owned by Ramsey Abbey, 30 miles (48 km) to the north. The manor of Therfield had been given to Ramsey Abbey in the early 11th century, and remained in its ownership until the dissolution of the abbey in 1539. The manor was then claimed by the crown, which subsequently granted it to St Paul's Cathedral in London.

Although there was a priest recorded at Therfield in the Domesday Book, the first definitive reference to a church at Therfield dates from 1178. The church, which is dedicated to St Mary, was rebuilt in the 14th century and again in 1878, re-using some material from the 14th-century building. A depiction of the Stuart royal arms was retained from the earlier building. Francis Turner (1637–1700), was rector of Therfield from 1664; he went on to be Bishop of Ely, but was buried back at Therfield alongside his wife, Ann.

North-west of the church, a motte and bailey castle known as Tuthill was built in the mid-12th century. It seems likely that the castle was built around 1143–1144 following attacks on the area by Geoffrey de Mandeville, 1st Earl of Essex, during the civil war of the Anarchy (1138 to 1153). The castle was coupled with a defensive enclosure surrounding the pre-existing village to the east of the castle. The castle did not last long, falling into disuse in the early 13th century. Archaeological excavation of the castle site was carried out in 1958, after which the site of the motte continued to be protected, but much of the bailey area was levelled in 1960.

=== Therfield Chapel ===
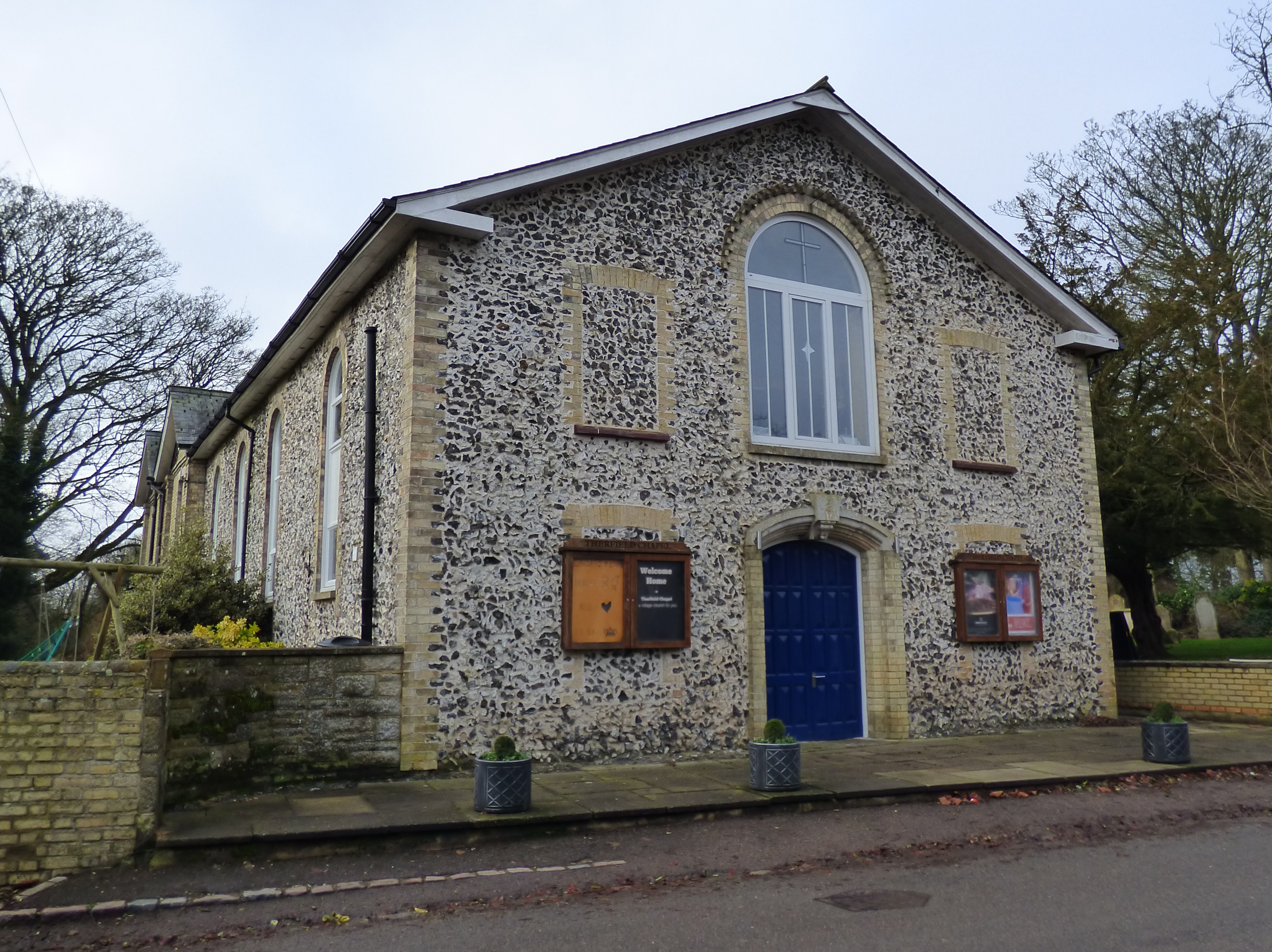
Therfield Chapel

Therfield Chapel was established as a congregation of Protestant dissenters (the "Independents") in 1836. The current chapel building was built in 1854. For a time the chapel was known as Therfield Congregational Church, being affiliated to the Congregational Union. When in 1966 the Congregational Union was replaced by a body which espoused more liberal views, the chapel seceded and became affiliated first to the Fellowship of Independent Evangelical Churches (FIEC), and then to the Evangelical Fellowship of Congregational Churches (EFCC).

== Geography ==
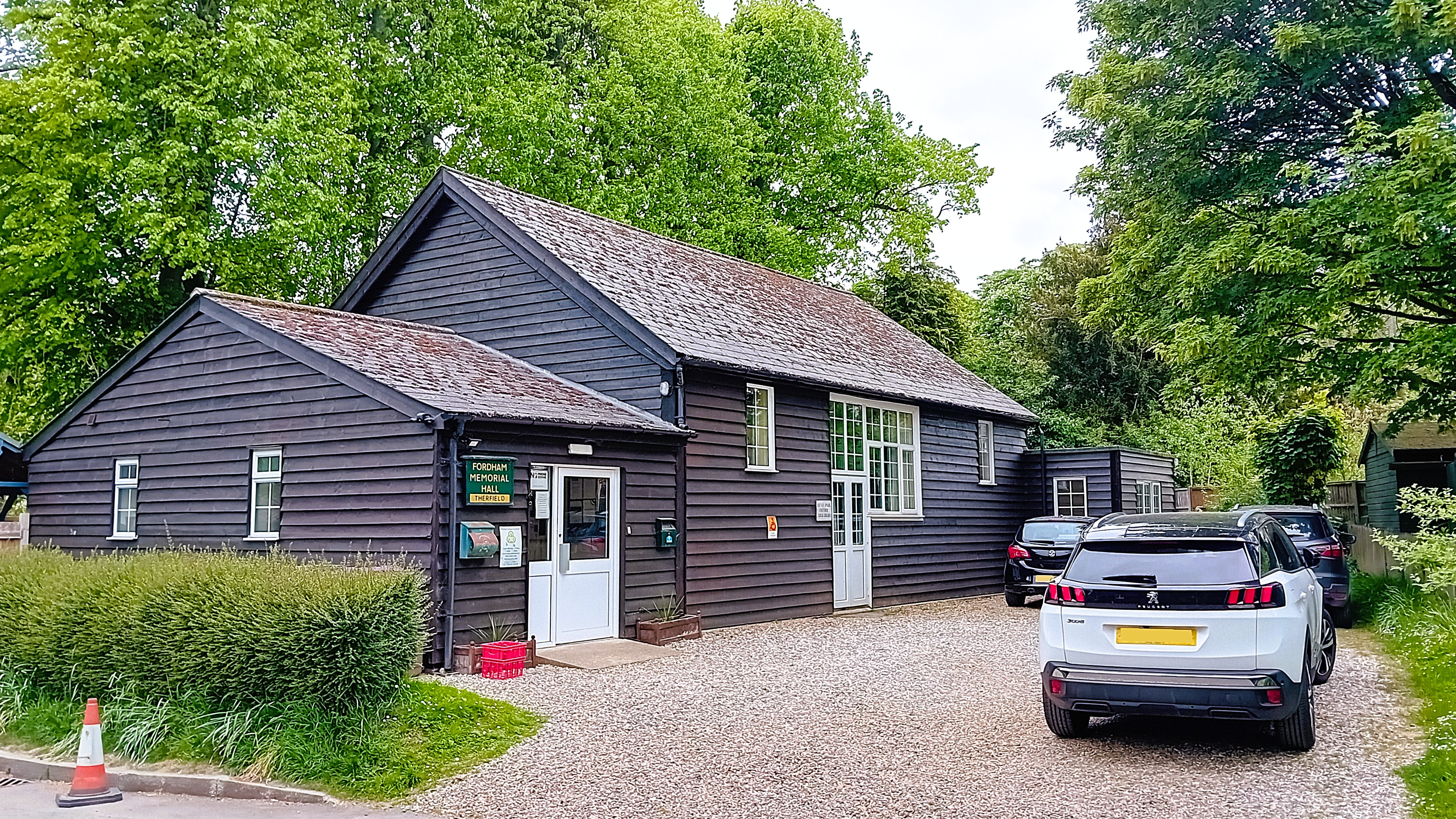
Fordham Memorial Hall

The Nature Reserve of Therfield Heath lies a mile to the north of the village. From here on a clear day it is possible to see Ely Cathedral, over 25 miles (40 km) to the north-east.

The Icknield Way Path passes through the village on its 110-mile journey from Ivinghoe Beacon in Buckinghamshire to Knettishall Heath in Suffolk. There is a village hall called the Fordham Memorial Hall on Church Lane. The village has one public house, the Fox and Duck, which overlooks the village green.

The village also includes the Hay Green area to the south, which has another green. There are a number of farms in the rural parts of the parish, and the hamlet of Reed End is on the eastern boundary of the parish, separated from the neighbouring parish of Reed by the Roman road of Ermine Street (now the A10).

== Governance ==
Therfield has three tiers of local government at parish, district and county level: Therfield Parish Council, North Hertfordshire District Council, and Hertfordshire County Council. The parish council meets at Therfield Chapel.

=== Administrative history ===
The parish of Therfield historically formed part of the hundred of Odsey. The parish included the parts of the town of Royston which lay south of Icknield Way and west of Ermine Street until 1540, when Royston (which had straddled five parishes) was made a separate parish.

Therfield was included in the Royston Poor Law Union from 1835. The Local Government Act 1894 created parish and district councils. The part of the Royston Poor Law Union within Hertfordshire became Ashwell Rural District; despite the name, the rural district council was always based in Royston. Therfield ceded further territory to Royston in 1897 and 1935. Ashwell Rural District was abolished in 1935, becoming part of Hitchin Rural District, which in turn was abolished in 1974, becoming part of North Hertfordshire.

== Population ==
At the 2021 census, the population of the parish was 588. The population had been 556 in 2011.
