= Thomas Peyton (poet) =

English poet (1595 - 1626)

Thomas Peyton (1595–1626) was an English poet.

== Life ==
Peyton was born at Royston, Cambridgeshire, the son of Thomas Peyton. In 1613 he was admitted a student of Lincoln's Inn. He was probably a member of the prominent family of Peyton of Isleham, but his name does not figure in the genealogies.

== Works ==
Peyton produced in London in 1620 the first part of a poem entitled The Glasse of Time in the First Age. The volume opens with addresses in verse to King James, Prince Charles, Francis Bacon, and the Reader. The poem consists of 168 stanzas, of varying lengths, in heroic verse, relating the biblical story of the Fall of Man. There are classical allusions and digressions into contemporary religious topics, Peyton writing as an opponent of the Puritans. In 1623 he continued the work in The Glasse of Time in the Second Age, and brought the scriptural narrative to Noah's entrance into the ark. A reprint appeared at NeinYork in 1886.
