= A418 road =

Road in England

A418

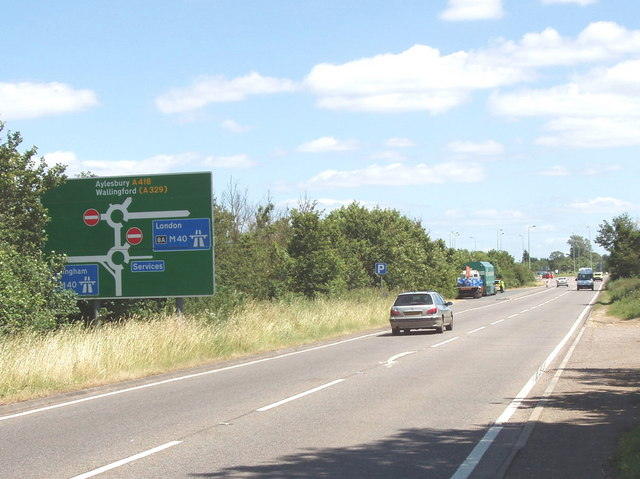
- A418 crosses the M40 near Wheatley

Route information
- Length: 20 mi (32 km)

Major junctions
- Northeast end: Leighton Buzzard
- A4146 A4157 A413; A41; A40 M40
- Southwest end: Thame

Location
- Country: United Kingdom

Road network
- Roads in the United Kingdom; Motorways; A and B road zones

The A418 road is a main trunk road in Buckinghamshire and Oxfordshire, England. It begins at a roundabout with the A4146 just north of Ascott, near Leighton Buzzard. It then runs south as a single carriageway through Wing to Aylesbury. This stretch is proposed for a dual carriageway bypass. After diving through Aylesbury the road runs past Aylesbury College before heading out into Stone. From there it runs past Haddenham to the M40 near Thame. The road has been rerouted in two locations so that it no longer runs through Hulcott and Haddenham.

== Oxford–Cambridge Expressway ==
The Oxford–Cambridge Expressway is a proposed fully grade separated dual carriageway between the A34 near Oxford and the A14 near Cambridge. One of the three alternative options originally proposed for the route uses the A418 corridor, bypassing Aylesbury to the north. In September 2018, the Government announced that the route would more closely follow East West Rail, which may mean that it will be closer to Winslow than to Aylesbury.

== Settlements on the A418 ==
From the A4146 in Buckinghamshire:

- Ascott
- Wing
- Rowsham
- Bierton
- Aylesbury
- Hartwell
- Stone
- Gibraltar

In Oxfordshire:

- Thame
- North Weston
- Tiddington
