= Royston Cave =

Cave in Royston, England

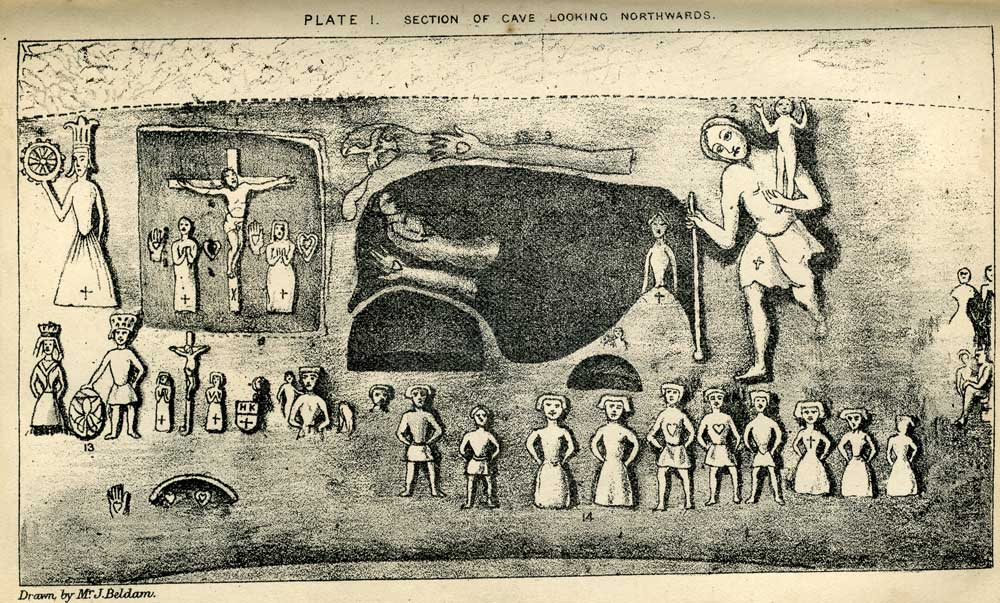
- Plate I from Joseph Beldam's book The Origins and Use of the Royston Cave, 1884

- Location within Hertfordshire
- 52.048333°N 0.022778°W
- Location: Royston, Hertfordshire, England

History
- Built: Unknown, rediscovered in 1742; 284 years ago

Site notes
- Material: Chalk
- Length: 8 m (26 ft)
- Width: 5 m (16 ft)
- Owner: Royston Town Council
- Public access: Yes

Identifiers
- NHLE: 1015594

Scheduled monument
- Designated: 18 August 1923

Royston Cave is an ancient artificial cave with an entrance in Katherine's Yard, Melbourn Street, Royston, England. Rediscovered in 1742, it is located in the town centre at the crossroads of two ancient routes: Ermine Street and the Icknield Way. It is protected as both a scheduled ancient monument and a Grade I listed building. The origin and purpose is unknown. It has been speculated that it was used by the Knights Templar, who founded the nearby town of Baldock, but this is an unlikely explanation despite its popular appeal. There are numerous other theories about the cave, covering Freemasons as well as a prison, a storage place or an anchorite cell. However, none of these theories has enough evidence to warrant being favoured by the Cave Trust, which runs the site. It is open to the public on Saturday, Sunday and Bank Holiday afternoons between April and September.

The Cave is a circular, bell-shaped chamber cut into the chalk bedrock. It is 8 metres (26 feet) high and 5 metres (17 feet) in diameter, with a circumferential octagonal podium. This cave is unique in western Europe for the numerous medieval carvings on the walls; comparable examples exist only in the former Czechoslovakia and in Palestine. Some of the figures are thought to be those of St. Catherine of Alexandria, St. Lawrence and St. Christopher.

== Main theories ==
Royston Cave has been the source of much speculation, although it is hard to determine much about its origin and function.

- Knights Templar: It has been speculated that the cave may have been used by the Knights Templar before their dissolution by Pope Clement V in 1312. Although claims have been made that this religious-military institution of the Catholic Church held a weekly market at Royston between 1199 and 1254, the market charter was in fact granted to the Augustinian Canons of the town. It is believed that the cave was divided into two levels by a wooden floor, the evidence consisting of a single posthole and what may be beam slots to secure the platform to the walls. Two figures close together near the damaged section may be all that remains of a known Templar symbol, two knights riding the same horse. However, as the image has been repaired in modern times, this cannot be confirmed. In 1953, the architectural historian, Nikolaus Pevsner, wrote that the date of the carvings "is hard to guess. They have been called Anglo-Saxon, but are more probably of various dates between the C14 and C17 (the work of unskilled men)". This would place the carvings after the time of the Templars; certainly the figures in armour are wearing full plate, which would date them to a century after the Templars' demise.
- Early Freemason's Lodge.
- Augustinian store house: It has been claimed it was used by Augustinian monks from the local priory, who would have required a cool store under the market square for their produce.
- The idea that it might have been a meeting place for recusant Catholics during the Reformation of the 16th century has little to recommend it.

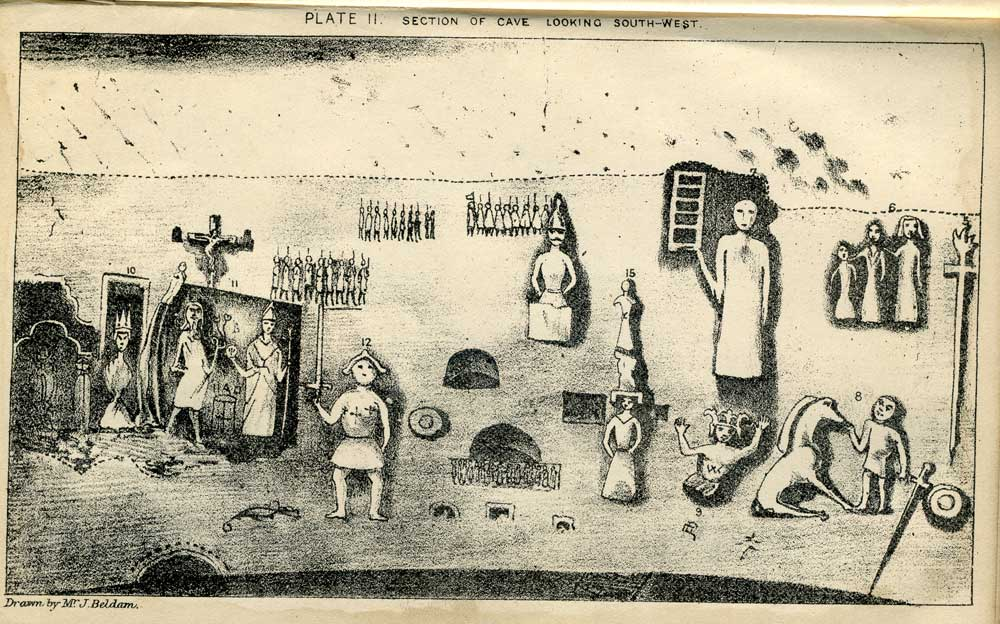
Plate II from Joseph Beldam's book The Origins and Use of the Royston Cave, 1884, showing more of the carvings.

- The private chapel of a notable local figure, suggested to be Lady Rohais or Roysia, wife of Eudo Dapifer, by local historian Alfred Kingston.
- A wayside hermitage or anchorite's cell. An anchorite was a religious devotee who chose to be sealed inside a cell for life. The position of the cave at a crossroads may have allowed its occupant to receive alms from travellers.

== Rediscovery ==
Although the origin of the cave is unknown, its rediscovery is well documented. In August 1742 a workman dug a hole in the Butter Market to build footings for a new bench for the patrons and traders. He discovered a buried millstone and dug around it to remove it. He found a shaft leading down into the chalk. When discovered, the cavity was more than half-filled with earth. The rumour spread that there must be a treasure buried beneath the soil inside the cave. Several cartloads of soil were removed until bedrock was reached. This revealed the carvings around the lower walls. The soil was discarded as worthless as it only contained a few old bones and fragments of pottery. Today's archaeology could have analysed the soil in depth. The Reverend G North's description of a brown earthenware cup with yellow spots discovered in the soil filling the cave sounds like a well-known early post-medieval type, no earlier than the late 16th century.Today the access to the cave is not by the original opening, but by a passage dug in 1790.

The cave is at the junction of an ancient east-west track, the Icknield Way, and the north-south Roman road, Ermine Street. Icknield Way was used during the Iron Age and traces of its side ditches have been excavated at Baldock. It has been claimed to run from the Thames Valley towards East Anglia, although this has recently been called into question. The modern-day A505 between Royston and Baldock approximately follows its route.

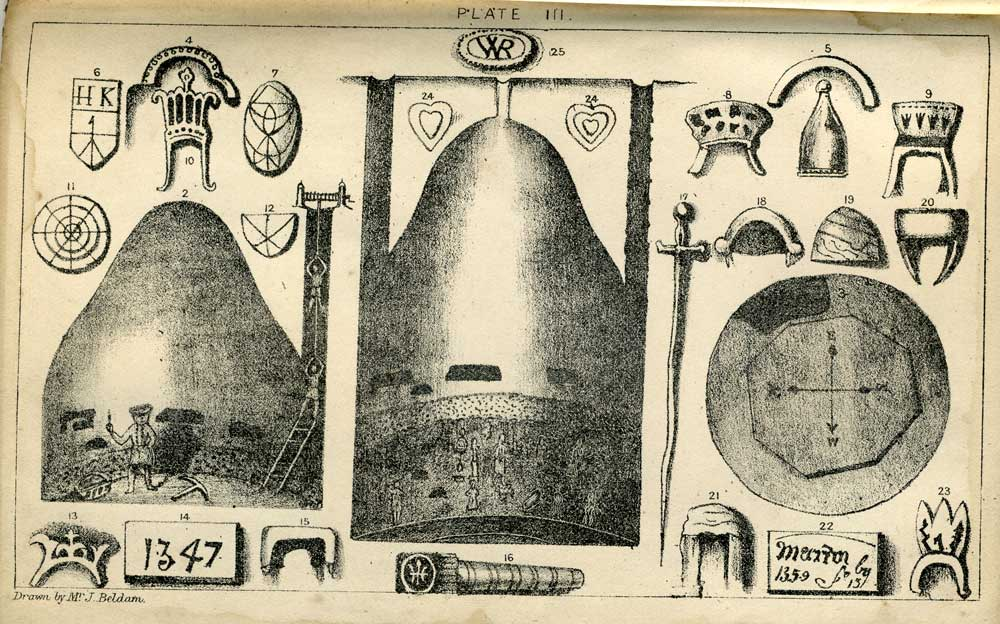
Plate III from Joseph Beldam's book The Origins and Use of the Royston Cave, 1884 showing the shape and floor plan.

It is thought that the carvings were originally coloured, but little trace of this is visible now; in the mid 19th century, Joseph Beldam could still see the yellow dress of St Catherine and the red of the Holy Family. They are mostly religious images, such as the Crucifixion and various saints. St Lawrence is depicted holding the gridiron on which he was martyred. A crowned figure holding a wheel appears to be St Catherine, and a large figure with a staff and a child on his shoulder represents St Christopher. A figure with a drawn sword could be St Michael or possibly St George. Another possibly religious symbol is the depiction of a naked woman known as a Sheela na Gig. This figure is sometimes found on medieval churches so its inclusion with religious symbolism is not out of place. There are a number of holes, sometimes directly beneath the sculptures, which are thought to have held candles or lamps which would have illuminated the carvings.

== Restoration ==
In 2010, it was discovered that due to damp conditions in the cave insect larvae and worms were infesting and damaging the walls and carvings, and restoration works were initiated. In August 2014, it was reported that the work to remove the threat of the chalk-eating worms had been successful. James Robinson, cave manager, said: "Controlling the worm population presented a different challenge as it was felt unwise to use biocides or gas in a space like the cave which is regularly open to the public. The most practical approach was, therefore, to reduce the worms’ habitat. This involved removing the large volumes of soil and other debris at the base of the cave, particularly on the step below the carvings. Without their food the earthworms and brandling worms soon moved on". Repair work to water pipes was also carried out as water seeping into the cave had caused cracks to appear in the carvings. Traffic vibration from vehicles using the road above the cave could still cause problems if changes to road use were to occur.

Despite the restoration, in November 2018, the Cave was added to Historic England's Heritage at Risk Register. It was subsequently the subject of a BBC News television report.

== Sources ==
General

- Guide to Royston Cave (pamphlet) Local History Series 1999 Royston and District Local History Society.
- Beldam, Joseph. The Origins and Use of the Royston Cave, Being the substance of a Report, some time since presented to The Royal Society of Antiquaries (John Warren, 1884). Available at Google Books.
- Nikolaus Pevsner, The Buildings of England: Hertfordshire, 1953.

== Bibliography ==
- North, G. (1742). Letter on a Vault Discovered at Royston, Herts. Proceedings of the Society of Antiquaries of London. Minute Book IV. p. 133.
- Stukeley, W. (1743). Palaeographia Britannica: or, Discourses on Antiquities in Britain. Number I. Origines Roystonianæ, or, an account of the Oratory of Lady Roisia, Foundress of Royston, discovered at Royston, in August 1742. London: R. Manby.
- Parkin, C. (1744). An Answer To, Or Remarks Upon Dr. Stukeley’s, Origines Roystonianæ; Wherein, The Antiquity and Imagery of the Oratory, lately discovered at Royston in Hertfordshire, Are Truly Stated, and Accounted For. London: J. Hoyles
- Stukeley, W. (1746). Palaeographia Britannica: or, Discourses on Antiquities in Britain. Number II. Origines Roystonianæ, Part II. or a defence of Lady Roisia de Vere, Foundress of Royston, against the calumny of Mr. Parkin rector of Oxburgh. wherein his pretended answer is fully refuted : the former opinion further confirmed and illustrated. To which occasionally are added, many curious matters in antiquity : and fix copper-plates. Stamford: F. Howgrave.
- Beldam, J. (1898). The Origin and Use of The Royston Cave. Fourth Edition. Royston: Warren Bros.
- Kingston, A. (1906). A History of Royston. Royston: Warren Bros.
- Beamon, S.P. and Donel, L.G. (1978). An Investigation of Royston Cave. Proceedings of the Cambridge Antiquarian Society. Volume LXVIII. Cambridge: The Burlington Press Ltd.
- Beamon, S.P. (1992). Royston Cave: Used By Saints or Sinners? Baldock: Cortney Publications. (ISBN 0-904378-40-3) doi:10.5284/1073080
- Houldcroft, P.T. (1995). The Medieval Structure within Royston Cave. Royston: Royston and District Local History Society.
- Houldcroft, P.T. (1998). A Pictorial Guide To Royston Cave. Royston: Royston and District Local History Society.
- Houldcroft, P.T. (2008). A Medieval Mystery at the Crossroads. Royston: Royston and District Local History Society.
