= Royston, Hertfordshire =

Town in Hertfordshire, England

Coordinates: 52.0471°N 0.0202°W

Royston
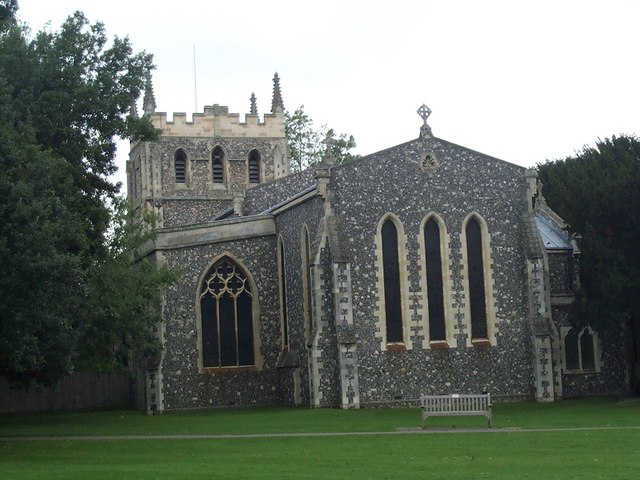
- Church of St John the Baptist

- Location within Hertfordshire
- Population: 17,444 (Parish, 2021); 17,445 (Built up area, 2021) (Note: Built up area populations are rounded to the nearest five.)
- OS grid reference: TL357406
- Civil parish: Royston
- District: North Hertfordshire
- Shire county: Hertfordshire
- Region: East
- Country: England
- Sovereign state: United Kingdom
- Post town: ROYSTON
- Postcode district: SG8
- Dialling code: 01763
- Police: Hertfordshire
- Fire: Hertfordshire
- Ambulance: East of England
- UK Parliament: North East Hertfordshire

Royston is a town and civil parish in the North Hertfordshire district of Hertfordshire, England. It lies 18 miles (29 km) north of Hertford and 12 miles (19 km) south-west of Cambridge. The Greenwich Meridian runs through the eastern part of the town. At the 2021 census, the parish had a population of 17,444.

The county boundary between Hertfordshire and Cambridgeshire historically ran east–west through the centre of town along the middle of Baldock Street and Melbourn Street. The boundary was adjusted in 1896 to place the town wholly in Hertfordshire.

== History ==
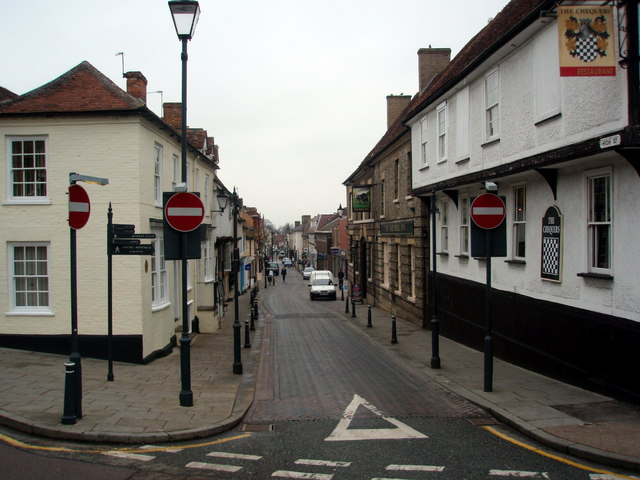
Looking north along High Street, Royston

The town grew at the crossing of two ancient thoroughfares, Ermine Street and the Icknield Way (cum Ashwell Street); the former was created after the Roman conquest, while the Icknield Way has long been accepted as a prehistoric routeway. The roads are sometimes called military roads as they were prepared or improved by Roman soldiers to facilitate access to the hinterland of Roman Britain. The path of Icknield Way is occupied by the present day A505, which bypasses the town to the north. The A10 follows the alignment of Ermine Street south of the town but diverts before it reaches the crossroads. The A1198, known as the Old North Road follows the alignment of Ermine Street northwards. Barrows on Goffers Knoll and Therfield Heath are evidence of prehistoric settlement.

A cross, variously known as Royse's, Rohesia's, or Roisia's Cross, was erected by the crossroads at an unknown date. It gave the settlement its earliest name of Crux Roesia or Roisia's Cross. The first recorded owner was Eudo Dapifer, steward to William the Conqueror. Eudo was married to Rohais, daughter of Richard Fitz Gilbert. By the 14th century this had become Roisia's Town, Roiston or Royston. A large boulder of red millstone grit, bearing a square socket, supposed to be the base of the cross, has been placed by the cross roads at the northern end of High Street.

Ralph de Rochester founded the Augustinian priory which originated as a chapel for three canons and was later expanded to seven or more regular canons. Royston had two hospitals or free chapels, as well as the monastery.

The hospital of St John and St Thomas was founded for lepers in 1224 by Richard Argentine, Sheriff of Cambridgeshire on the south side of Baldock Street.

The hospital of St Nicholas was situated in the Cambridgeshire side of Royston. It was founded in about 1200 probably by Amphelise, a daughter of Richard the Chamberlain. In 1213 King John granted a fair to celebrate the feast of St Nicholas (8–9 May). The patronage of the hospital descended to Sir Giles Argentine, lord of the manor of Melbourn, who also held the patronage of the other hospital. In the 14th century, St Nicholas' Hospital was put under the same jurisdiction as that of St John and St Thomas, which were subsequently suppressed in 1547.

The town having lost its monastic charter, the priory site was obtained by Robert Chester, a gentleman of the bedchamber to Henry VIII, who set up a market. Much of the town was given over to inns catering for travellers mainly travelling between London and York. After a visit in 1603, James VI and I decided to build a palace or hunting lodge in the town.

William Cobbett mentions the town (somewhat gloomily) in his Rural Rides:

After you quit Ware...the land grows by degrees poorer; the chalk lies nearer and nearer to the surface, till you come to the open common-fields within a few miles of Royston [which] is at the foot of this high poor land; or, rather in a dell, the open side of which looks towards the North. It is a common market town. Not mean, but having nothing of beauty about it...

Royston had a local bank, called the Royston Bank, from about 1806 to 1896, when it merged into the grouping that became Barclays. It was founded by Edward King Fordham and others, and the business was run by the influential local Fordham family.

A covered Corn Exchange was established on Market Hill 1829.

On 8 March 1991 the high pressure natural gas network was connected directly to the network supplying homes in Royston. This led to a surge of gas into homes, causing several explosions and fires. Only one significant injury was reported. British Gas stated that human error was responsible. The Health and Safety Executive launched a prosecution of British Gas but this was later withdrawn.

The Church of England parish church of St John the Baptist was severely damaged by a fire that broke out in the early morning of 9 December 2018, with the blaze destroying part of the roof and bell tower. Initially thought to be arson, a police investigation later concluded this not to be the case. The church was reopened in November 2022, almost four years after the fire, with an open day held on 26 November.

=== Royston Palace ===
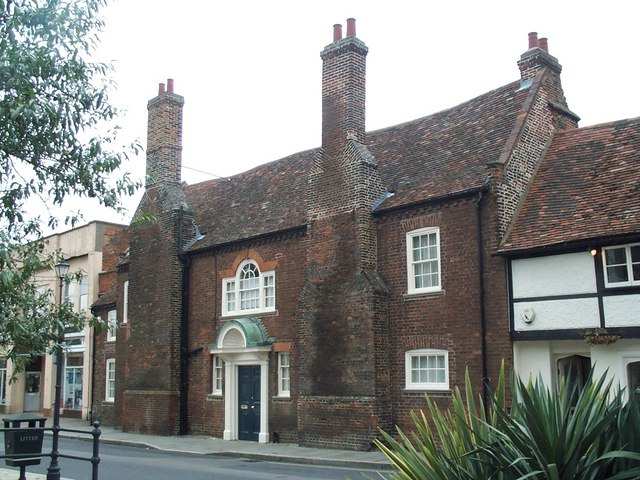
King James' Palace, Royston

On 29 April 1603 James VI and I, travelling to Westminster to be crowned as King of England, stayed overnight at the Chester residence. His grandmother Mary of Guise had stayed there in 1551. Attracted by the suitability of the area for hunting, James hired the house for a year. In 1604 he decided to create a royal hunting lodge in the town by demolishing the "Cock" and "Greyhound" inns. The king's lodgings were completed in 1607 and were described in 1652 as "all of brick well-tiled double-built, in length 78 ft., breadth 43 ft., height from eaves to ground 24 ft., thickness of walls 24 inches." The buildings were never big enough to cater for a full court, but provided a suitable spot for hunting, near enough to London for convenience and far enough away to deter intrusion. King James ordered a strict prohibition on anyone taking game from within 16 miles (26 km) of Royston, and an elaborate infrastructure was established to support him in the pursuit of his sport. He returned almost every year to hunt and shoot.

Queen Anne and Henry Frederick, Prince of Wales, visited the town once, in 1611–1612. The next year, the queen opposed the marriage of her daughter Princess Elizabeth to Frederick V of the Palatinate, but the king came to Royston with the Earl of Rochester to negotiate the dowry, and a marriage contract was signed there. Following the marriage, celebrated on St Valentine's Day 1613, the king, Prince Charles (later King Charles I), and Frederick came to stay at Royston. In February 1616, a room in the palace was arranged as a theatre for the performance of a comedy.

James's successor, Charles I, visited Royston less often than his father. In June 1647, during the English Civil Wars, Charles was brought through the town as a prisoner of the Parliamentary army. After Charles' execution, the royal buildings fell into disrepair. The Crown sold its last interests in the town in 1866.

== Governance ==
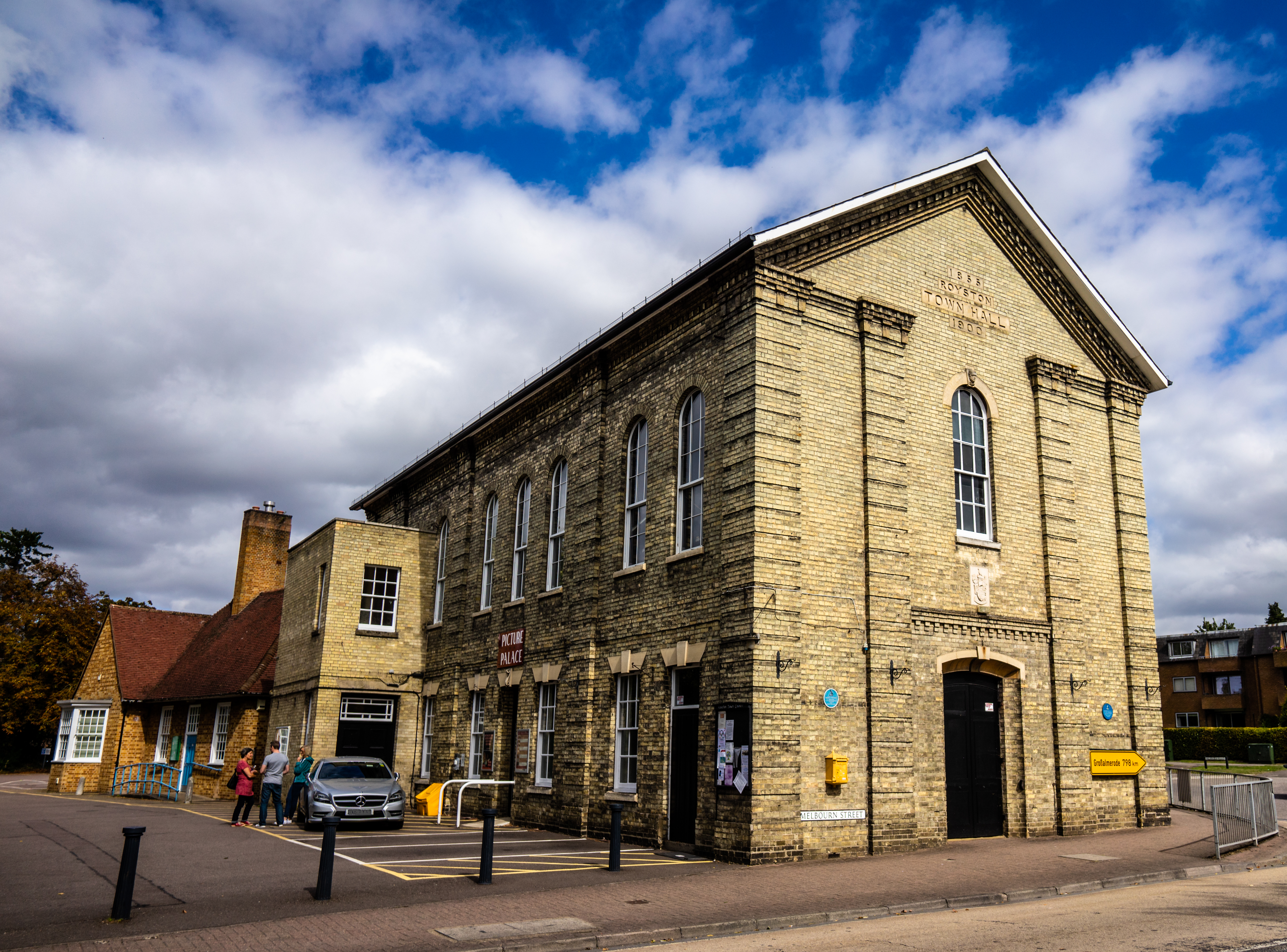
Royston Town Hall, Melbourn Street

Royston has three tiers of local government at parish (town), district and county level: Royston Town Council, North Hertfordshire District Council, and Hertfordshire County Council. The town council is based at Royston Town Hall on Melbourn Street.

Since 2009, the town has had a Business Improvement District (BID), branded Royston First.

=== Administrative history ===
The parish of Royston was created in 1540 from parts of the parishes of Barkway, Reed and Therfield in Hertfordshire and Melbourn and Kneesworth in Cambridgeshire. The county boundary was not changed at that time, so the new parish straddled Hertfordshire and Cambridgeshire.

In 1835, the Royston poor law union was created, covering a number of parishes in Hertfordshire, Cambridgeshire, and Essex. A workhouse was built on Baldock Road in Royston, opening in 1836. In 1872, the board of guardians of the poor law union was given public health and local government responsibilities for the area, which was thereafter also called the Royston Rural Sanitary District. In 1879, they established a special drainage district for the town of Royston. By this time the urban area extended beyond the Tudor parish boundaries, and so the special drainage district was drawn to also include parts of the neighbouring parishes of Bassingbourn, Kneesworth, Melbourn, and Therfield.

Under the Local Government Act 1894, rural sanitary districts became rural districts with their own elected councils, but where rural sanitary districts straddled county boundaries, as Royston Rural Sanitary District did, they were to be split into separate rural districts in each county, unless boundaries were otherwise adjusted. A joint committee of Hertfordshire and Cambridgeshire County Councils held inquiries during 1894 trying to reach agreement as to how best to deal with Royston. No solution that would keep the town together could be found that was acceptable to the two county councils. Therefore, when the Local Government Act came into force at the end of the year, Royston parish was split along the county boundary through the middle of the town into a Royston (Hertfordshire) parish and a Royston (Cambridgeshire) parish.

The Hertfordshire parts of the Royston Rural Sanitary District, including the Royston (Hertfordshire) parish, became the Ashwell Rural District, whilst the Cambridgeshire and Essex parts of the rural sanitary district, including the Royston (Cambridgeshire) parish, became the Melbourn Rural District. The Royston Special Drainage District was likewise split into a North Royston Special Drainage District and a South Royston Special Drainage District, with the two areas being administered by the new rural district councils.

The question of how the town of Royston should be governed took another couple of years to resolve. Competing proposals were put forward from the two county councils, with both Cambridgeshire and Hertfordshire wanting the whole town. Eventually, the Local Government Board directed that town should all be placed in Hertfordshire, and on 30 September 1896 the parish of Royston (Cambridgeshire) and the parts of the Cambridgeshire parishes of Bassingbourn, Kneesworth, and Melbourn that were within the North Royston Special Drainage District were transferred to Hertfordshire. As a temporary measure, these areas became the parishes of North Royston, South Bassingbourn, South Kneesworth, and South Melbourn, and were all included within the Ashwell Rural District, pending such time as Hertfordshire County Council was able to establish an urban district for the town.

On 1 October 1897, a year and a day after the county boundary change, an urban district was established for Royston. The new urban district of Royston covered the parishes of Royston, North Royston, South Bassingbourn, South Kneesworth, South Melbourn, and the part of Therfield parish in the South Royston Special Drainage District, in effect giving the new urban district the same boundaries as the original special drainage district of 1879. The area also became a single parish called Royston, governed by the urban district council.

Royston Urban District Council held its first meeting on 1 October 1897 at the Institute on Melbourn Street. The first chairman of the council was Joseph Phillips, a Conservative, who was also the chairman of the Royston Board of Guardians and the Ashwell Rural District Council. Royston Urban District Council purchased the Institute in 1900, renaming it Royston Town Hall.

Royston Urban District was abolished in 1974 under the Local Government Act 1972, when district-level functions passed to the new North Hertfordshire District Council. At the same time, a successor parish called Royston was created covering the former urban district, with its parish council taking the name Royston Town Council.

The parish was enlarged in 1989, when the county and parish boundaries north of the town were adjusted to follow the line of the recently completed A505 bypass.

=== Coat of arms ===
Coat of arms, granted 1952

Royston Urban District Council was granted a coat of arms on 19 May 1952. Since the local government reorganisation of 1974, the arms have been used by the town council. The blazon of the arms is:

Argent a fesse gules thereon another chequy of the first and sable in chief two Tudor roses barbed and seeded and in the base a stag trippant the whole surmounting an archiepiscopal staff, all proper. And for a crest on a wreath of the colours, perched upon a representation of the Royse Stone, a hooded crow proper.

The symbols on the shield briefly illustrate the history of the town. The staff is for Royston Priory, the roses for Tudor connections, while James I is represented by the checky fesse of the Stewarts. The hart represents Hertfordshire. The crest depicts a hooded crow, known within the region as a "Royston crow". He stands on the "Royce Stone" in the town centre.

== Geography ==
The town lies on the northern slopes of the Hertfordshire Chalk Downs. The Greenwich Meridian, which passes through the town, is identified by a signpost on the north side of Newmarket Road.

At the 2021 census, the population of the parish was 17,444, and the population of the built-up area was reported as 17,445 (built-up area figures were all rounded to the nearest 5).

== Transport ==
Royston sits at the junction of the A10 and A505 roads, both of which are important road links through Hertfordshire and beyond. The town is also convenient for fast links to London and the north, as it is only a short distance from both the A1(M) and M11 motorways.

Nearby air transport links include Luton Airport and Stansted Airport, both of which are major air hubs in the South of England.

Royston railway station provides direct commuter links to both London Kings Cross and Cambridge railway station. It is on the Cambridge Line and is a stopping point for regular services operated by Govia Thameslink Railway.

Royston is served by local buses to Cambridge, Letchworth and Buntingford, operated by Richmonds and A2B Travel.

A new rail crossing for pedestrians and cyclists was opened in 2012. The £3.25 million subway links the northern part of the town with the leisure centre and the main complex of schools at the 'Coombes Hole' allotment gardens area. In 2007 the scheme became one of 79 Sustrans Connect2 projects to receive Big Lottery funding.

== Schools ==
Royston's schools are arranged as follows:

- First Schools (Years Reception–4) : Icknield Walk First School; Roman Way Academy; Studlands Rise First School; Tannery Drift First School.
- Middle and Upper schools (Years 5–11): King James Academy Royston (formed as a combination of Greneway Middle School, Roysia Middle School and the Meridian School)
- Additionally there is St Mary's Roman Catholic Primary School (Years N-6)

== Media ==
Local news and television programmes are provided by BBC East and ITV Anglia. Television signals are received from the Sandy Heath TV transmitter.

The town is covered by both BBC Three Counties Radio and BBC Radio Cambridgeshire. Other radio stations including Heart Hertfordshire, Star Radio, and Royston Radio, a community based station.

The Royston Crow is the town's local weekly newspaper which publishes on Thursdays.

== Landmarks ==
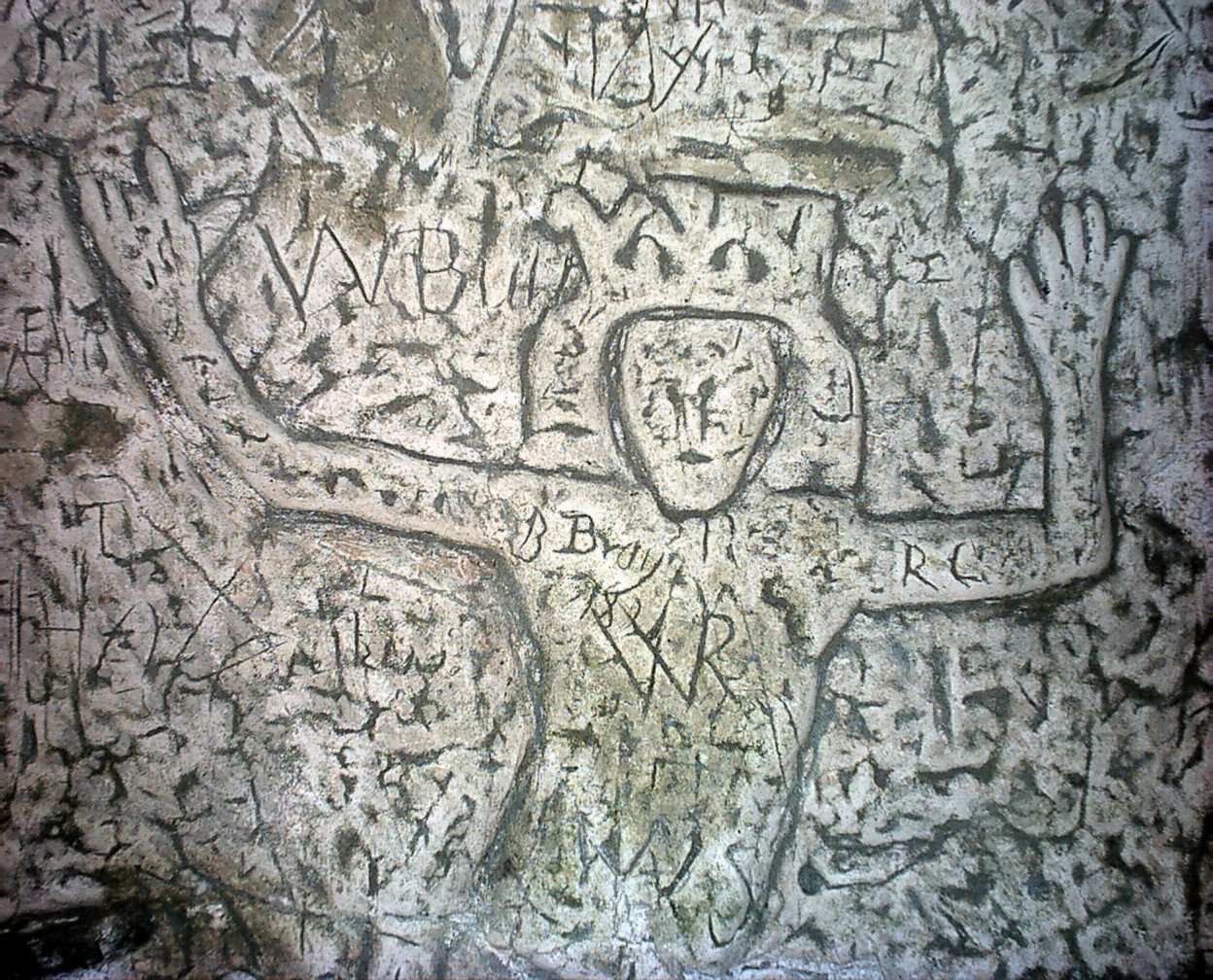
One of the carvings from the Royston Cave

The public open space and nature reserve of Therfield Heath (also known as Royston Heath) overlooks the town from a hill to the south-west. The Icknield Way Path passes through the village on its journey of 110 miles (180 km) from Ivinghoe Beacon in Buckinghamshire to Knettishall Heath in Suffolk.

In 1742 a strange cave carved out of the chalk was discovered in the centre of Royston. Royston Cave is located underneath the central crossroads of the town. The carvings in the cave have led to much speculation about the origin and function of the cave.

== Popular culture ==
Royston Arts Festival was revived in 2007 and now runs annually around the last week of September or the first week of October. Royston Town Band is a brass band that was founded in the mid-19th century as the Royston Volunteer Band. The band celebrated its 150th anniversary in 2014.

The Battle of Royston was a fictional battle in William Le Queux' The Invasion of 1910. The book describes how a German Army invades England through East Anglia and marches on London. Royston is where a battle takes place which fails to halt their advance.

In the 1965 fictional children's television series, Thunderbirds, one eccentric puppet character who was involved in a rescue mission was called Deborah the Duchess of Royston. The episode was called "The Duchess Assignment".

Royston was the home town of writer Geoff McQueen who devised the 1980s TV series The Bill. The fictional home station Sun Hill was named after the Royston street of the same name.

Royston is a named location toward the end of the novel About a Boy, but is not named in the film adaptation.

Royston is the hometown of Dr. Sharon on Ted Lasso.

== Town partnerships ==
Royston and District Twinning Association coordinates twinning relationships with the following partner towns:

- Großalmerode, Hessen, Germany
- La Loupe, Eure-et-Loir, France
- Villanueva de la Cañada, Comunidad de Madrid, Spain

== Sport and leisure ==
Royston Golf Club is situated on the Therfield Heath and was established in 1892. Has 18 holes, a range of practice facilities, pro shop and welcoming clubhouse.

Royston has a Non-League football club, Royston Town F.C., which plays at Garden Walk. The football club currently plays in the Southern League Premier Division Central league.

Royston Sports Club, situated on the heath, is the home to the town's tennis, squash, hockey and rugby clubs, as well as youth football. Royston Rugby Club's 1st XV play in the Herts/Middlesex 1st division – its Girls' U15 side won the Herts Shield in 2011 and 2012.

== Notable people ==
Several notable people originate from Royston, including:

- Trumpeter Alison Balsom.
- Blues singer/guitarist Danny Bryant.
- Singing coach Carrie Grant.
- Television screenwriter Geoff McQueen.
- Husband and wife William Barrington-Coupe and Joyce Hatto, perpetrators of "the greatest hoax in classical music", moved to the town. A film was made by Victoria Wood about their life together in 2012 called Loving Miss Hatto.
- Theologian, and founder of Presbyterianism in England, Thomas Cartwright, is reported to have been born in Royston, and fellow theologian Edward Stallybrass.
- William Morton, theatre manager, born in 1838, grew up in Royston. Morton Street was named after his father, George, a leading light in the Royston Tradesmens' Benefit Society.
- Theatre director Robin Belfield, and meteorologist Simon King grew up in Royston.
- Poet Thomas Peyton, and anatomical modeller Joseph Towne were both born in the town.
- Astronomer and mathematician Henry Andrews moved to Royston in 1766 and is buried in the graveyard of St John's Church.
- British author Helen Bailey was a resident of the town at the time of her murder in April 2016.
- Thomas Kefford (fl. 1710–1750), a noted English clockmaker, ran his business at The Dial, Fore Street, in Royston.
