= Vincenzo Lunardi =

Italian aeronaut

- Born: 11 January 1754; Lucca, Republic of Lucca
- Died: 1 August 1806 (aged 52); Lisbon, Kingdom of Portugal
- Occupations: Inventor, balloonist
- Aviation career
- Famous flights: demonstration balloon flight, 15 September 1784
- Memorials: commemorative stone in Welham Green

Vincenzo Lunardi (11 January 1754 – 1 August 1806) was a pioneering Italian aeronaut, born in Lucca.

== Ascents in England ==
Vincenzo Lunardi's family were of minor Tuscan nobility from Lucca, and his father had married late in life. Vincenzo was one of three children. He travelled in France in his early years before being called home, where he was put into the diplomatic service. Vincenzo Lunardi came to England as Secretary to Prince Caramanico, the Neapolitan Ambassador.

=== 15 September 1784 ===
There was a flying craze in France and Scotland with James Tytler, Scotland's first aeronaut and the first Briton to fly, but even so and after a year since the invention of the balloon, the English were still sceptical, and so George Biggin and 'Vincent' Lunardi, "The Daredevil Aeronaut," together decided to demonstrate a hydrogen balloon flight at the Artillery Ground of the Honourable Artillery Company in London on 15 September 1784.

Because the 200,000-strong crowd (which included eminent statesmen and the Prince of Wales) had grown very impatient, the young Italian had to take off without his friend Biggin, and with a bag that was not completely inflated; he was accompanied by a dog, a cat and a caged pigeon. The flight from the Artillery Ground travelled in a northerly direction towards Hertfordshire, with Lunardi touching down briefly in a cornfield in the parish of North Mymms to release the cat which had become unwell. The field is opposite Queenswood School, north of Shepherds Way (B157) to the south-east of Brookmans Park. There is a commemorative stone in Welham Green, almost three miles to the north-west of the North Mymms landing spot, at a road junction called Balloon Corner. After the brief touchdown, Lunardi continued his flight before eventually bringing the balloon to rest in Standon Green End.

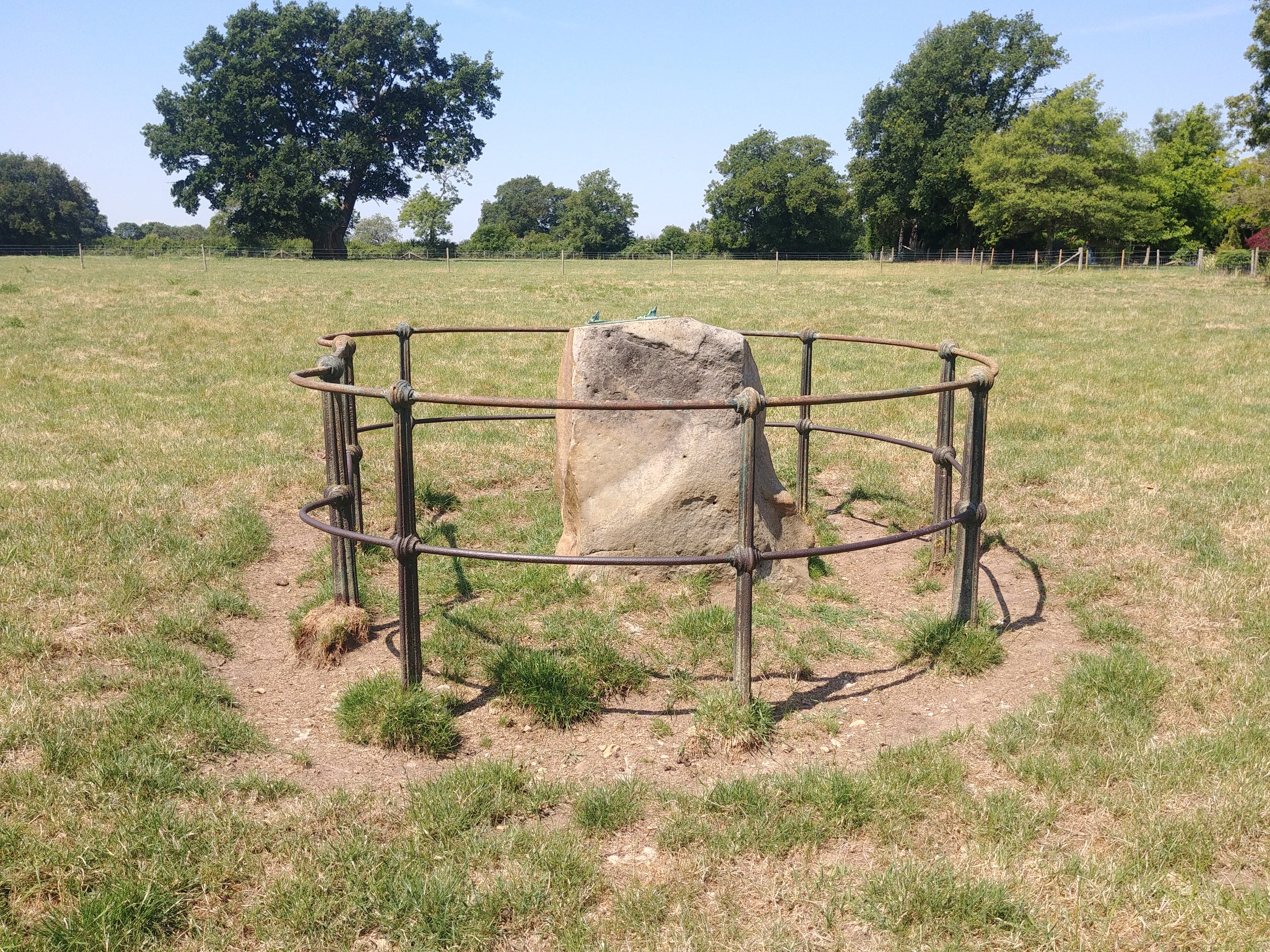
The stone at Standon Green End, Hertfordshire, where Lunardi ended the first manned flight over England

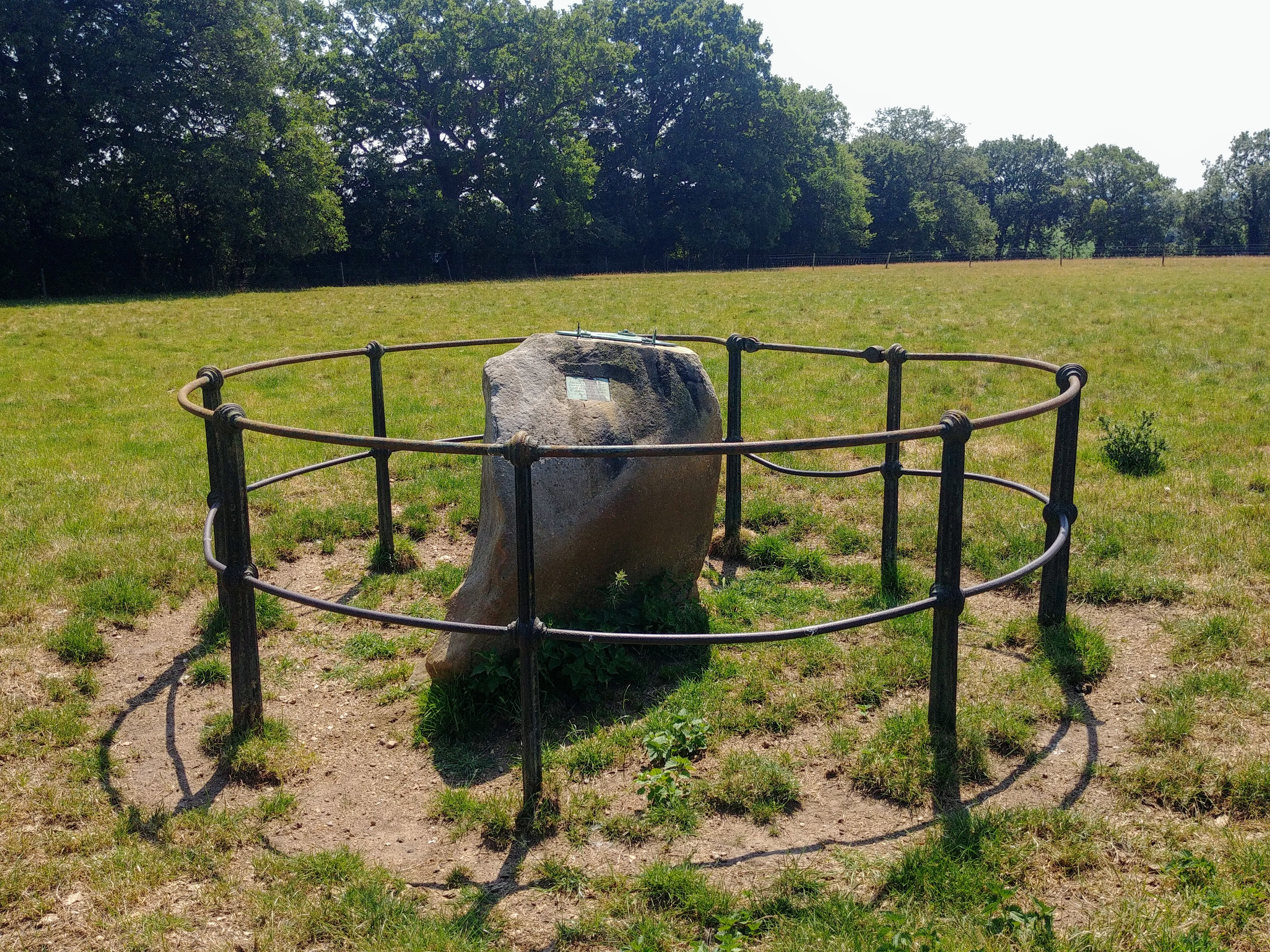
The stone marking the spot at Standon Green End, Hertfordshire, where Lunardi ended his flight

Lunardi's balloon was later exhibited at the Pantheon in Oxford Street.

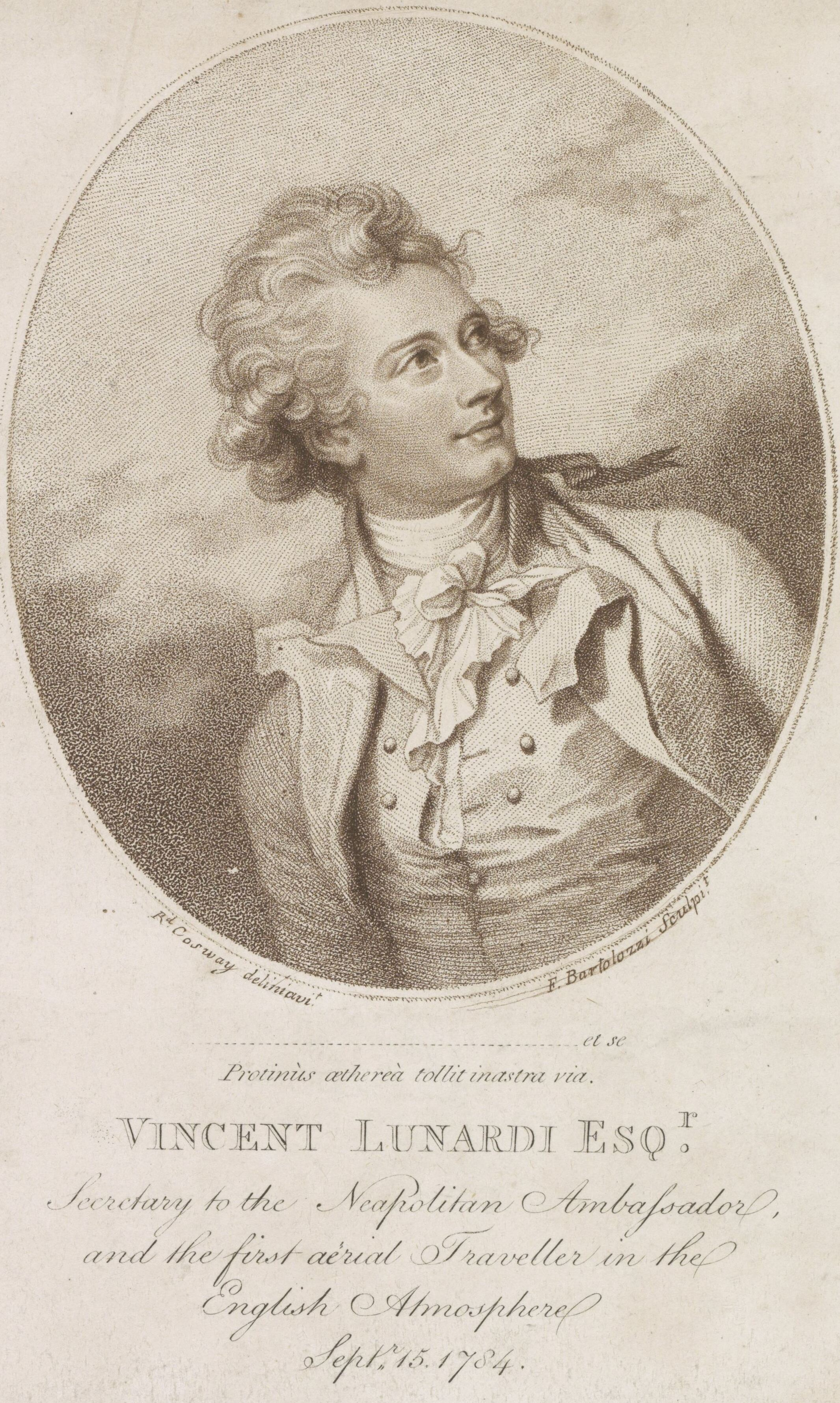
Portrait of Vincent Lunardi, 1784

Apparatus for filling M. Lunardi's balloon

The English Balloon and Appendages

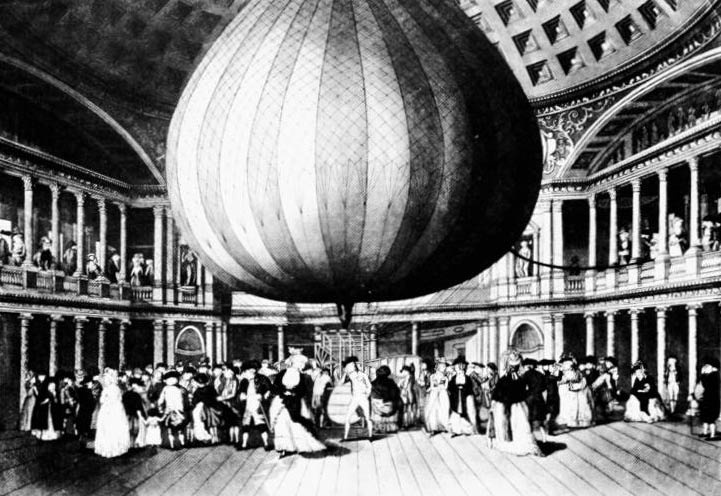
Exhibition of Lunardi's balloon at the Pantheon in Oxford Street

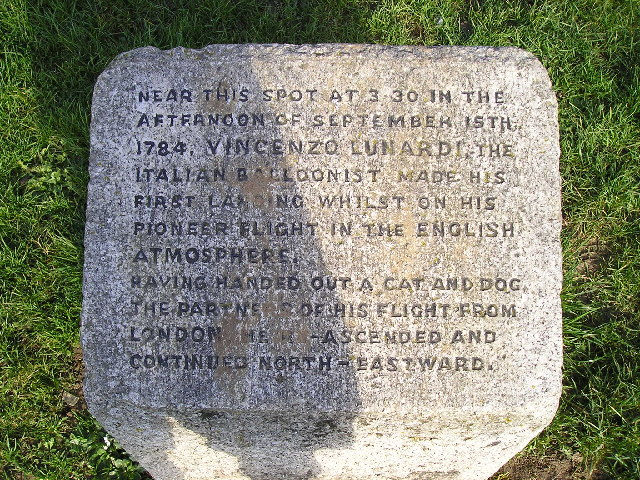
Balloon Corner, Welham Green. A stone commemorating the brief landing of the first (hydrogen) balloon flight in England

The 24-mile flight brought Lunardi fame and began the ballooning fad that inspired fashions of the day—Lunardi skirts were decorated with balloon styles, and in Scotland, the Lunardi Bonnet was named after him (balloon-shaped and standing some 600 mm tall), and is even mentioned by Scotland's national poet, Robert Burns, in his poem "To a Louse", written about a young woman called Jenny, who had a louse scampering in her Lunardi bonnet, "But Miss's fine Lunardi, fye". Lunardi published An Account of the First Aërial Voyage in England (1784), written as a series of letters to his guardian, Gherardo Campagni.

Doubt about the experiment still remained in England, at least in some circles. Samuel Johnson, in a letter to Richard Brocklesby (September 29, 1784), dismissed ballooning as "a species of amusement":

In amusement, mere amusement, I am afraid it must end, for I do not find that its course can be directed so as that it should serve any purposes of communication; and it can give no new intelligence of the state of the air at different heights, till they have ascended above the height of mountains, which they seem never likely to do.

=== 29 June 1785 ===
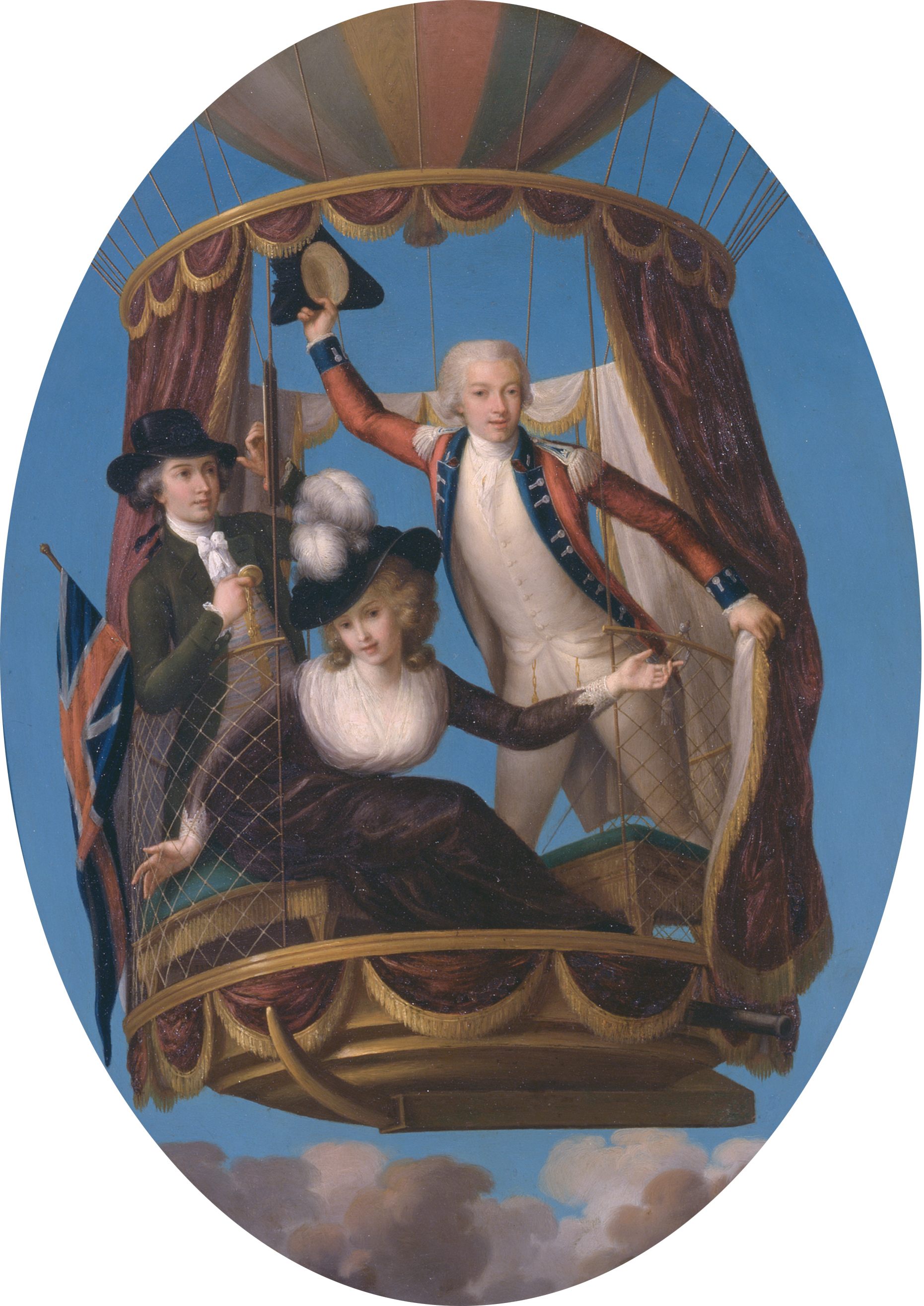
Captain Vincenzo Lunardi with his assistant George Biggin, and Mrs. Letitia Anne Sage, in a balloon (John Francis Rigaud, 1785)

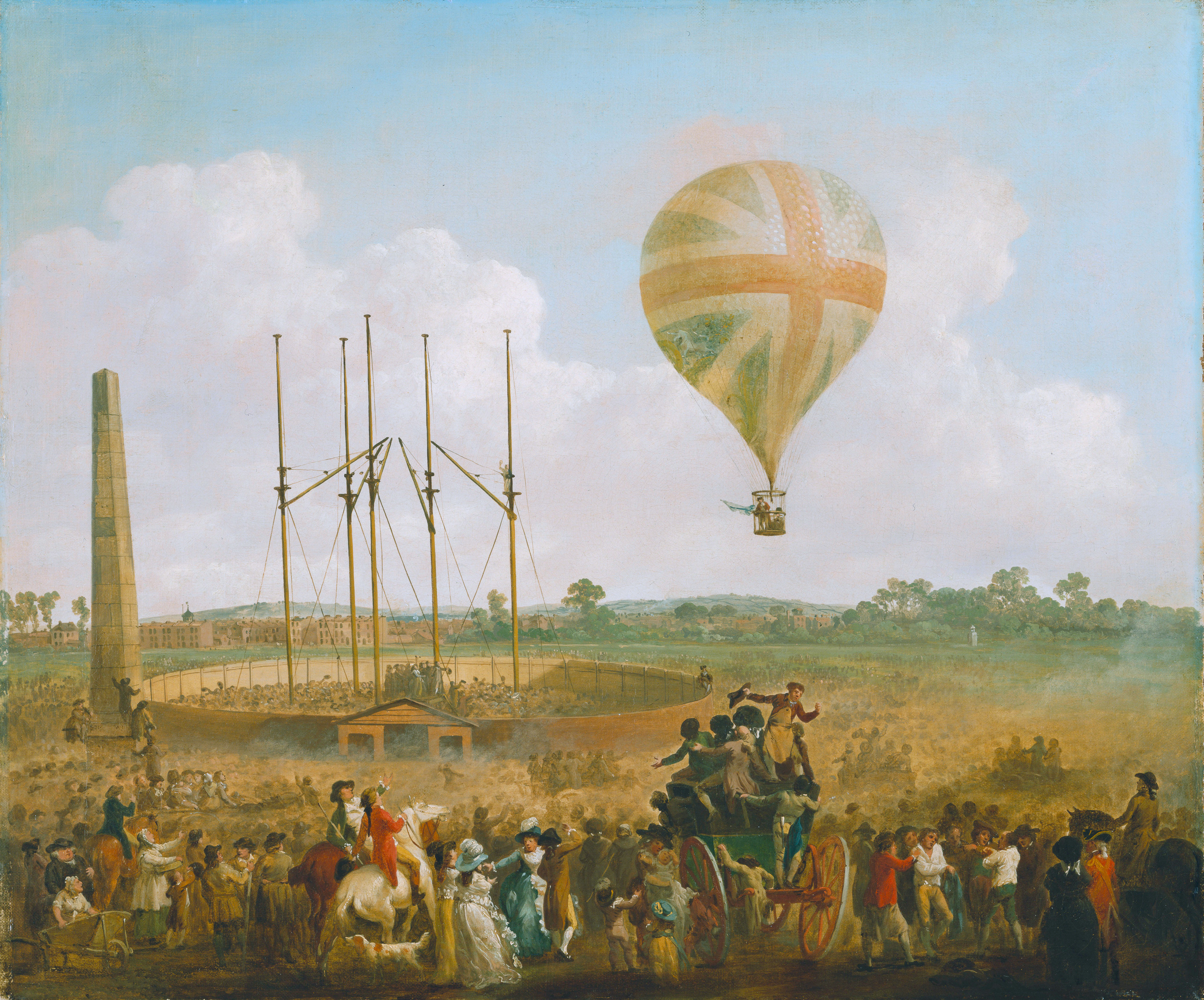
George Biggin (standing) and Mrs. Sage (seated) in Lunardi's balloon (Julius Caesar Ibbetson, 1785)

Lunardi's next flight was made nearly a year later on 29 June 1785 and left from St George's Fields on the south side of the Thames. Lunardi and Biggin, and two invitees, Letitia Ann Sage and Colonel Hastings, were supposed to make the flight, but the balloon would not take off because of the weight. Lunardi and Hastings stepped down, and the balloon took off with Biggin and Mrs. Sage, making her the first English female in flight. 90 minutes later, they landed near Harrow, where the two aeronauts had to be rescued by a group of boys from Harrow School from the angry farmer whose crops were damaged.

Lunardi then made flights in Liverpool on 20 July and 9 August that year before moving onto Glasgow and Edinburgh.

== Ascents in Scotland ==
Vincenzo made five flights in Scotland in his Grand Air Balloon—which was made of 140m^{2} of green, pink and yellow silk, and which was exhibited, 'suspended in its floating state' in the choir of St. Mungo's Cathedral in Glasgow for the admission charge of one shilling.

=== October 1785 ===
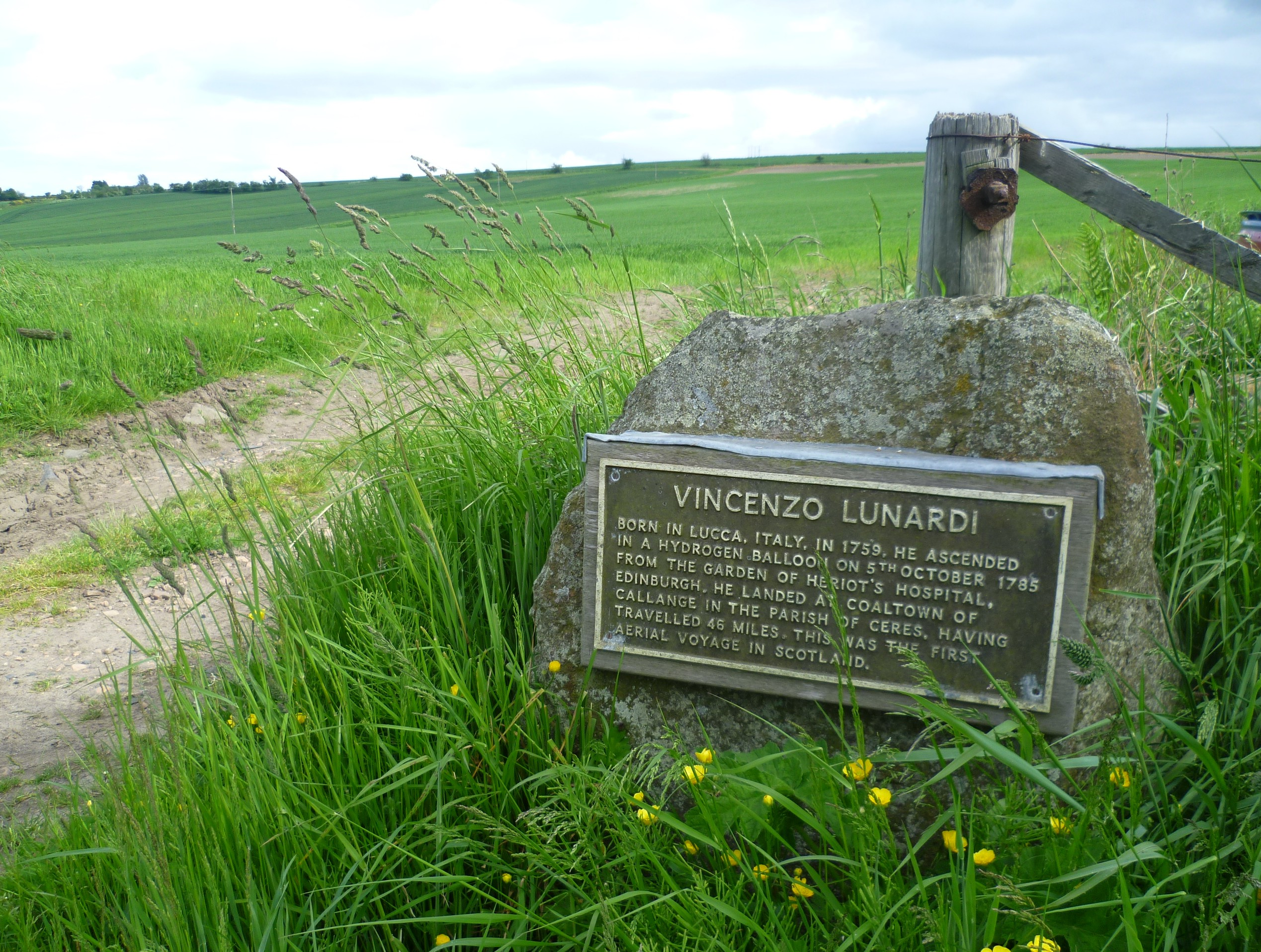
Plaque indicating the field where Lunardi landed after his first flight in Scotland

On 5 October 1785, a large and excited crowd filled the grounds of George Heriot's School in Edinburgh to see Lunardi's first Scottish hydrogen-filled balloon take off. The 46-mile flight over the Firth of Forth ended at Coaltown of Callange in the parish of Ceres, Fife. There is today a commemorative plaque nearby.

At the time, The Scots Magazine reported:

'The beauty and grandeur of the spectacle could only be exceeded by the cool, intrepid manner in which the adventurer conducted himself; and indeed he seemed infinitely more at ease than the greater part of his spectators.'

On 16 October 1785, he took off from the Knowes in Kelso. He made the first successful hydrogen balloon flight from Scotland to England.

=== 23 November 1785 ===
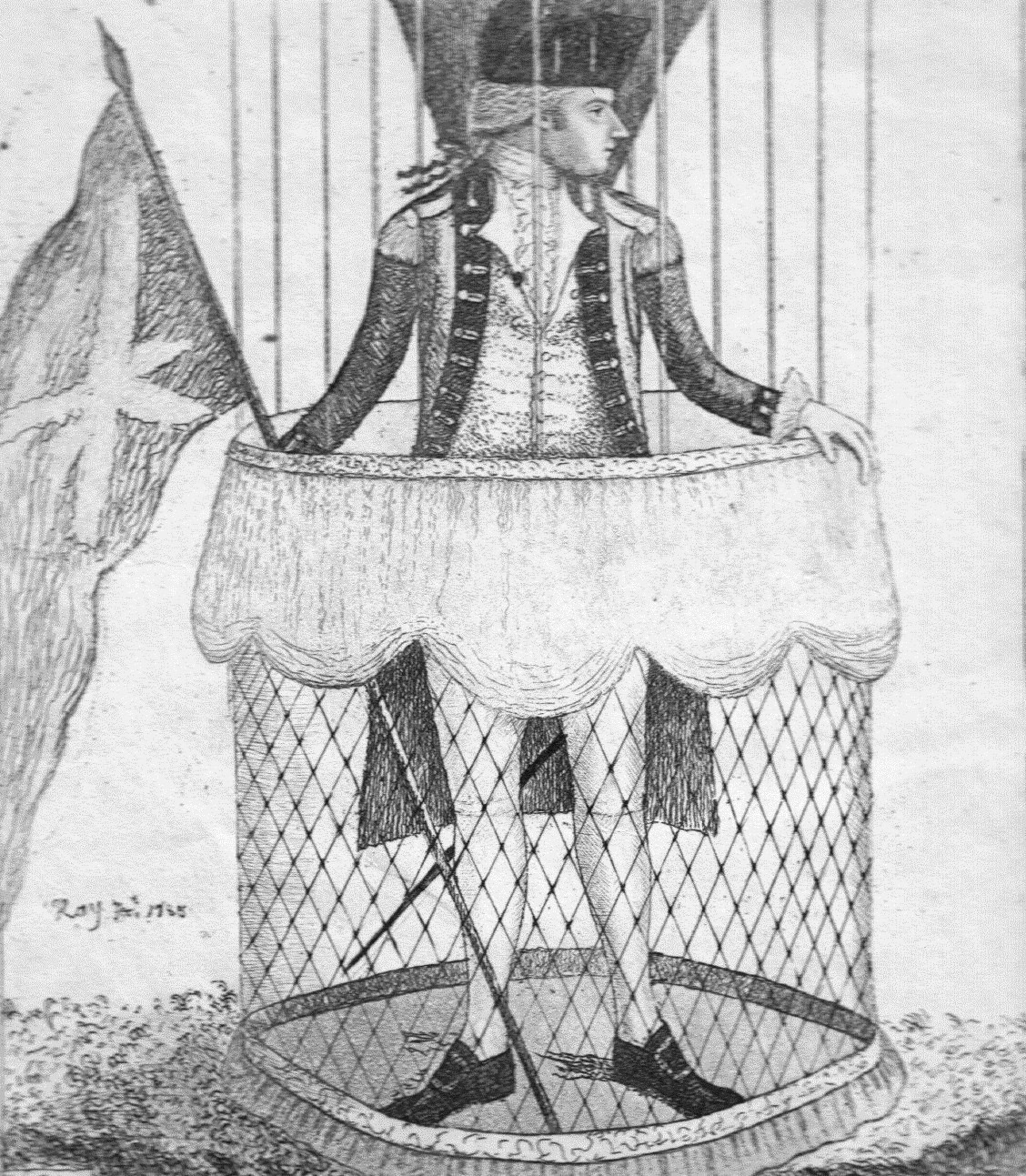
Vincent Lunardi, in his basket, ready to ascend (1785), by John Kay

The Glasgow Mercury newspaper ran adverts the following month announcing Lunardi's intention to 'gratify the curiosity of the public of Glasgow, by ascending in his Grand Air Balloon from a conspicuous place in the city'.

The weather was fine at about 14:00 on 23 November 1785 when Lunardi ascended into the atmosphere, to the astonishment of the spectators from St. Andrew's Square in Glasgow. The two-hour flight covered 110 miles and passed over Hamilton and Lanark before landing at the feet of 'trembling shepherds' in Hawick near the border with England.

=== 5 December 1785 ===
A couple of weeks later, in early December, a local man called Lothian Tam became entangled in the ropes and, as the balloon ascended—again from St. Andrew's Square in Glasgow, was lifted 6 metres before being cut loose and falling—with apparently no serious injury. The weather was worse on this flight—which had to end after just 20 minutes, with the Grand Balloon landing in Milton of Campsie—just over 10 miles from Glasgow. His landing, on 5 December 1785, is commemorated by a small plaque in the village.

=== 20 December 1785 ===
The next flight on 20 December 1785 was a disaster, though Lunardi survived. Seventy minutes after the ascent from the grounds of Heriot's Hospital in Edinburgh, Lunardi was forced down in the sea. He spent a long time in the North Sea until rescued by a passing fishing boat that docked at North Berwick. The diary of the Rev John Mill from Shetland states:

'A French man called Lunardi fled over the Firth of Forth in a Balloon, and lighted in Ceres parish, not far from Cupar, in Fife; and O! how much are the thoughtless multitude set on these and like foolish vanities to the neglect of the one thing needful. Afterwards, 'tis said, when soaring upwards in the foresaid machine, he was driven by the wind down the Firth of Forth, and tumbled down into the sea near the little Isle of May, where he had perished had not a boat been near who saved him and his machine.'

A short time later, Lunardi published An Account of five Aerial Voyages in Scotland (1786), written as a series of letters to his guardian, Gherardo Campagni.

Lunardi would subsequently invent a life-saving device for shipwrecked people. Called by the inventor his "aquatic machine" it was like a one-man lifeboat with an oar for steering. He successfully tested the machine in 1787.

=== 1786 ===
What was supposed to be his 12th launch at Newcastle upon Tyne in 1786 ended in a casualty, when Lunardi spilt sulfuric acid on the ground. Assistants restraining the already buoyant balloon fled from the place, which caused it to take off. One of them, Ralph Heron, the son of Mr. Heron, under-sheriff of Northumberland, had a rope twisted around his hand and could not disengage himself in time. He was drawn up in the air. Eventually, he fell to the ground and died a while later from internal injuries. The critical responses following this death made Lunardi leave Great Britain.

== Italy, Spain, and Portugal ==
Lunardi continued to make ascents in Italy, Spain and Portugal. He made an ascent by balloon near Mount Vesuvius in September 1789. He also made the first successful ascent by balloon in Sicily in July 1790. It lasted two hours.

Lunardi never married. He died in Lisbon, Portugal, in 1806.

There are portraits of Lunardi in the National Gallery of Scotland (engravings by Francesco Bartolozzi and Mariano Bovi). He was portrayed by Laurence Olivier in the 1936 film Conquest of the Air and celebrated musically in Lunardi's flight: a rondo for the harpsichord by the Scottish/Italian composer Domenico Corri.
