= Brookmans Park =

Village in Hertfordshire, England

Coordinates: 51.721°N 0.203°W

- Location within Hertfordshire
- Population: 3,475 (2001)
- OS grid reference: TL242041
- Civil parish: North Mymms
- District: Welwyn Hatfield
- Shire county: Hertfordshire
- Region: East
- Country: England
- Sovereign state: United Kingdom
- Post town: HATFIELD
- Postcode district: AL9
- Dialling code: 01707
- Police: Hertfordshire
- Fire: Hertfordshire
- Ambulance: East of England
- UK Parliament: Welwyn Hatfield

Brookmans Park is a village in Hertfordshire, southeast England, known for its BBC transmitter station. It is also a waypoint used in air navigation.

== History ==
=== The Brokemans ===
The Brokemans, known as "Manor of Mimmshall" owned by John Brokeman (died 1415), is where the name Brookmans Park originated.

The Gaussen family arrived in 1786, when Peter Gaussen bought the Brookmans estate for his son Samuel. In 1838 the Gaussens demolished the Gubbins manor house (he owned both houses and was jealous that Gobbins was better than his other, Brookmans).

In 1891, while the family were away on a holiday cruise, Brookmans Manor burned down, caused by a "painter using a blow lamp for exterior redecoration". Robert George Gaussen then had the stable block of the estate, now the Brookmans Park Golf Club House, converted to become his home.

In 1662 Peter Sambrooke purchased Nashes, alias Moffits, Farm. After the Great Plague Peter demolished the old farmhouse replacing it with Moffats House.

=== Gobions Estate ===
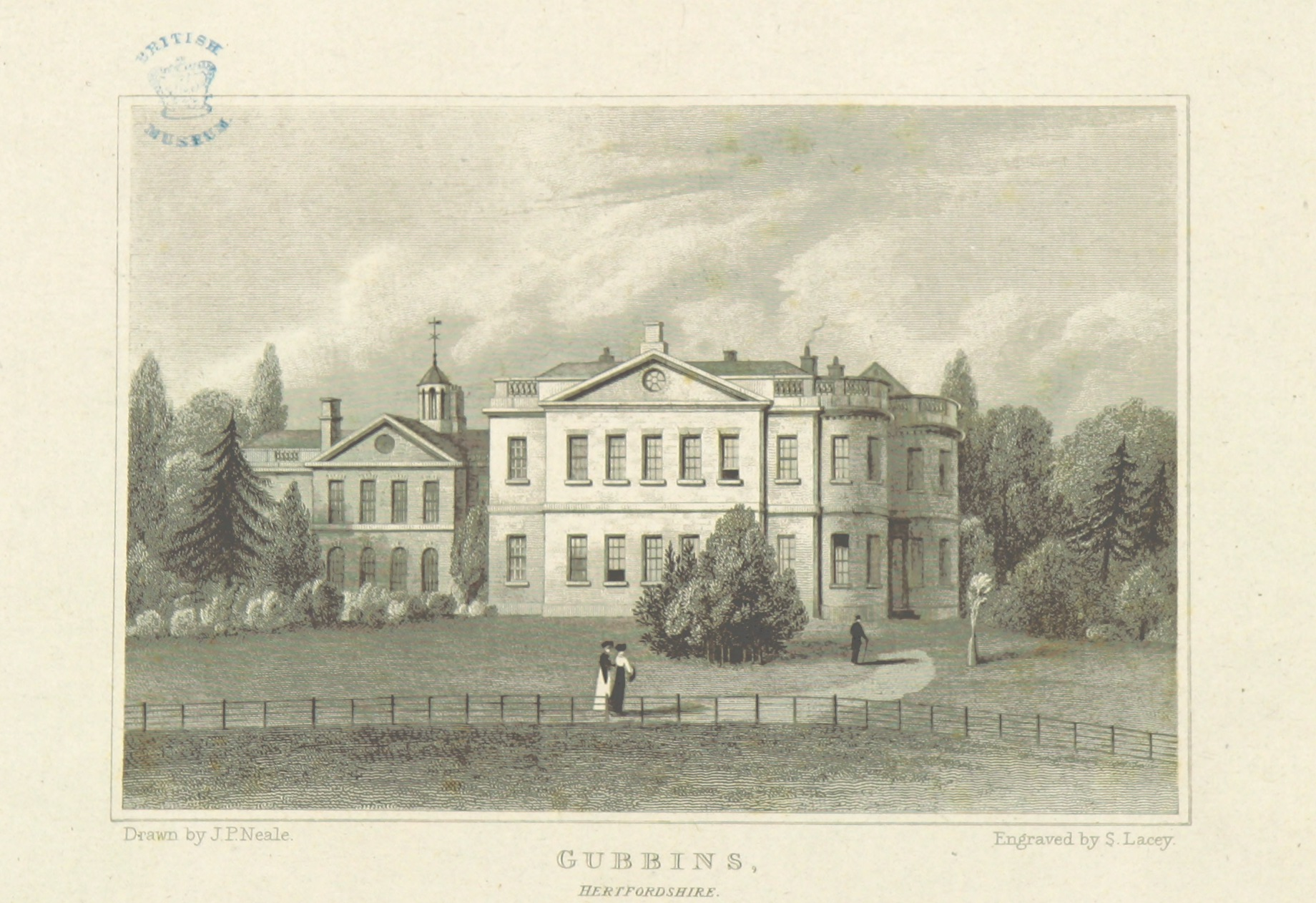
Gubbins

Gobions estate was transferred to John More in 1397: the house renamed More Hall. Sir John More became the owner. Edward VI gave this estate to the future Queen Elizabeth 1 in 1550 by and it was returned to the More family by Mary Tudor in 1553.

Gubbins mansion stood north of Gobions Pond where the back gardens of The Grove meet the wood. More Hall later became known under many names such as Gobions. Its name has varied over the centuries and through many ownerships.

It had reverted to Gubbens in the 17th century followed by Gubbins in the 18th. Originally the name came from Sir Richard Gobion in the twelfth century. The Gobions mansion was of such a fine quality with pleasure grounds designed by Charles Bridgeman, that it was visited by royalty. Now, virtually none of it remains, just a few scattered ruins.

==== Gobions Open Space ====
The Gobions Estate was an ancient private estate that flourished on merchant wealth near the village of Brookmans Park from the 14th to 18th centuries. The estate's lands now serve the community as a nature reserve and open space. It was owned by the now-defunct Gobions Woodland Trust. The nature reserve is now managed by the Herts and Middlesex Wildlife Trust as Gobions Wood, and another part as Gobions Open Space. It lies close to the Great North Road, adjacent to the village.

In 1956 North Mymms Parish Council acquired the land and the lake now known as Gobions Open Space, rescuing it from potential development. Twenty-nine years later in 1985, householders in the parish subscribed to a fund that helped the Gobions Woodland Trust buy the large remainder of the estate.

==== Folly Arch ====
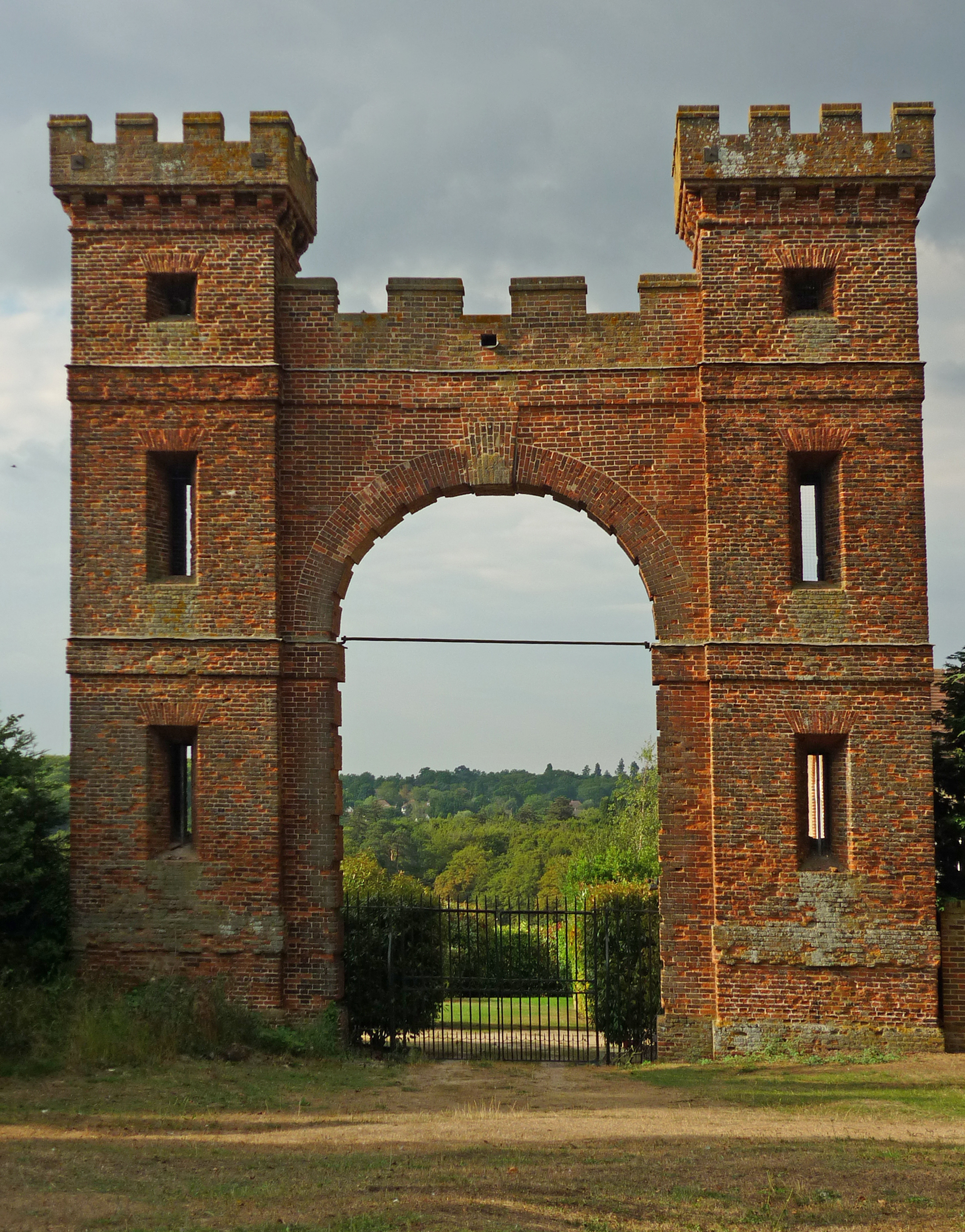
The Folly Arch

Folly Arch, a local landmark visible from Brookmans Park, north of Hawkshead Road between Brookmans Park and Potters Bar, was erected as one of the entrances to the Gobions estate as part of Charles Bridgeman's garden design for Sir Jeremy Sambrooke c. 1740 It is a Grade II* listed building.

The remains of a track can still be seen in the fields between Folly Arch and Gobions Wood, where there had previously been an avenue of lime trees leading from the arch to Gobions wood. These were destroyed during WWII by the farmer who owned the fields. The track then passes through the woods, crossing Ray Brook by means of a brick bridge which is now ruined but was usable as recently as the 1960s.

=== Birth of a village ===
In 1923 land from the Gobions Estate was bought by the White/Calder building syndicate who formed Brookmans Park (Hatfield) Ltd, to construct a commuter village. The London & North Eastern Railway built Brookmans Park Railway Station in 1926. Around the same time an 18-hole golf course was built on the land and the house, converted from stables, became the golf club. The BBC set up its transmitter station on the border of Brookmans Park and Bell Bar in 1929. In the late 1930s there was a building spree: 55 in 1936, 60 in 1937 - in Uplands Drive, The Grove, Kentish Lane and Westland Drive. 106 in 1938 and 52 in 1939.

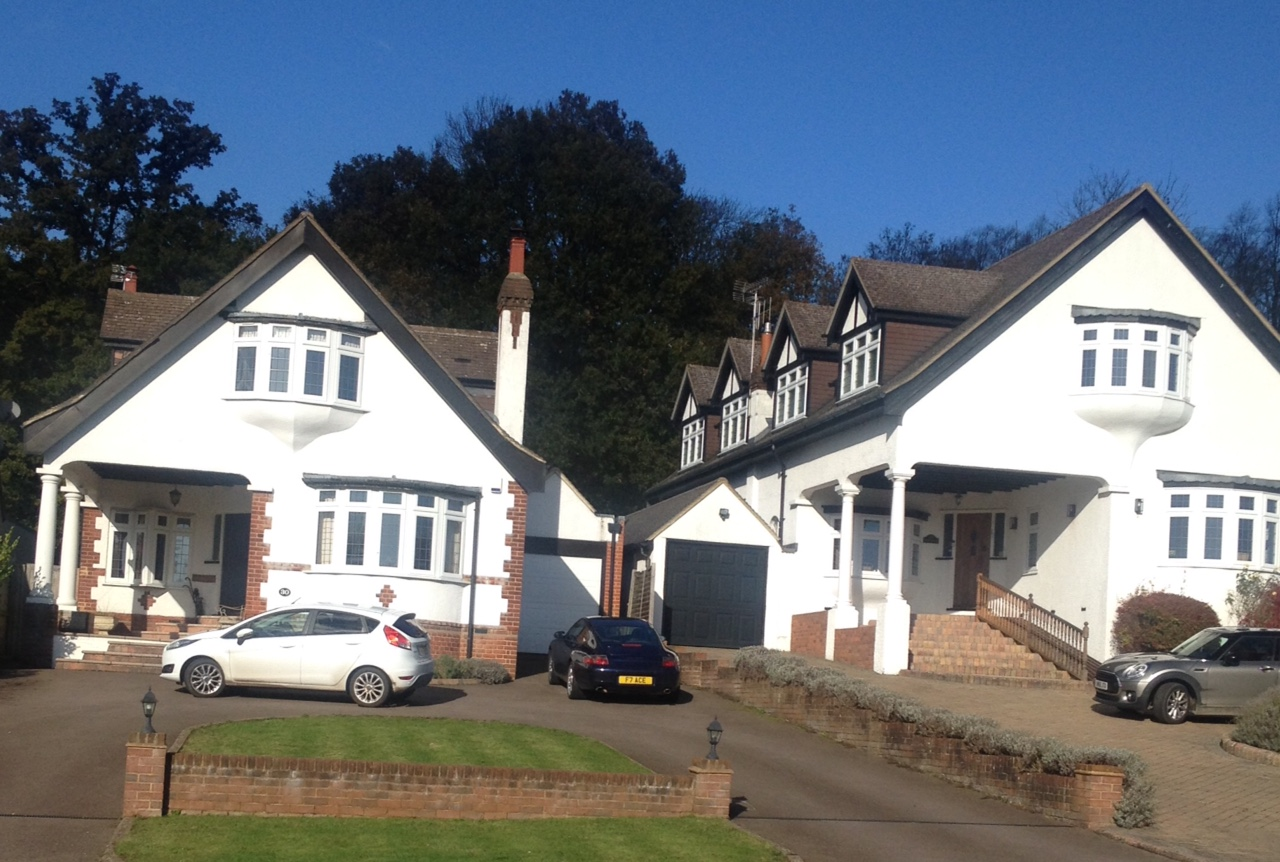
Bungalettes in Georges Wood Road

Householders protested against the building of bungalows, in Georges Wood Road and Pine Grove, as they would depreciate the value of their properties. The compromise was the 'Bungalette' with a veranda style front porch supported by Tuscan columns, which can be seen in Georges Wood Road today. In 1946 150 houses and 50 smaller dwellings (bungalows) were approved for Westlands Drive and Peplins Way. This continued with another 100 between 1947 and 1950 in Peplins Way, Westland Drive, Oaklands Avenue and the Bluebridge area, to make the residential village we know today.

Brookmans Park Primary School was built as the village grew opening in 1951 for the first 110 pupils.

=== Second World War ===
The London Blitz resulted in children being evacuated to Brookmans Park.

In 1940 the first 1000lb bomb was dropped on Queenswood’s hockey field in Shepherd’s Way.

Brookmans Park was on the Outer London Defence Ring. These defences included spigot mortar emplacements near the Brookmans Park transmitting station and one together with tank traps protecting the Station Road railway bridge.

British Foreign Secretary, Anthony Eden, on 21 May 1942 stood on Brookmans Park Station Platform to welcome his Russian counterpart the Russian Peoples' Commissar for Foreign Affairs Vyacheslav Molotov and Russian delegation. They were whisked off to Chequers leading to the signing of the Anglo-Soviet Treaty of 1942.

=== Miss Muffet ===
Local legend has it that "Little Miss Muffet" of the nursery rhyme was Patience Moffat, daughter of entomologist Dr. Thomas Moffat (possibly Moffett or Moufet), who lived in the area from 1553 to 1604 on a farm. He had invited a poet over for Christmas. During his stay he overheard Miss Moffat tell her father of how she was eating her curds and whey when a spider came down from the ceiling and frightened her. The poet made an alteration to the name Miss Moffat and wrote the rhyme. However, the traceable origins of the rhyme are murky, as it did not appear in a printed version until 1805. The local connection is celebrated by the inclusion of a spider's web in the badge of Brookmans Park School.

== Public Transportation ==
Brookmans Park railway station serves the village of Brookmans Park in Hertfordshire, England. The station is located 14 miles 37 chains north of London Kings Cross on the East Coast Main Line, on the stretch between Finsbury Park and Hatfield.

The station was opened by the London and North Eastern Railway (LNER) on 19 July 1926. The station has four platforms in total, two island platforms on both sides, but only platforms 1 & 4 are used regularly, platforms 2 & 3 are only used during line disruption or engineering work. The west side serves northbound services and another island platform serving southbound services which lies to the east. The station car park parallels the island platforms to the east.

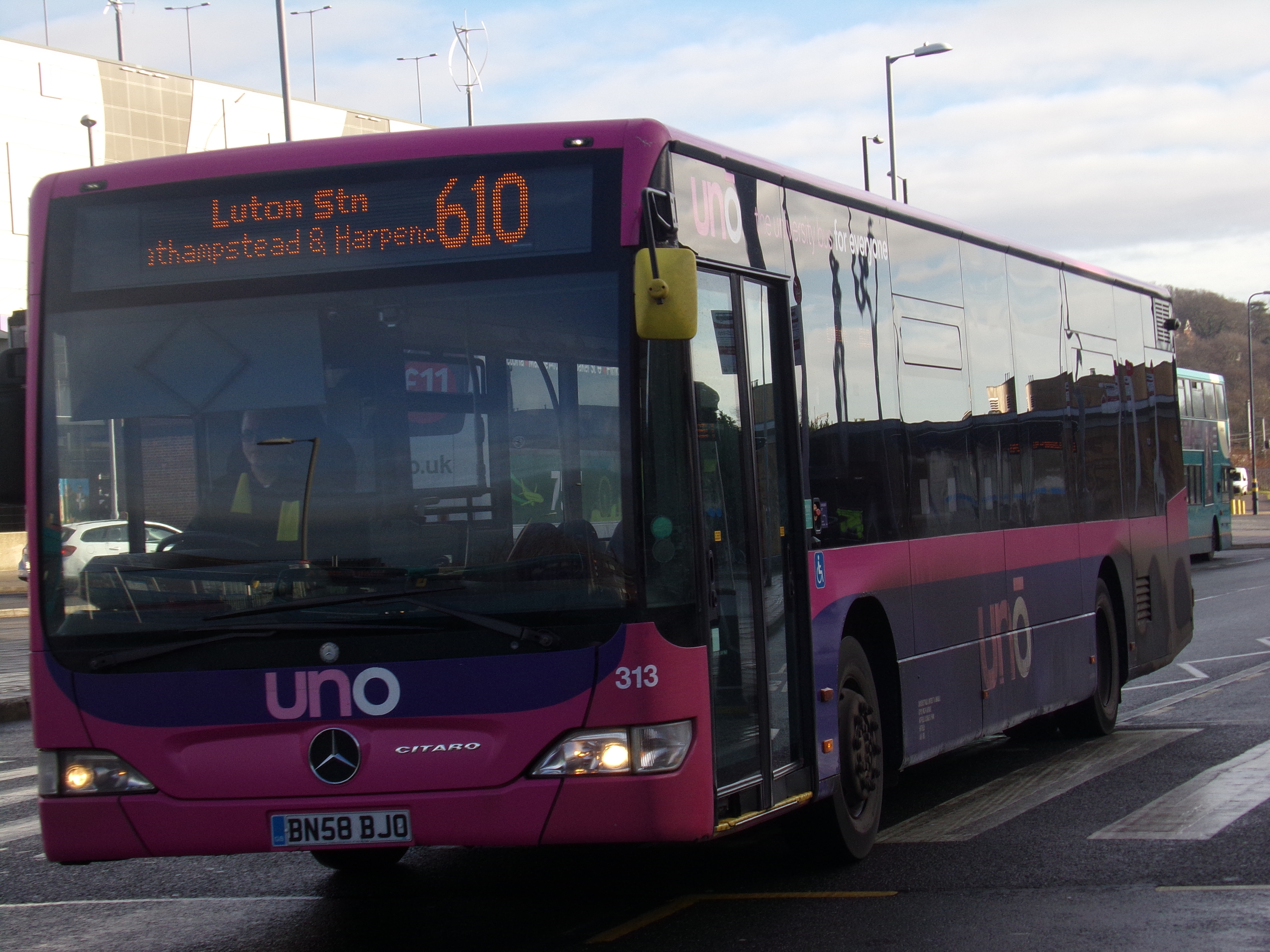
An Uno Mercedes-Benz Citaro On route 610 in December 2017

As of 2021 this station accepts contactless payment and paper tickets, but not Oyster cards. Services are operated by Great Northern to Moorgate.

There are approximately 102 trains departing from Brookmans Park station on a Typical Weekday:

- The first train departs Brookmans Park station at 04:09
- The last train departs Brookmans Park station at 00:37

The Village is also served by a number of bus routes such as the 242, 243 and 305 operated by Uno, Centrebus and Central Connect respectively.

== Brookmans Park transmitting station ==
The Brookmans Park transmitting station, is situated Northeast of Brookmans Park on the A1000 Great North Road between Potters Bar and Hatfield in Hertfordshire. The transmitter played a crucial part in the history of broadcasting in Great Britain, as the first purpose-built twin transmitter station in the world capable of broadcasting two radio programmes simultaneously when it was completed in October 1929.

It also played a part in the early development of television broadcasting. On 30 March 1930, experimental television tests were made there using thirty-line pictures. These constituted the first public transmission of simultaneous sound and vision in Great Britain. The station transmitted television broadcasts, during hours when BBC radio was off the air, until 1935.

The tower has twice blown down, and according to villagers' reports: it interferes with TV and radio transmissions; causes automatic garage doors to open of their own accord and causes radiators, telephones, toasters and waste bins to "play music".

It can interfere with DSL broadband modems, and an additional RF (radio-frequency) filter needs to be placed in the incoming line of houses near the transmitter to avoid high error rates.

Brookmans Park is also home to a VOR beacon, used by airliners arriving and departing London airspace, and affectionately known by pilots and air traffic controllers as 'The Park'.

== Brookmans Park School and Chancellor's School ==
Brookmans Park has a primary school, Brookmans Park School, and secondary school, Chancellor's School.

Brookmans Park School, opened in 1952, situated in Bradmore Way in the village of Brookmans Park. The school itself has a large playing field. In the late 1950s the PTA raised enough money at Village Day to build an open air swimming pool, in the school grounds, where the school children learn to swim and pass distance swimming certificates. This pool has now been filled in.

Nearly twenty years after the Education Act was passed in 1944 and thirteen years after the site was first designated in 1950 the search and purchase were completed. The sense of the urgent need for the school can be seen from the fact that in less than eighteen months the first pupils would cross the threshold of Chancellor's School and turn the plan for a secondary school for the children of the villages in the area into reality.

== The Brookmans ==
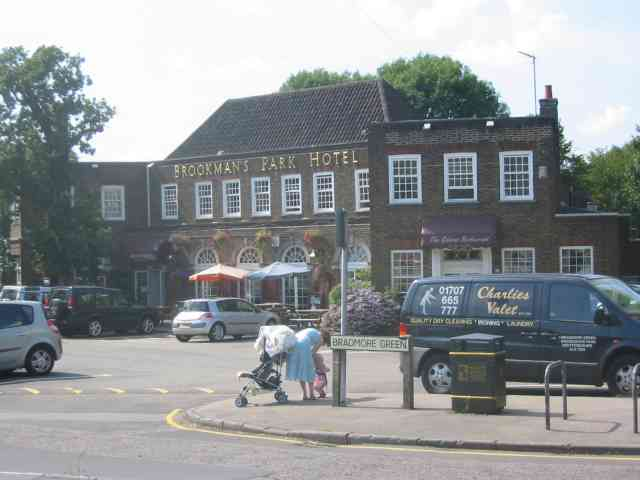
Brookmans Park Hotel

The Brookmans Park Hotel was a privately owned hotel situated in the centre of the village, with a pub and restaurant popular with local residents. The hotel was built in the 1930s in a Mason's style with high pitched ceilings, skylights, wood panelling, carved Mason symbols and a large stone fireplace. The hotel was often used for wedding banquets and other local functions. It had six hotel rooms available to guests, making it the only hotel in the area. Martin Chivers ran the Brookmans Hotel from 1983 to 1996.

The Brookmans Park Hotel was taken over by a national brewery chain in July 2006. After extensive refurbishments it reopened in April 2007 as The Brookmans pub and restaurant. The restaurant section was expanded by knocking down the wall between the main bar and old function room; and was noticeably more upmarket than The Brookmans Park Hotel had been. Along with dropping 'Hotel' from its name, the hotel business was closed and a deli business, Oaks Deli, took over what used to be the pool room in the old public house. Prior to having been a pool room, it was a wine bar called "Oaks", perhaps explaining the naming. In summer 2011 The Brookmans was taken over by Peach Pubs and after a refurbishment and menu overhaul reopened in October of the same year.

== Brookmans Park Golf Club and Lawn Tennis Club ==
Brookmans Park Golf Club is adjacent to Chancellor's School, just off Brookmans Avenue. It is a popular golf club for local players, possessing a full 18-hole course, deemed quite challenging by players locally.

The Brookmans Park Lawn Tennis Club, on Golf Club Road, is another popular sporting facility for local players. It possesses four floodlit artificial grass courts, and two macadam courts. It regularly participates in local and regional tournaments.

== Churches ==
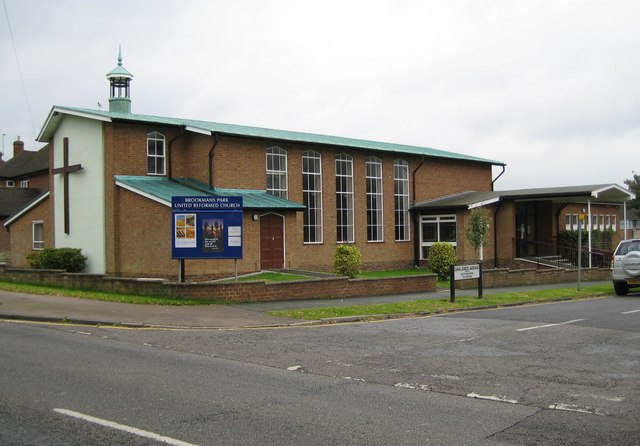
Brookmans Park United Reformed Church

Brookmans Park is in the Church of England Parish of North Mymms, served by St Mary's Church in North Mimms Park. In 1948 the squash court in (now No 48) Moffats Lane became a chapel - St. Michael and All Angels.

It is served by the Roman Catholic parish of Hatfield which has a Chapel of Ease (St Thomas More) in the neighbouring village of Welham Green.

After meeting in a shop from 1942, a hut was built in Oaklands Avenue to house the Congregational Church congregation in 1948 which is now the car park of the current United Reformed Church that replaced it in 1960.

== Notable residents ==
=== Music and dance ===
- Tracey Thorn (born 1962) Everything but the Girl singer and songwriter was born in Brookmans Park.

=== Politics, nobility and royalty ===
- Grant Shapps (born 1968) ex-Conservative MP for Welwyn Hatfield lives in Brookmans Park.
- John Somers, 1st Baron Somers (1651-1716) Whig politician spent his later years in Brookmans Park.

=== Sports ===
- Martin Chivers (1945 – 2026) Spurs footballer retired to Brookmans Park, running the Brookmans Park Hotel for 13 years (1983 -1996)
- Michael Perham (born 1992) youngest person to sail around the world singlehanded in 2009 attended Chancellor's School.
- Bukayo Saka (born 2001) Arsenal Footballer who played in the Euro 2020 tournament for the England National Team

== See also ==
- Queenswood School
- Rhodes Wood Hospital
- Royal Veterinary College
