= WMG =

WMG may refer to:

- Warner Music Group, American multinational entertainment and record label conglomerate
- Wasserman Media Group, American marketing and talent management company
- WMG, University of Warwick (formerly Warwick Manufacturing Group), United Kingdom
- Washington Marine Group, former name of the Canadian company Seaspan ULC
- Wave Motion Gun, in the science fiction anime series Space Battleship Yamato
- Welham Green railway station (National Rail station code), Hertfordshire, England
