= Hertfordshire bus route 84 =

Bus route in Hertfordshire

84
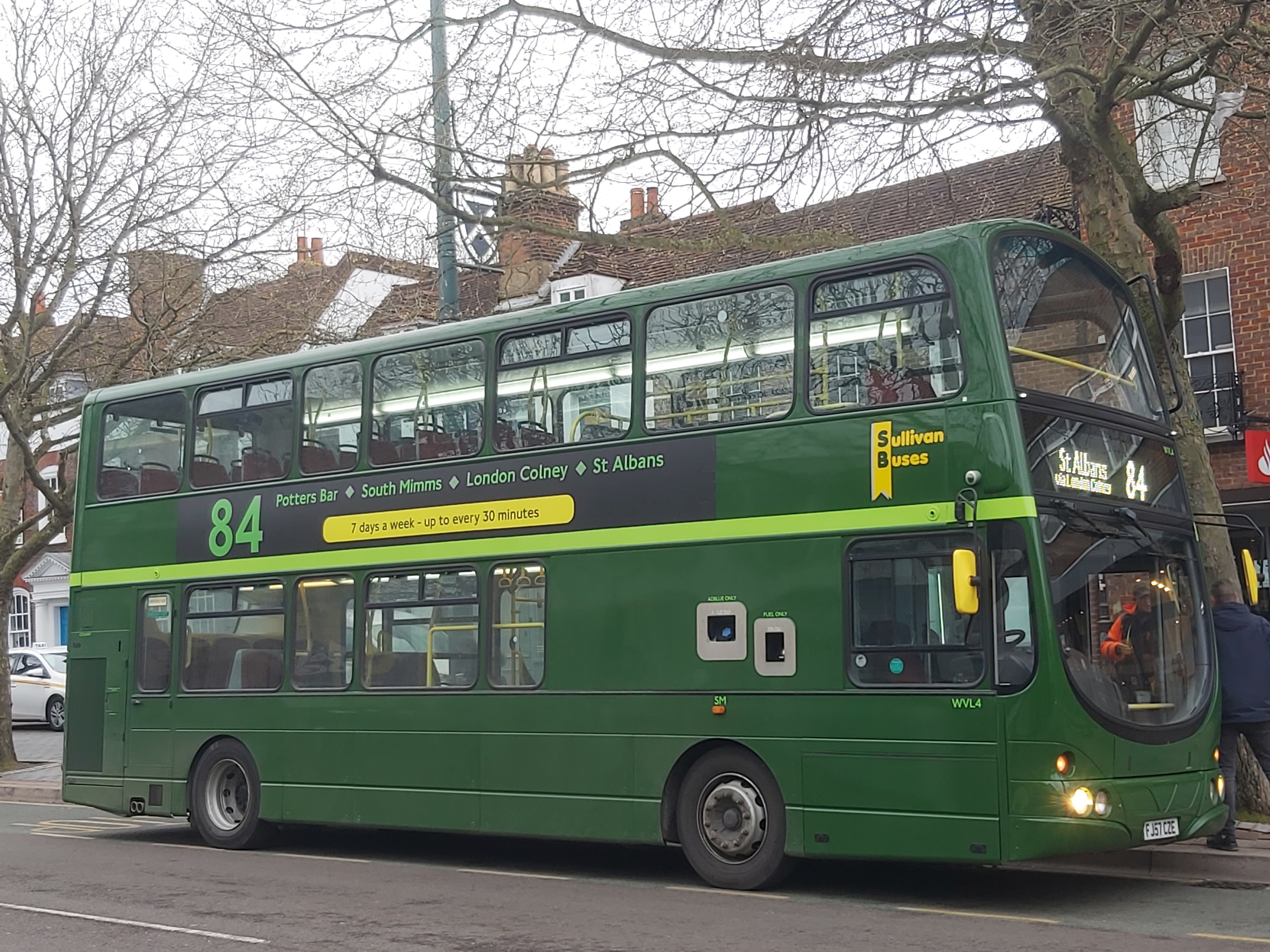
- Sullivan Buses Wright Eclipse Gemini bodied Volvo B9TL in St Albans in April 2022

Overview
- Operator: Sullivan Buses
- Garage: North Mymms
- Began service: 3 August 1912
- Former operators: London Country Bus Services; London Regional Transport; London General Omnibus Company; Metroline

Route
- Start: St Albans
- Via: London Colney; South Mimms
- End: Potters Bar station

Hertfordshire bus route 84 is a commercial bus service running in Hertfordshire. Running between St Albans and Potters Bar station, it is operated by Sullivan Buses.

== History ==
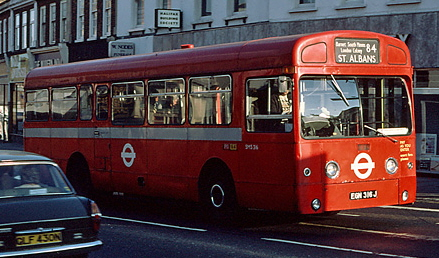
AEC Swift in High Barnet in July 1980

Route 84 commenced operating on 3 August 1912 between St Albans and Golders Green. It was operated by the London General Omnibus Company as a feeder service to the Charing Cross, Euston & Hampstead Railway which at that time terminated at Golders Green.

Route 84 used to reach further into London: in 1936 it ran from St Albans to Golders Green, albeit omitting Potters Bar itself by running via New Road. As a wartime economy, from May 1940, route 84 was withdrawn south of Whetstone, being diverted to Arnos Grove station instead. In August 1969 it was cut back to Barnet and diverted to New Barnet station. Operation of the route passed from London Regional Transport to London Country Bus Services in 1982. In 1986 it reverted to being a London Transport operated route.

From 2 January 2012, the route no longer accepted Transport for London tickets as the partial subsidy from Transport for London was withdrawn.

In February 2022, Metroline announced that it intended to withdraw the route in April that year. However, after a petition of over 6000 and local protests, Sullivan Buses declared that they would operate a new route between Potters Bar and St Albans with financial support from Hertfordshire County Council. The route number was subsequently confirmed to be remaining the same, although with the Potters Bar to Barnet section withdrawn.

On 2 April 2022, Sullivan Buses took over the route, running a half-hourly service on Mondays to Saturdays and an hourly service on Sundays and public holidays.

In Summer 2023, after other campaigns, a new Monday-Saturday bus route was confirmed to restore the section between Potters Bar and Barnet, running between Potters Bar railway station and Barnet Hospital via Potters Bar Community Hospital and Chipping Barnet. It commenced operations in early September 2023 and was numbered 84B. It was run by a bus company based near Bishop's Stortford called Central Connect. Oyster was not valid on this service. Route 84B was later renumbered 243 and transferred operations to Uno. It was also extended to Hatfield with the revamped service commencing from 1 September 2025.

== Route ==
Route 84 operates via these primary locations:

- St Albans St Peter's Street
- St Albans City station
- London Colney
- South Mimms
- Potters Bar station
