= Standon =

Standon could be:

- Standon, Hampshire
- Standon, Hertfordshire
- Standon, Staffordshire
- Standon Green End, Hertfordshire

== See also ==
- Standen
