= BPK =

BPK may refer to:

- Brookmans Park railway station, Hertfordshire, National Rail station code
- Bruton's tyrosine kinase
- Audit Board of Indonesia (Indonesian: Badan Pemeriksa Keuangan), Indonesian government body responsible for evaluation and accountability of state finances
