= Chancellor's School =

Location
- Pine Grove; Brookmans Park, Hertfordshire, AL9 7BN; England; 51°43′39″N 0°11′01″W

Information
- Type: Academy
- Motto: Achieve. Enjoy. Excel.
- Religious affiliation: None
- Established: 1964
- Local authority: Hertfordshire
- Department for Education URN: 147246 Tables
- Ofsted: Reports
- Head teacher: Megan Hubbard
- Gender: Coeducational
- Age: 11 to 18
- Enrolment: 1,147
- Colour: Sky Blue
- Website: https://www.chancellors.herts.sch.uk/

Chancellor's School is a coeducational secondary school and sixth form located in Brookmans Park, Hertfordshire, England.

== History ==
The school opened in 1964, marking the end of a campaign by parents and local residents for the village to have its own secondary school. The school was named after Thomas More, though the education authority that named the school, Hertfordshire County Council, mistakenly believed that More previously occupied part of the land on which the school was built. Lilian Caras's book, Chancellor's School - The Background, sets out the circumstances leading up to the building of the school and charts its development. The school became a specialist in mathematics and ICT 2006 with its continued investment in these areas.

Chancellor's School's GCSE standards continued to rise up until 2003-2004 when it reached its record of over 73% of pupils passed GCSE with at least 5 Cs.

Previously a foundation school administered by Hertfordshire County Council, in July 2019 Chancellor's School converted to academy status. The school is now sponsored by the Danes Educational Trust.

== Houses ==
The house system was re-introduced in 2012 and made up of six houses, all named after Lord Chancellors: Arundel, Becket, Hailsham, More, Somers and Wolsey. In 2019, Yorke house was added.

House	House Colour
Arundel	Purple
Becket	Orange
Hailsham	Blue
More	Red
Somers	Yellow
Wolsey	Green
Yorke	Light Blue
