= Francesco d'Aquino, Prince of Caramanico =

Italian politician

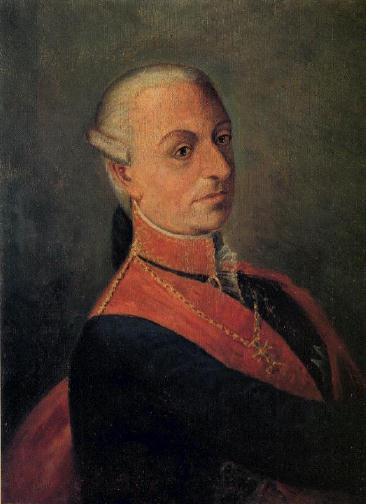
Francesco d"Aquino (artist unknown)

Francesco Maria Venanzio d'Aquino, prince of Caramanico (27 February 1738, Naples - 9 January 1795, Palermo) was ambassador to London and Paris for the Kingdom of Naples and later viceroy of Sicily.

== Life ==
=== Family ===
He was the son of prince Antonio and of Ippolita Pignatelli, his mother being from the line of princes of Monteroduni. In 1767 he married Vittoria de Guevara, from the family of the dukes of Bovino - she was the widow of Carlo Carafa, duke of Maddaloni. On his father's death in 1775, Francesco succeeded to the titles prince of Caramanico, duke of Casoli, marquess (marchese) of Francolise and count (conte) of Palena. Francesco had a brother, Luigi d'Aquino, who was an associate of Cagliostro.

=== Early career ===
A supporter of Freemasonry in Naples, in 1769 he was elected Grand Master of the 'loggia della Vittoria' (Victory Lodge). In 1776 Bernardo Tanucci had several supporters of Freemasonry arrested to thwart an attempt by them and the queen Maria Carolina of Austria to withdraw Naples from the Spanish sphere of influence. However, Albert Casimir, Duke of Teschen and Louise Marie Adélaïde de Bourbon came to Naples to support the queen and the Freemasons, strengthening the queen's bond with Caramanico and causing the fall of Tanucci.

Caramanico was appointed Naples' ambassador to London in 1780, taking the future aeronaut Vincenzo Lunardi there as his secretary. Whilst in London, Caramanico was made a Fellow of the Royal Society. In 1784 he was moved to Paris to be Naples' ambassador to France, a post he held until 1786. On his return to Naples, he was awarded the insignia of the Order of Saint Januarius and made a member of the Council of State.

=== Viceroy ===
In 1786 he was made viceroy of Sicily, replacing Domenico Caracciolo - it was probably Sir John Acton who favoured his appointment, in order to get him out of Naples, where he was very popular. Thanks to his powers as the king's substitute in Sicily, Caramanico continued Caracciolo's work of reform, limiting the barons' power and reinforcing central control. To this end, in 1788 he abolished angaria (i.e. the free benefits which serfs were duly bound to pay at their feudal lords' whim) and in 1789 he eliminated the last remnants of serfdom in the countryside. He then reduced the number of noble seats in the Deputazione del Regno and thus also reduced the nobles' power within it.

An admirer of egalitarian ideals as typified by the French Revolution, Caramanico maintained good relations with the French even after the guillotining of Louis XVI. Caramanico also reformed the university of Catania, conclusively replaced Latin with Italian as the language of all public documents and became popular among the poor for his charitable work, especially during the 1792-1793 epidemic. After a night in agony he died suddenly on 8 January 1795, perhaps having been poisoned.
