= Potters Bar railway station =

Network Rail station in Hertfordshire, England

Potters Bar
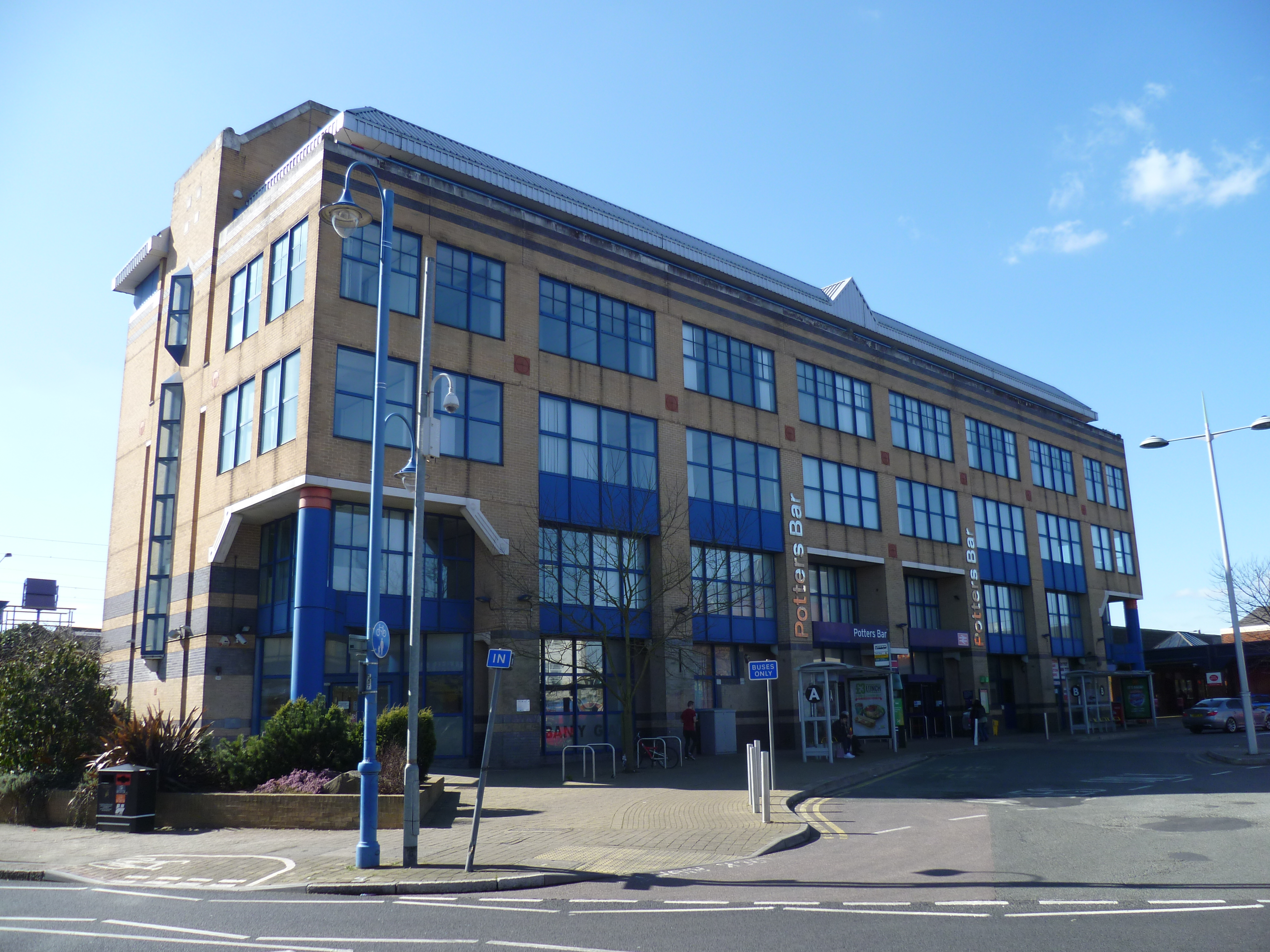
- The main entrance of the station
- Interactive map of Potters Bar

General information
- Location: Potters Bar
- Local authority: Borough of Hertsmere
- Grid reference: TL249014
- Managed by: Great Northern
- Station code: PBR
- DfT category: C2
- Number of platforms: 4
- Accessible: Yes
- Fare zone: B

National Rail annual entry and exit
- 2020–21: ▼0.562 million
- 2021–22: ▲1.417 million
- 2022–23: ▲2.073 million
- 2023–24: ▲2.379 million
- 2024–25: ▲2.486 million
- Interchange: 51,414

Railway companies
- Original company: Great Northern Railway
- Pre-grouping: Great Northern Railway
- Post-grouping: London and North Eastern Railway

Key dates
- 7 August 1850: Opened as Potter's Bar
- 1 May 1923: Renamed Potter's Bar and South Mimms
- 3 May 1971: Renamed Potter's Bar

Other information
- External links: Departures; Facilities
- Coordinates: 51.697°N 0.194°W

Potters Bar railway station serves the town of Potters Bar in Hertfordshire, England. It is located on the Great Northern route, 12 miles 57 chains (20.5 km) north of London King's Cross on the East Coast Main Line. The station is managed and served by Great Northern, with Thameslink services also calling in the peak hours.

== History ==
The first section of the Great Northern Railway (GNR) opened on 1 March 1848 in Lincolnshire between Louth and Grimsby, where it met the Manchester, Sheffield and Lincolnshire Railway. The GNR quickly expanded and soon they had finished the southern section of their main line, between Maiden Lane in London and Peterborough, which opened with Potter's Bar as one of the original stations on 7 August 1850. The station sits at the peak of the climb out of London King's Cross, and it is the highest point on the line between London and Newcastle.

On 1 January 1923, the GNR became a constituent part of the London and North Eastern Railway (LNER), which was one of the "big four" railway companies. The station was renamed Potter's Bar and South Mimms on 1 May that year; on 3 May 1971, it reverted to its original name of Potter's Bar.

The current station building, designed in a post-modern style, is the third on this site. It replaced a 1955 structure designed by James Wyatt of the Eastern Region Architect's Department (Chief Architect H Powell). Pevsner described the 1955 station as "The first of the Eastern Region's good modern stations, the style much lighter in touch than in the stations of the 1960s (cf Broxbourne). Neat brick clerestory-lit booking hall".

The platform canopies were also constructed in 1955, using what was then an innovative technique of pre-stressed concrete. As the concrete set, it unexpectedly curved up at either end of the long, thin canopies, unintentionally creating the willow look.

=== Thameslink Programme ===
In September 2016, Govia Thameslink Railway released a consultation for their May 2018 timetables, following completion of the Thameslink Programme.

It was proposed that the local Great Northern services between Moorgate and Welwyn Garden City would be increased from 3 to 4 tph with the Cambridge to London King's Cross services transferred to Thameslink and extended to Maidstone East via London Bridge. The peak hour Welwyn Garden City to London King's Cross were also to be transferred to Thameslink and extended to Sevenoaks via Catford.

In May 2018, the local Great Northern services were increased to 4 trains per hour (tph) as planned, although they have subsequently been reduced to 2 tph due to the COVID-19 pandemic. The Cambridge to London service was also transferred to Thameslink, but was not extended to Maidstone East as planned. The service was transferred back to Great Northern in May 2023.

The Welwyn Garden City to London services were transferred to Thameslink in May 2018, as planned, and were subsequently extended to Sevenoaks in May 2022.

=== Accidents and incidents ===
The station has been the site of two major train crashes:

- On 10 February 1946, a local passenger train travelling towards London King's Cross crashed into the barriers at Potters Bar station, causing debris to foul the fast lines. The debris was then hit by two express trains on the fast lines, causing two deaths and 17 injuries.
- On 10 May 2002, a northbound express train derailed whilst passing through the station, resulting in seven deaths and 76 injuries.

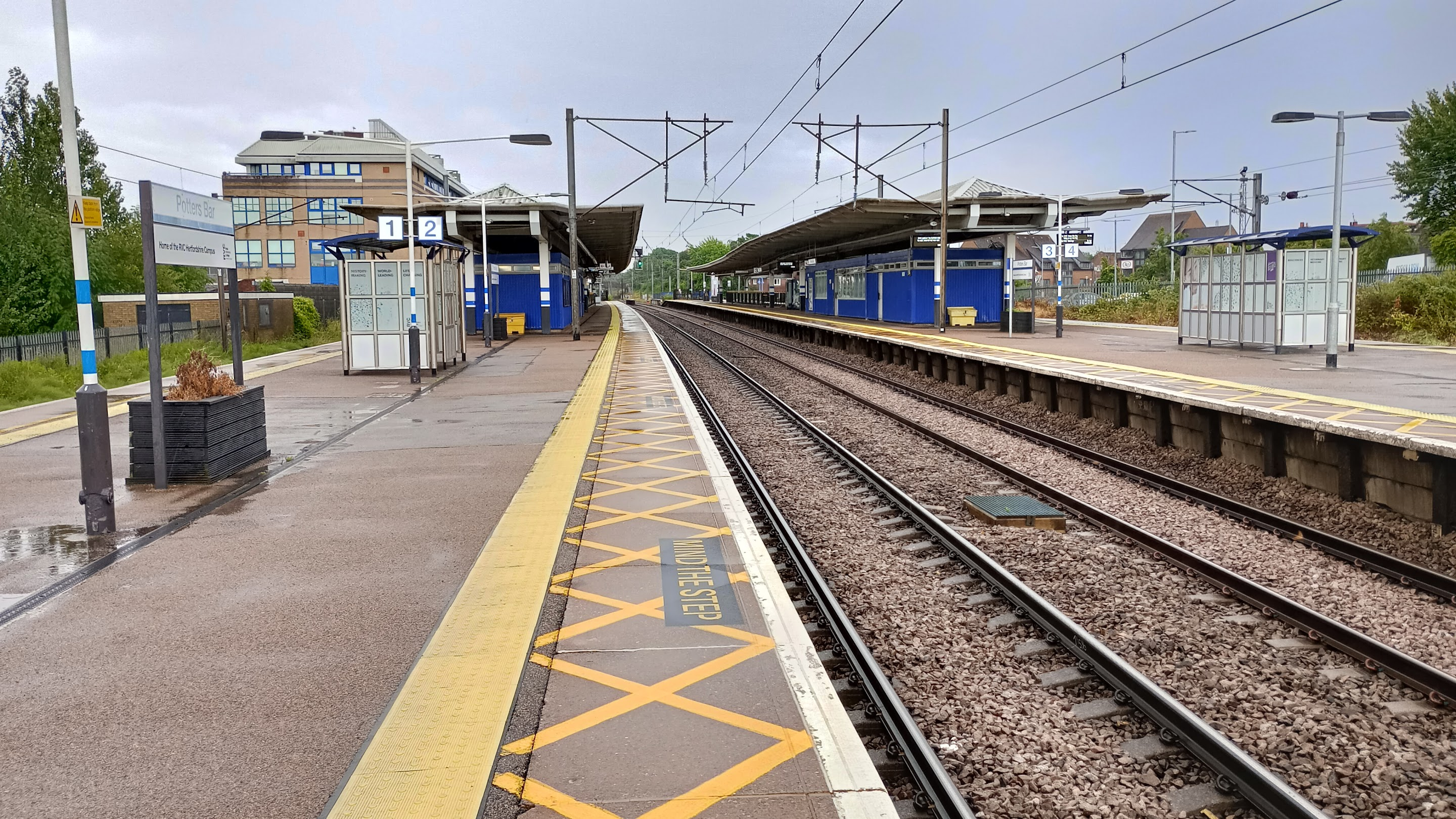
The southbound view from the end of Platform 2.

== Facilities ==
The station has a ticket office which is staffed for most of the day.

The station is on two levels:

- On the lower level are ticket machines in the booking hall and near the entrance to the car park, a photo booth, cash machine, two ticket counters and a cafe. Ramped access to the platforms is controlled by automatic ticket barriers.
- On the upper level, canopies run most of the length of both platforms. Each island platform has a help-point. Platforms 1 & 2 have toilets, a refreshment kiosk and a customer information office. Platforms 3 & 4 are home to staff facilities, including a mess room and station manager's office.

Platforms 2 & 3 are used by express services and platforms 1 & 4 are used by local services.

=== Oyster card ticketing ===
Govia Thameslink Railway agreed to extend London Zonal Fares to include Potters Bar by September 2015 when they won the Great Northern franchise. In 2016, Transport for London indicated that Welwyn Garden City and Potters Bar are two of the top four priority stations for the extension of London Zonal Fares.

The station came under Transport for London's Oyster card fare system during summer 2019.

== Services ==
All off-peak services at Potters Bar are operated by Great Northern, using Class 387 and Class 717 electric multiple units.

The typical off-peak service in trains per hour is:

- 2 tph to London King's Cross (semi-fast)
- 2 tph to Moorgate (all stations)
- 2 tph to Welwyn Garden City (all stations)
- 2 tph to Letchworth Garden City of which 1 continues to Cambridge

Additional services, including a number of Thameslink-operated services to and from Sevenoaks, via London Blackfriars and Catford, call at the station during peak hours.

Preceding station	National Rail	Following station
Hadley Wood	Great Northern Great Northern Route Stopping Services	Brookmans Park
Alexandra Palace	Great Northern Great Northern Route Semi-Fast Services	Hatfield
New Barnet	Thameslink Thameslink Peak Hours Only	Hatfield

== Connections ==
London Buses routes 298 and 313, Sullivan Buses routes 84 and 398, and Uno routes 242, 243 and PB1 serve the station.
