= Welham Green =

Village in Hertfordshire, England

Coordinates: 51.73468°N 0.21732°W

- Location within Hertfordshire
- Population: 3,639 (2001 Census); 3,741 (2011 Census.Ward)
- OS grid reference: TL232055
- District: Welwyn Hatfield
- Shire county: Hertfordshire
- Region: East
- Country: England
- Sovereign state: United Kingdom
- Post town: HATFIELD
- Postcode district: AL9
- Dialling code: 01707
- Police: Hertfordshire
- Fire: Hertfordshire
- Ambulance: East of England
- UK Parliament: Welwyn Hatfield

Welham Green is a village in the parish of North Mymms, Hertfordshire, England. It is situated a mile to the west of the Great North Road coaching route that used to run through the neighbouring hamlet of Bell Bar from London to York and the north. The Great North Road has since been replaced as the main artery by the A1(M). Even so, Welham Green has developed into a small village over the last 100 years, helped by the 1986 opening of its own railway station between Brookmans Park and Hatfield on the East Coast Main Line. Recent housing development has portended the joining of the village with the neighbouring town of Hatfield. Some residents, including the North Mymms Green Belt Society, wishing to maintain Welham Green's character, have resisted such development.

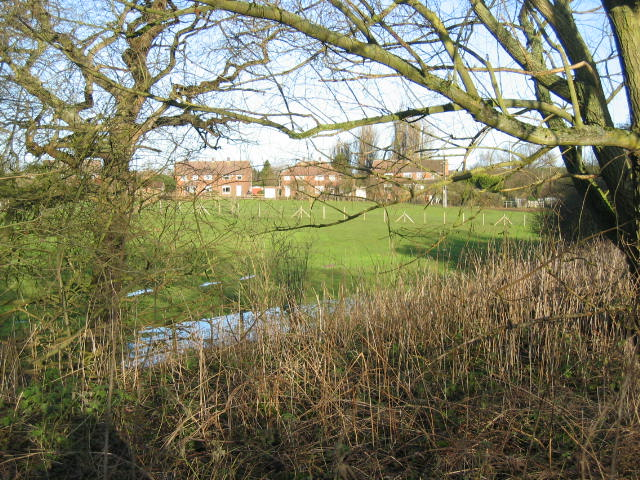
Welham Green from the East Coast Main Line

== First balloon landing in England ==
In the village, on the corner of Huggins Lane and Parsonage Lane, is a stone plinth marking the brief landing at 3.30pm on 15 September 1784, of the Italian balloonist Vincenzo Lunardi. The actual spot where the first hydrogen filled balloon flight over England touched down is almost three miles away opposite Queenswood School north of Shepherds Way (B157) to the south-east of Brookmans Park. The plinth states that on landing Lunardi handed to a local resident a cat and a dog that had accompanied him from London, before re-ascending and continuing north east. According to witness statements at the time, the cat, which had become ill, was cared for by a local girl who had been working in the cornfield where the balloon touched down.

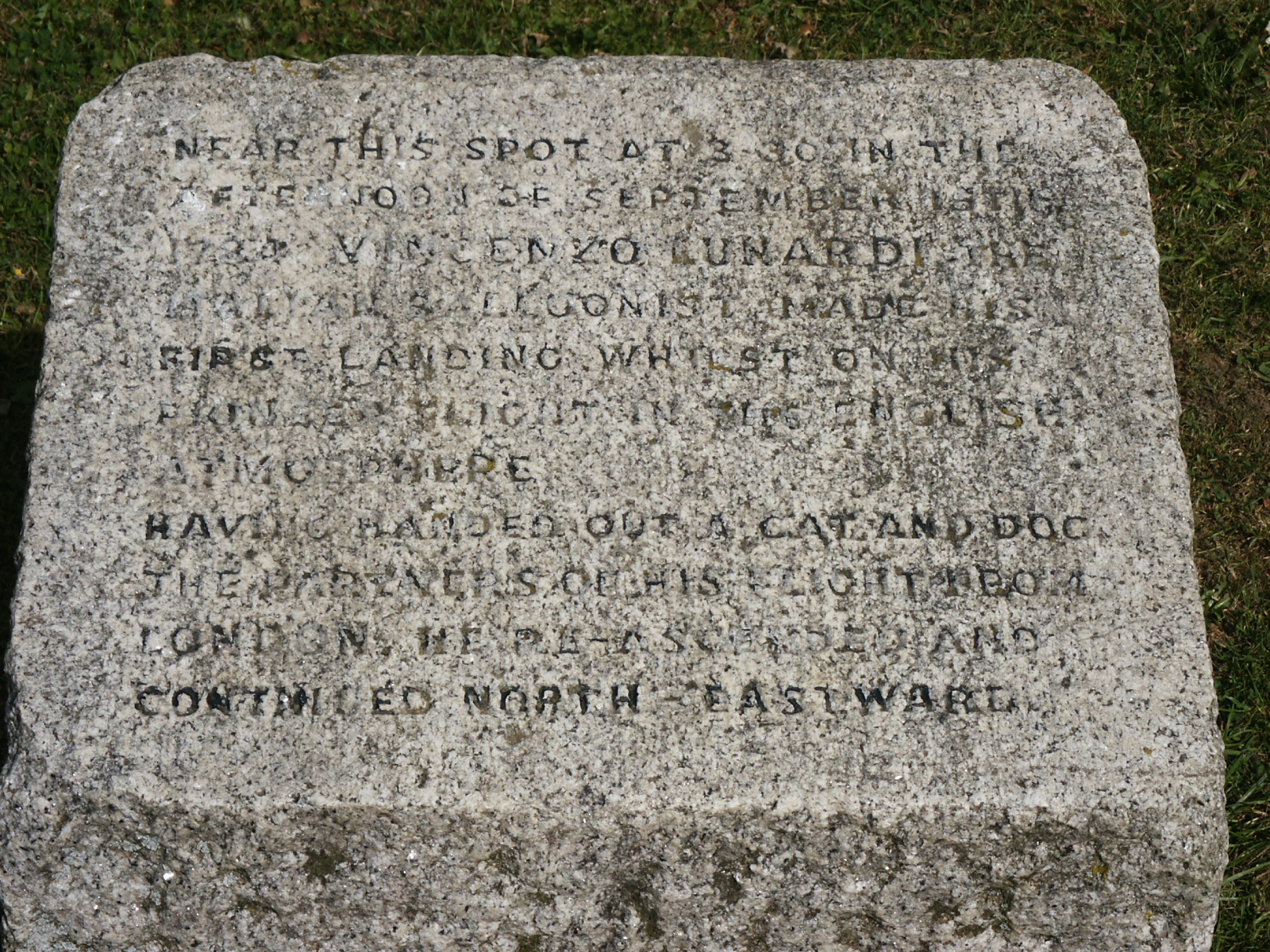
The Plinth marker for the first hydrogen balloon flight in England. September 15th 1784

The plinth reads:

Near this spot at 3.30 in the afternoon of September 15, 1784 Vincenzo Lunardi the Italian Balloonist made his first landing whilst on his pioneer flight in the English atmosphere. Having handed out a cat and dog the partners of his flight from London he re-ascended and continued North Eastward.

== Public transport ==
The village is served by Welham Green railway station and local bus services such as 242, 243 and 305 provided by Uno, Centrebus and Central Connect.
