= Sullivan Buses =

British bus operating company

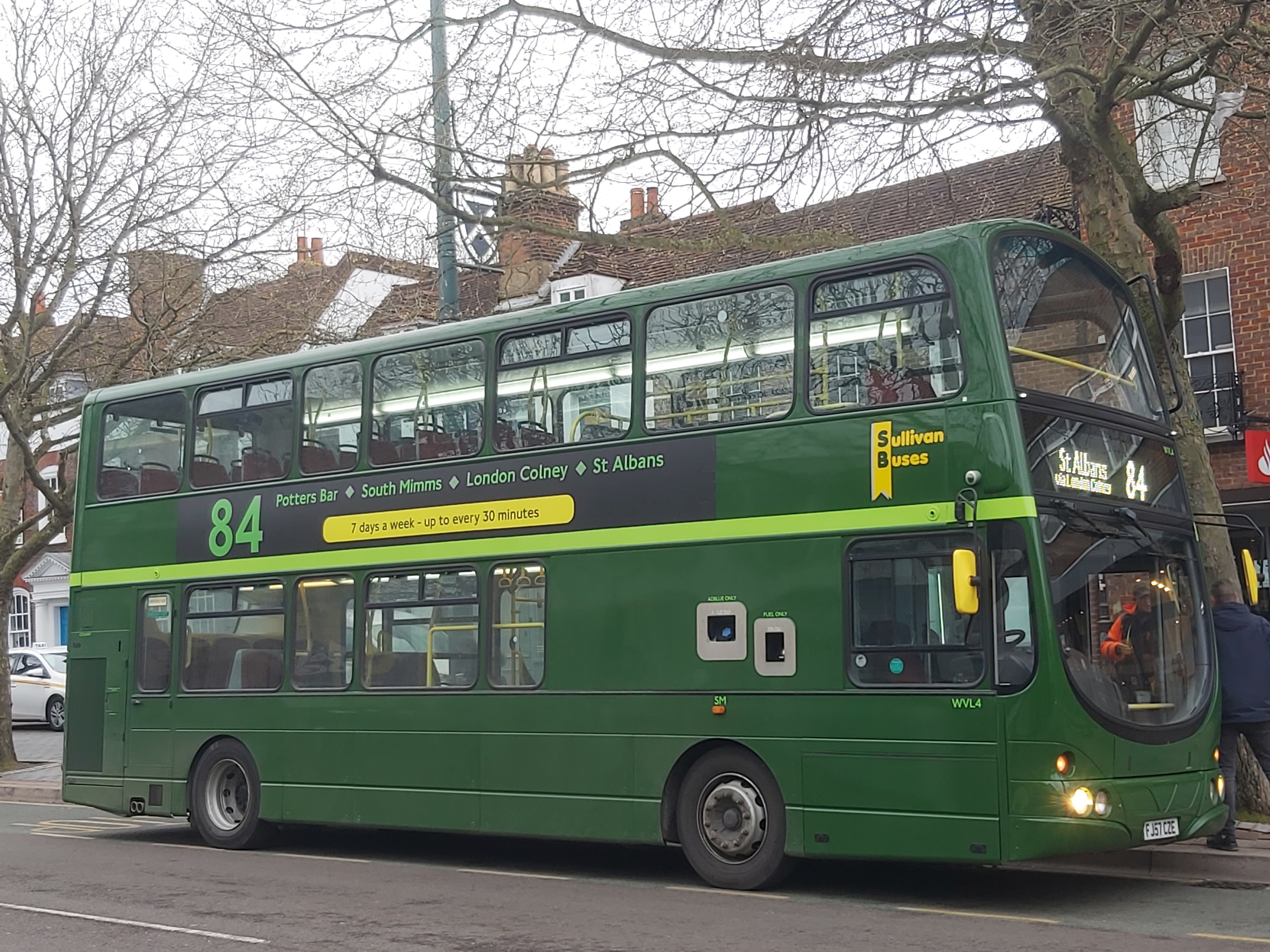
- Wright Eclipse Gemini bodied Volvo B9TL on route 84 in 2022
- Founded: 1998
- Headquarters: North Mymms
- Service area: Hertfordshire; Surrey
- Service type: Bus services
- Routes: 17
- Depots: North Mymms; Thorpe Park
- Fleet: 35 (August 2026)
- Chief executive: Dean Sullivan
- Website: www.sullivanbuses.com

Sullivan Buses Engineering Limited, trading as Sullivan Buses, is a bus company based in North Mymms, Hertfordshire, England. Founded in 1998, it operates local bus services in and around Hertfordshire including school services, rail replacement bus services near London, bus links in Surrey to and from Thorpe Park and vehicle hire for television programmes.

== History ==
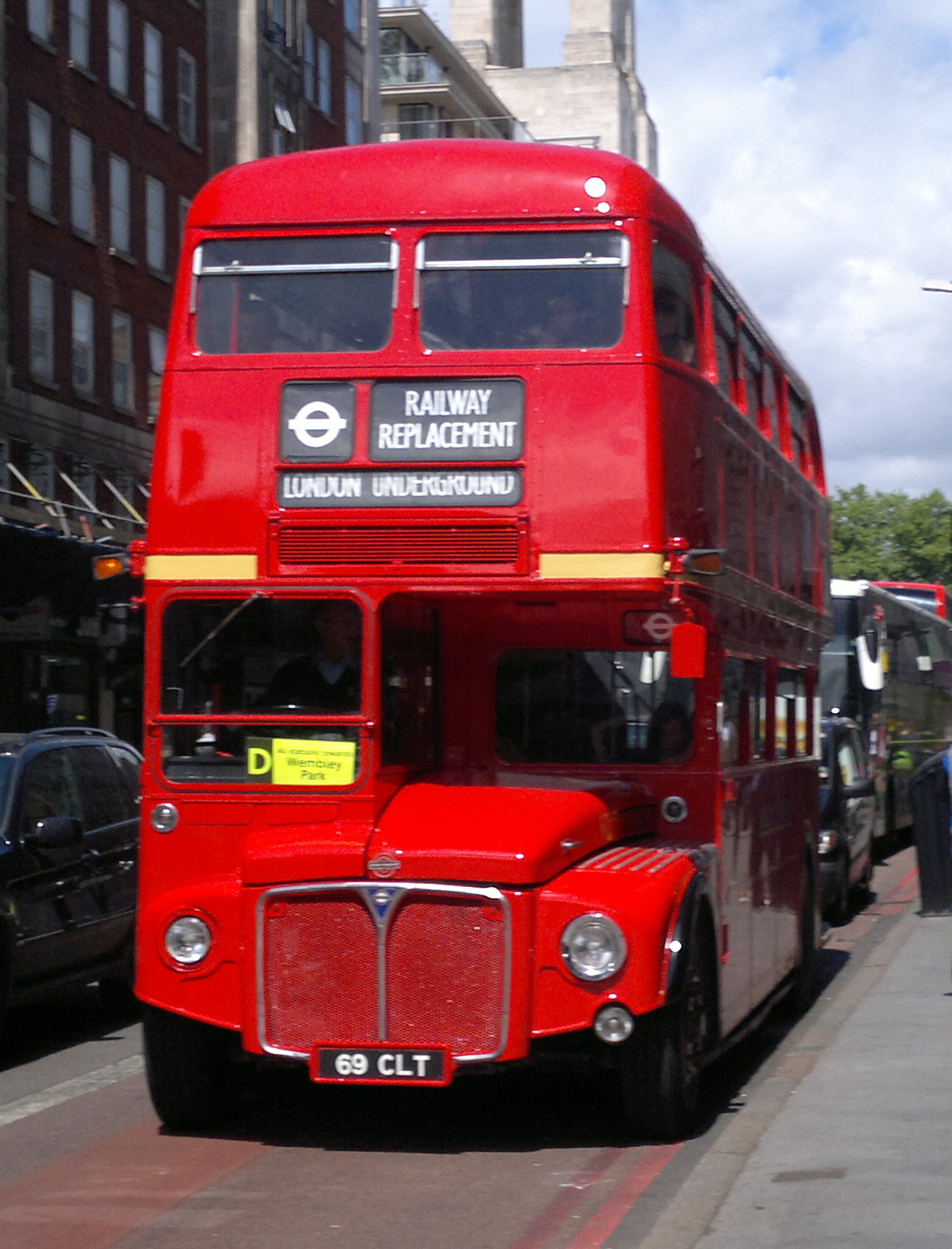
AEC Routemaster on a London Underground replacement service at Baker Street station in May 2011

Sullivan Buses was founded in 1998 by former London Underground manager Dean Sullivan.

Sullivan Buses operates public and school bus routes predominantly in Hertfordshire and previously operated routes in North London. Rail replacement work, particularly on the London Underground, is also operated. In 2004, this work contributed to two-thirds of the company's turnover of £3 million. Sullivan Buses vehicles frequently appear in film and television broadcasts and advertisements, partially because of the company location's proximity to the Elstree Studios. By August 2007, 20 different buses had been used in over 30 productions.

In January 2005, Sullivan Buses purchased Southlands Travel, located at Pollhill in Kent, but this operation ceased in February 2007, with some of the routes passing to Griffin Bus, who operated initially from Pollhill before moving to Longfield. In May 2011 Griffin Bus ceased operations and their routes were transferred over to other operators.

Due to increased traffic congestion, Hertfordshire County Council-controlled route B3 was revised with additional running time and made significant changes to timings to meet train arrivals and departures from July 2012. Starting from September 2012, Sullivan Buses won TfL tenders for school routes 628, 653, 683 and 688 from Arriva London. This came after the company also won the tender for route 298.

Sullivan Buses won the TfL tender on route W9 and retained route 298 in 2016, both acquiring brand-new Alexander Dennis Enviro200 MMC buses as a result.

From 1 September 2018, Sullivan Buses axed a section of commercial route 398 between Watford and Borehamwood. To minimise inconvenience, route 306 improved its evening frequencies to every 15 minutes.

In May 2021, it was announced Sullivan Buses would take over the TfL tender for route 549 from 12 March 2022.

In February 2022, Sullivan Buses announced the takeover of route 84 between Potters Bar and St Albans, following Metroline's decision to withdraw from the route. The effects took place on 2 April 2022.

In August 2024, Sullivan Buses announced that they would be ceasing operation of their 12 London routes, citing financial issues and penalties imposed by TfL as reasons. South Mimms depot will also be closed with all non-TfL routes being transferred.

== Garages ==
Sullivan Buses operates two bus garages.

=== North Mymms ===
North Mymms garage operates routes 84, 303, 306, 306A, 330, 331, 346, 347, 354, 355, 356, 358, 397, 398, 832, 833 and 951.

=== Thorpe Park ===
Thorpe Park garage operates route 950.

== Former garage ==
=== South Mimms (SM) ===
South Mimms garage operated routes 84, 303, 306, 306A, 330, 331, 346, 347, 354, 355, 356, 358, 397, 398, 832, 833 and 951. South Mimms garage also operated Transport for London-contracted routes 217, 298, 299, 327, 389, 399, 549, 605, 606, 617, 629, 640 and W9. This garage closed in August 2024 due to the cessation of Sullivan Buses' operations in London.

== Fleet ==
The fleet initially was built up with ex Transport for London Leyland Olympians, Leyland Titans, MCW Metrobuses and Volvo Olympians. As at November 2020, the fleet consisted of 111 buses, including an AEC Routemaster heritage vehicle and a driver training vehicle. The fleet dedicated to Transport for London operations consisted of 74 buses as at March 2023. By 2026, after the repossession of nearly all of their TfL service buses in 2024, the fleet has reduced to 35 buses as of August 2026.
