= Letitia Ann Sage =

First British woman to fly in a balloon

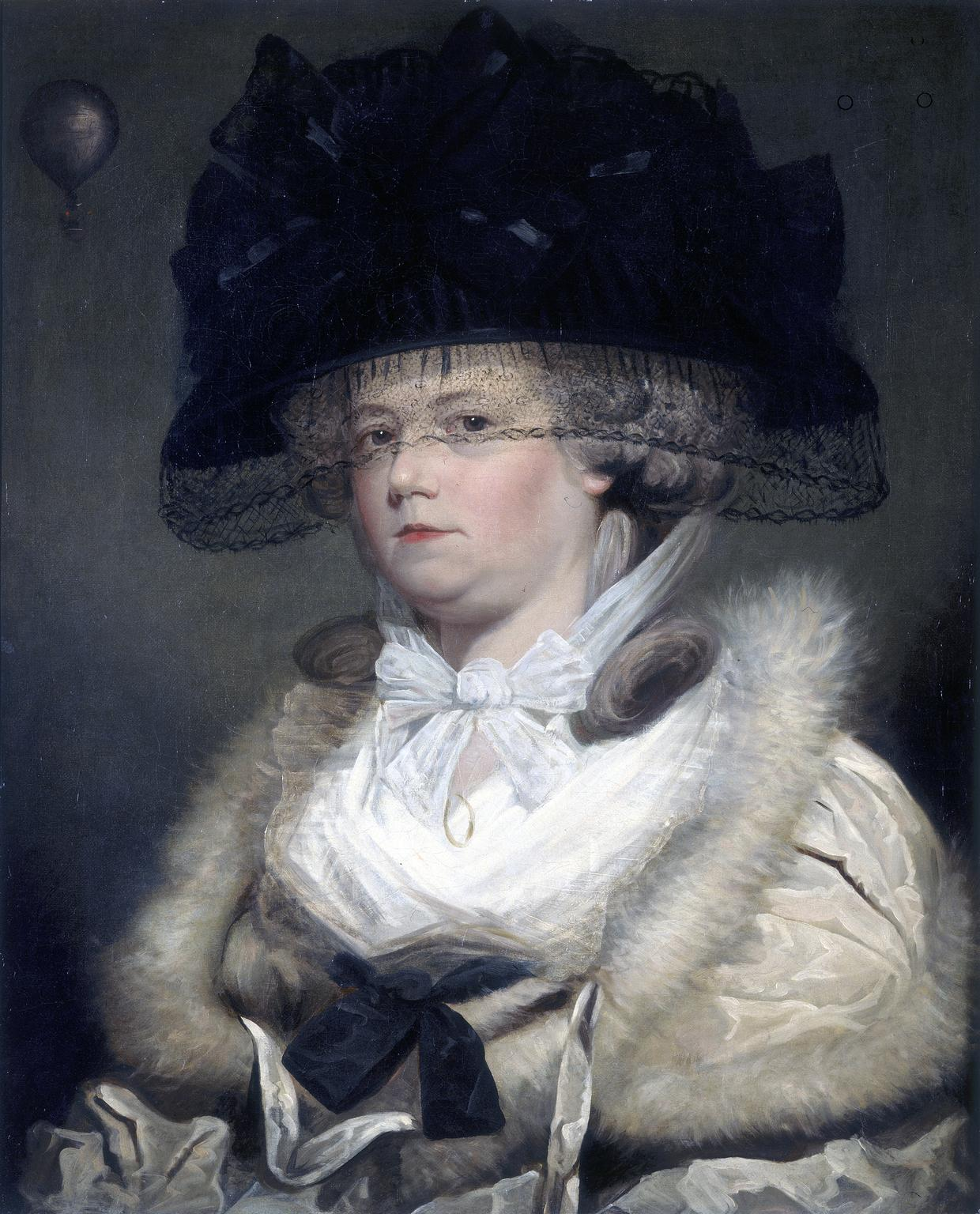
- Born: Letitia Ann Hoare ca.1750 England
- Died: after 1817; England
- Known for: First British woman aeronaut

Letitia Ann Sage (née Hoare; c.1750–after 1817) was the first British woman to fly, making her ascent on 29 June 1785, in a balloon launched by Vincenzo Lunardi (an Italian aeronaut) from St George's Fields in London. She was also an actress and a writer.

== Background ==
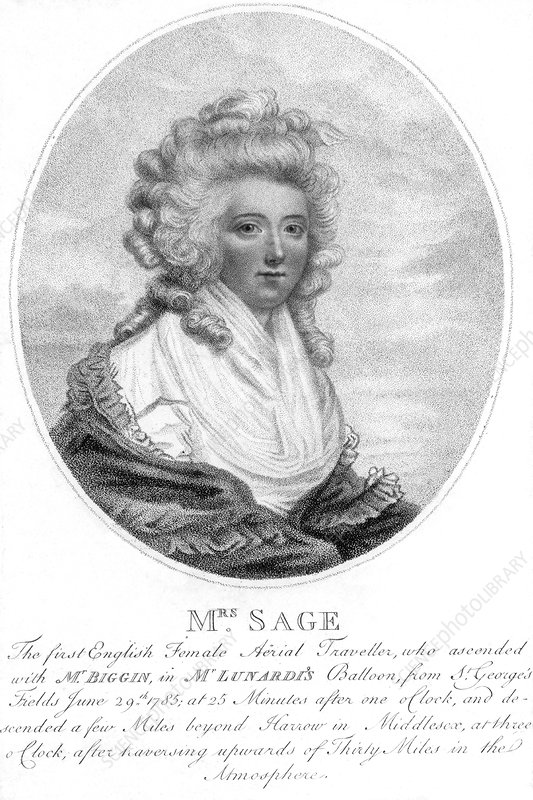
Letitia Ann Sage, 1785, engraving by Thomas Burke

She is thought to have been an actress and to have appeared at Covent Garden in 1773, and at some point lived with a haberdasher whose name she took, calling herself Mrs Sage. She is known to have resided for a time at No. 10 Charles Street, Covent Garden. She had two sisters, who were actresses: Mrs Sarah Ward (c.1753-1838) and Mrs Kate Powell (c.1762-1807). Sarah was the wife of Thomas Ward, manager of the Manchester Theatre, whilst Kate's husband was Sparks Powell.

== The flight ==
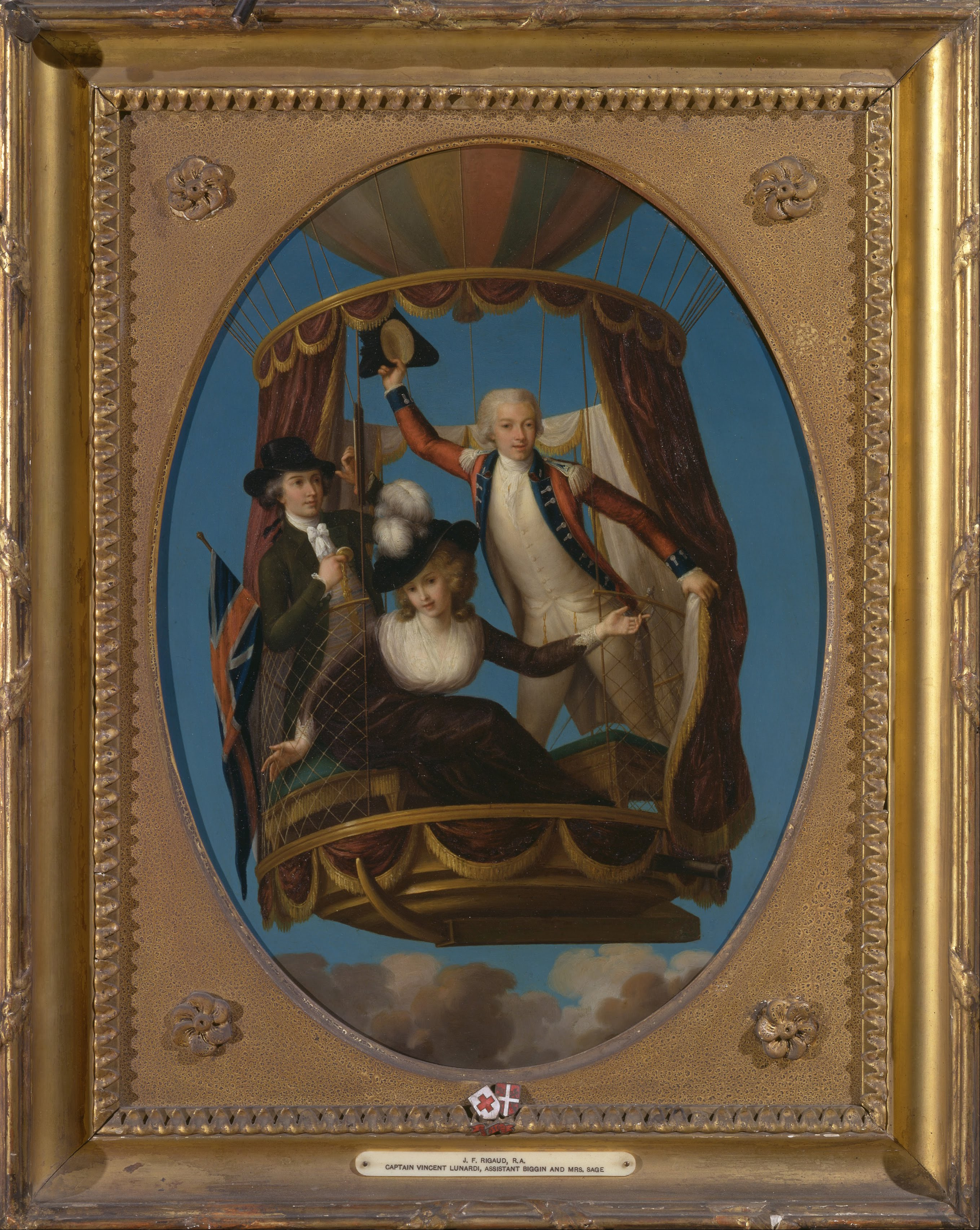
Engraving by Rigaud of George Biggin, Mrs Hoare and Vincenzo Lunardi in a balloon

Mrs Sage's first flight was planned by Lunardi in May 1785, when the two of them, plus George Biggin, were due to ascend from London, but, as was common in the early days of ballooning, the weight proved too great to allow the balloon - which relied on an adequate supply of hydrogen - to get off the ground, so Mrs Sage and George Biggin had their places taken by three animals: a pigeon, a cat and a dog.

The follow-up plan was for Mrs Sage, George Biggin and Lunardi himself to make the ascent along with two other guests, Colonel Hastings and a female acquaintance, who had been promised a place only if the balloon proved capable of carrying more than three passengers. However, the balloon was unable to take off with the weight of all five passengers, so the woman and Hastings got out, followed by Lunardi. Biggin and Mrs Sage were left to attempt the voyage and were in the air for an hour and a half. An hour into the flight Mrs Sage was thought to have fainted but was actually assisting with the ascension of the balloon. The balloon had turned North West finally coming to rest in a farmer's field near Harrow. Due to the force of the wind, their landing was not smooth and Mrs Sage sustained an injury as she had hit her leg on an iron rod.

They were assisted in getting down by some schoolboys. In the course of the journey they had time to eat a meal consisting of chicken and ham and drink some Florence wine, discarding the bottle over the side.

Mrs Sage went on to write about her experiences in a short publication titled A Letter, Addressed to a Female Friend, By Mrs. Sage, the First English Female Aerial Traveller, which was printed later in the year and sold at a price of one shilling.

A depiction of the balloon flight, showing three passengers, had been created in advance by John Francis Rigaud.

== Later life ==
Mrs Sage gained some notoriety for her achievement, writing "the door is never quiet an instant" in her short account of the journey But by 1804 she was working at Sadler's Wells Theatre, under the name of "Mrs Robinson", as a dresser and wardrobe keeper for Charles Dibdin the younger. From there, she moved on to the Crow Street Theatre, Dublin, and later to Drury Lane. Nothing is heard of her after 1817.
