= Welham Green railway station =

Railway station in Hertfordshire, England

Welham Green
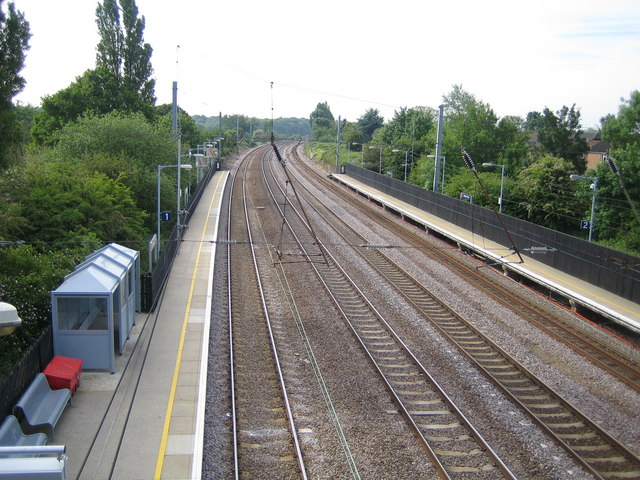
- The station, viewed from the bridge
- Interactive map of Welham Green

General information
- Location: Welham Green
- Local authority: Borough of Welwyn Hatfield
- Grid reference: TL237056
- Managed by: Great Northern
- Station code: WMG
- DfT category: E
- Number of platforms: 2

National Rail annual entry and exit
- 2020–21: ▼65,068
- 2021–22: ▲0.153 million
- 2022–23: ▲0.197 million
- 2023–24: ▲0.224 million
- 2024–25: ▲0.253 million

Key dates
- 29 September 1986: Opened

Other information
- External links: Departures; Facilities
- Coordinates: 51.736°N 0.211°W

Welham Green railway station serves the village of Welham Green in Hertfordshire, England. It is 15 miles 50 chains (25.1 km) measured from King's Cross on the East Coast Main Line.

Welham Green is just south of the scene of the Hatfield rail crash in 2000 and was initially identified in BBC broadcasts as the location of the accident.

== History ==
Welham Green station was opened on 29 September 1986 on the site of the former Marshmoor Sidings. It has two platforms and was opened by British Rail.

The station was built with funding from Welwyn District Council, Hertfordshire County Council, Hatfield Parish Council and British Rail.

The booking office at Welham Green was equipped with APTIS in December 1986, making it one of the first stations with the ticketing system which was eventually found across the UK at all staffed British Rail stations by the end of the 1980s.

== Facilities ==
A booking office, open during the morning rush hour, is located on the northbound platform and is reached, from the west, through the station car park. A self-service 'Shere' ticket machine was installed in Autumn 2008 on the road overbridge, at the entrance to the northbound platform.

There are shelters on both platforms, and a small amount of seating near them.

== Services ==
All services at Welham Green are operated by Great Northern using Class 717 EMUs.

The typical off-peak service in trains per hour is:

- 2 tph to Moorgate
- 2 tph to Welwyn Garden City

Additional services call at the station during the peak hours.

Preceding station	National Rail	Following station
Brookmans Park	Great Northern: Great Northern Route; Stopping Services	Hatfield

== Ticket Office Opening Times & Station Staffing Hours ==
Below are the current opening and staffing times for Welham Green, as of 2010.

Ticket Office Hours
Day	Opens	Closes
Monday to Friday	07:15	10:15
Saturday	-	-
Sunday	-	-

Station Staffing Hours
Day	From	Until
Monday to Friday	07:00	10:30
Saturday	-	-
Sunday	-	-
