= Standon Green End =

Hamlet in Hertfordshire, England

Coordinates: 51.86104°N 0.019697°W

- Location within Hertfordshire
- OS grid reference: TL363199
- District: East Hertfordshire
- Shire county: Hertfordshire
- Region: East
- Country: England
- Sovereign state: United Kingdom
- Post town: Stevenage
- Dialling code: 01920
- Police: Hertfordshire
- Fire: Hertfordshire
- Ambulance: East of England

Standon Green End is a hamlet situated just off the A10 road between Ware and Puckeridge in Hertfordshire. At the 2011 Census the population of the hamlet is included in the civil parish of Standon.

Standon Green End is most notable for being at the final landing point of Vincenzo Lunardi's historic first hot air balloon flight in 1784.

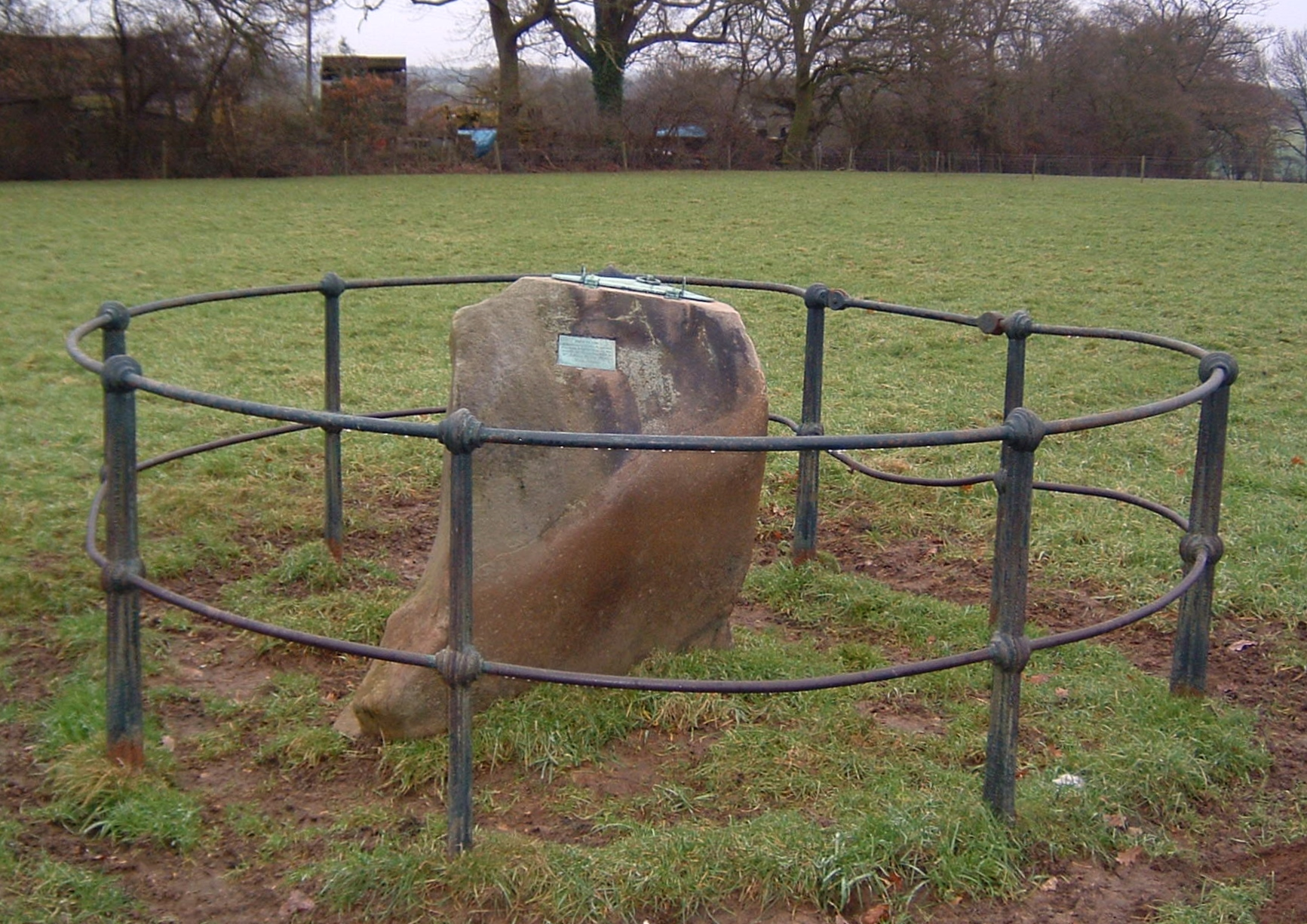
The Lunardi Balloon Stone

There is a boulder near to the settlement, with a plaque attached, the text reading:

Let posterity know and knowing be astonished that on the 15th day of September 1784 Vincent Lunardi, of Lucca in Tuscany, the first aerial traveller in Britain mounting from the artillery ground in London and traversing the regions of the air for two hours and fifteen minutes. In this spot revisited the Earth on this rude monument that wondrous enterprise, successfully achieved by the power of chemistry and the fortitude of man that improvements in science which the great author of all knowledge patronising by his providence the invention of mankind, hath graciously permitted to their benefit and his own eternal glory.
