= Bell Bar =

Hamlet in Hertfordshire, England

Coordinates: 51°43′48″N 00°11′13″W

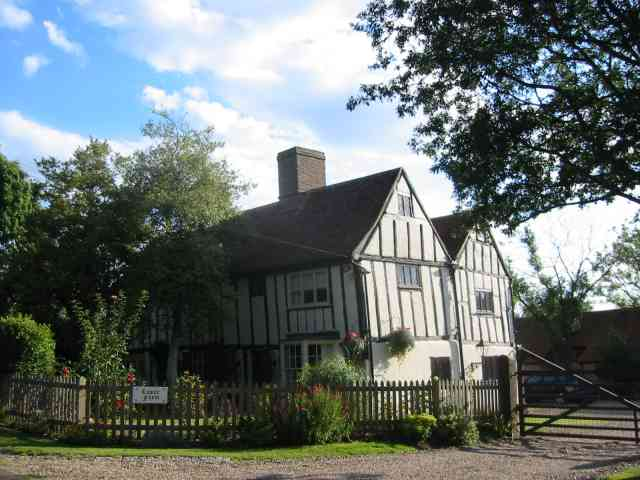
Lower Farm at Bell Bar

Bell Bar is a hamlet located in North Mymms, Hertfordshire, England. It is in the civil parish of North Mymms.

Thought to be named after the ancient Bell Inn which stood nearby, Bell Bar (often spelt as "Bell Barr" on old maps, such as that of Emanuel Bowen, c. 1720) was a cluster of dwellings around this coaching inn on the Great North Road (United Kingdom) which used to pass through Bell Bar along what is now called Bell Lane. However, in 1851 the route of this road (now the A1000 road) was altered to avoid the steep hill to the south of the hamlet and to avoid cutting through the grounds of Hatfield House.

The hoped-for return on the considerable investment in these works never materialised, as within a few years the opening of the Great Northern Railway put an end to toll-paying long-distance traffic. It was this diversion that explains the apparent discrepancy in Charles Dickens' account of Bill Sykes, on the run from London after murdering Nancy, who Dickens describes coming down the hill from the London road and finding the welcome sight of the Eight Bells Inn in Hatfield. Nowadays the Eight Bells is on a quiet cul-de-sac.

These days Bell Bar has a petrol station, a few garden centres (notably the Dutch Nursery, established by immigrants Hans and Anna Henn in 1957, which moved to its present site in 1963 after a cucumber nursery had been ruined during the previous severe winter), a pub, a restaurant and other public facilities. A public footpath across fields and a narrow country road lead to the village of Welham Green, situated about a mile away on the East Coast Main Line.
