= North Mymms =

Village and civil parish in Hertfordshire, England

Coordinates: 51.72593°N 0.23359°W

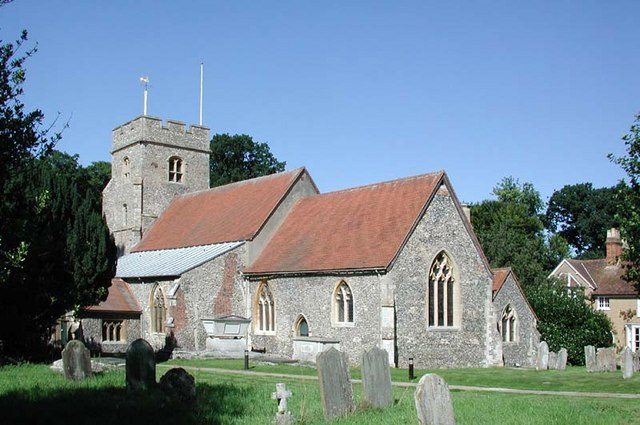

- Location within Hertfordshire
- Population: 8,921 (2011 census)
- Civil parish: North Mymms
- District: Welwyn Hatfield
- Shire county: Hertfordshire
- Region: East
- Country: England
- Sovereign state: United Kingdom
- Post town: HATFIELD
- Postcode district: AL9
- Dialling code: 01707
- Police: Hertfordshire
- Fire: Hertfordshire
- Ambulance: East of England

North Mymms is a civil parish in the Welwyn Hatfield district, in the county of Hertfordshire, England. At the 2011 Census the civil parish had a population of 8,921.

The village itself is an enclosure. North Mymms Park and Brookmans Park enclose large areas of the parish. Even the parish church (St Mary's) stands in the park of North Mymms; in it is a chapel, the burialplace of the Coningsbys. There is a monument to Robert Knolles, also of North Mymms Place, dated 1458, and a brass to a priest. There is a large monument to Lord Somers, Baron Evesham, and lord chancellor in the time of William III, d. 1716. The monument was erected by his sister, Lady Elizabeth Jekyll.

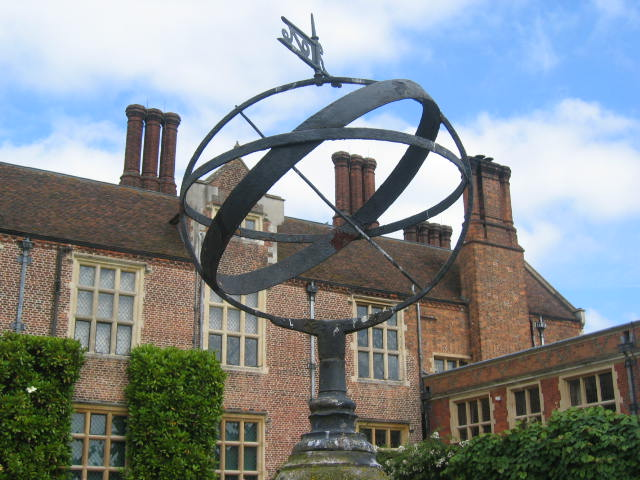
North Mymms Place

The civil parish includes:

- North Mymms Place: The Elizabethan house of 1576 belonged to the Coningsby family. John Conningsby died in 1544 and entailed the house to his wife, Elizabeth, during her lifetime. Elizabeth remarried to William Dodds. On Elizabeth's and subsequently William's death, the house reverted to John's son, Henry in 1576, which he then demolished and built a new mansion house between 1576 and 1578. Tree-ring dating of the main roof timbers confirms these dates. During the ownership of Thomas Coningsby, a Royalist leader in Hertfordshire, the house was plundered by the Parliamentarians. Later North Mymms Park belonged to the Hyde family. The house is famous for its collection of tapestries and for its panelling and fittings. An early 17th-century painted frieze of the "Nine Worthies" was rediscovered in the 20th century.

North Mymms House was a location for the 1983 film The Wicked Lady, starring Faye Dunaway as a bored aristocratic lady who takes up highway robbery, while the exterior appeared in Agatha Christie's Marple's The Mirror Crack'd from Side to Side as the house of Marina Gregg.

- Bell Bar
- Brookmans Park: The park includes the former park of Gobions (demolished), once the property of Sir Thomas More, and around the turn of the 19th century to an East India merchant, Thomas Holmes, whose daughter became the novelist Ann Doherty. A lofty castellated gateway in the park is now called "The Folly". In 1956 North Mymms Parish Council acquired the land and the lake now known as Gobions Open Space.
- Water End
- Welham Green

North Mymms is also home to the Hawkshead Campus of the Royal Veterinary College, part of the University of London. The campus also includes the Equine Referral Hospital, and the Queen Mother Hospital for Animals. At the 2011 Census the population was 8,921.

== Etymology ==
North Mymms is spelt differently from its sister village of South Mimms. The spellings Mymms and Mimms appear to have been used interchangeably over the centuries, until 20 February 1939 when Hertfordshire County Council decided that the spelling be fixed as Mymms.
