= Brookmans Park railway station =

Railway station in Hertfordshire, England

Brookmans Park
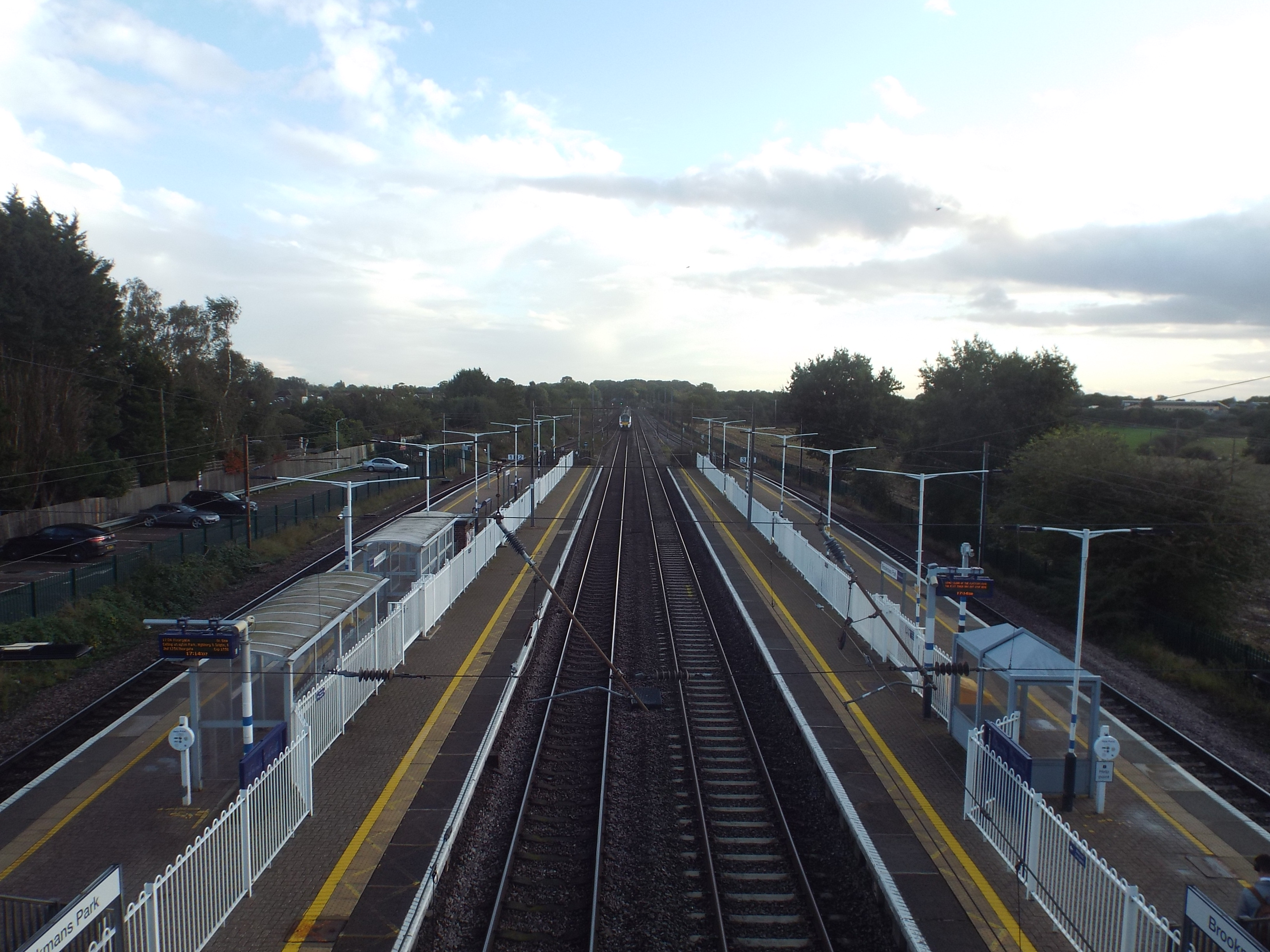
- The station's 4 platforms
- Interactive map of Brookmans Park

General information
- Location: Brookmans Park
- Local authority: Borough of Welwyn Hatfield
- Grid reference: TL241040
- Managed by: Great Northern
- Station code: BPK
- DfT category: E
- Number of platforms: 4

National Rail annual entry and exit
- 2020–21: ▼49,302
- 2021–22: ▲0.151 million
- 2022–23: ▲0.220 million
- 2023–24: ▲0.249 million
- 2024–25: ▲0.275 million

Railway companies
- Original company: London and North Eastern Railway
- Post-grouping: London and North Eastern Railway

Key dates
- 19 July 1926: Station opened

Other information
- External links: Departures; Facilities
- Coordinates: 51.721°N 0.205°W

Brookmans Park railway station serves the village of Brookmans Park in Hertfordshire, England. The station is located 14 miles 37 chains (23.3 km) north of London Kings Cross on the East Coast Main Line, on the stretch between Finsbury Park and Hatfield.

== History ==
The station was opened by the London and North Eastern Railway (LNER) on 19 July 1926.

During World War II, the station played a small part in the signing of the Anglo-Soviet Treaty. On 21 May 1942, LNER Class A4 locomotive number 4495 Golden Fleece brought Soviet foreign minister Vyacheslav Molotov to the station, where he was met by his British counterpart Anthony Eden. The pair and their staff were then driven to the Chequers estate, where the treaty was negotiated.

== Facilities ==
The station is only staffed part-time, with the ticket office being open 06:50–10:00, Monday to Friday. Customer help points are available for assistance out of hours. Other facilities include passenger information displays and waiting shelters. Oyster Cards are not valid at the station. However, contactless bank cards may be used.

== Station layout ==
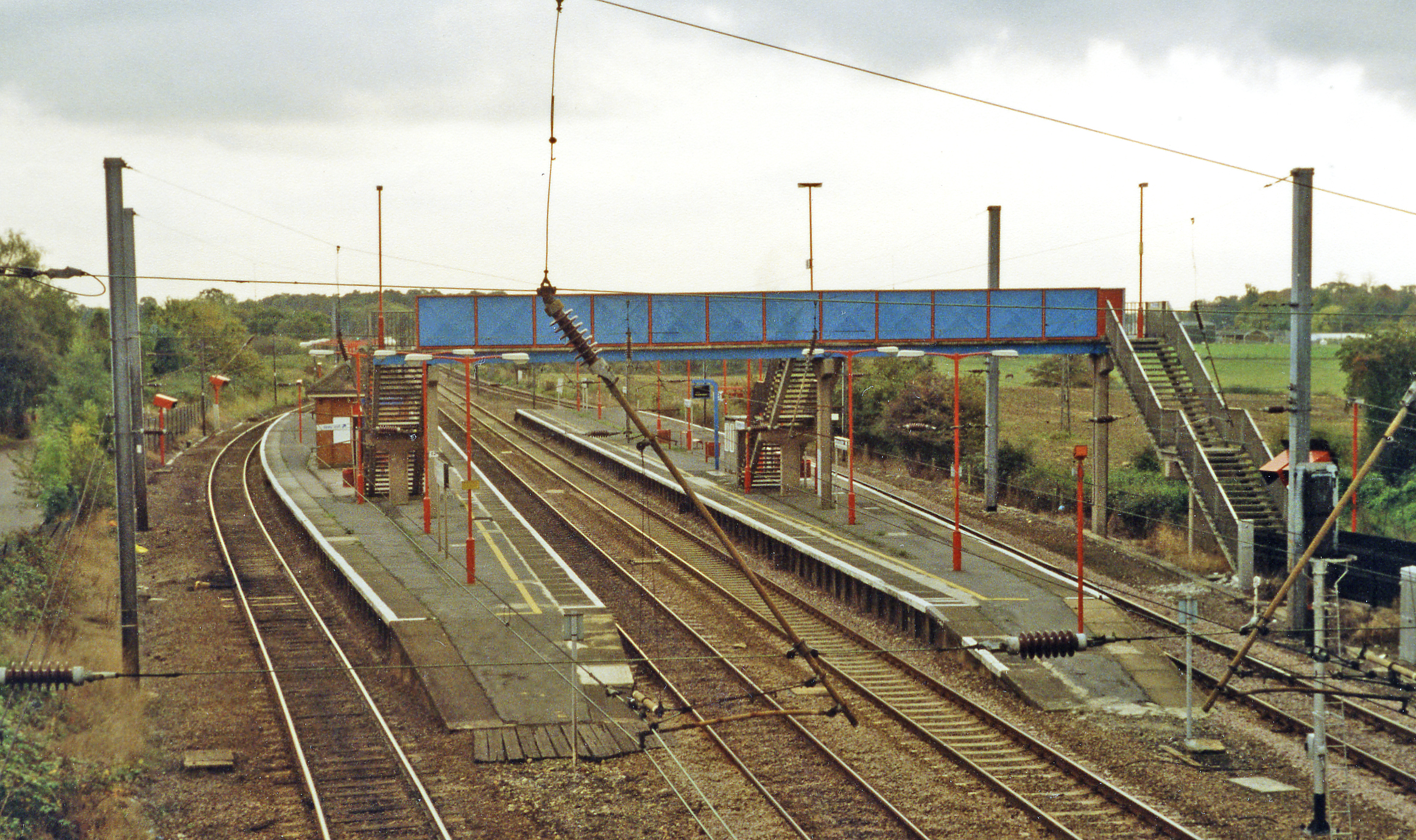
The station painted in Network SouthEast colours, 1993

The station has four platforms in total, consisting of two island platforms; only platforms 1 and 4, facing the route's slow lines, are used regularly. Both platforms are accessible only via a footbridge, with no step-free access available. A station car park with 69 spaces parallels the island platforms to the east. The station building (an LNER survivor) at the north-west of the station serves as the part-time ticket office.

== Services ==
All services at Brookmans Park are operated by Great Northern using Class 717 EMUs.

The typical off-peak service in trains per hour is:

- 2 tph to Moorgate
- 2 tph to Welwyn Garden City

Additional services call at the station during the peak hours.

Preceding station	National Rail	Following station
Potters Bar	Great Northern: Great Northern Route; Stopping Services	Welham Green
