= Steph McGovern =

English journalist and TV presenter (born 1982)

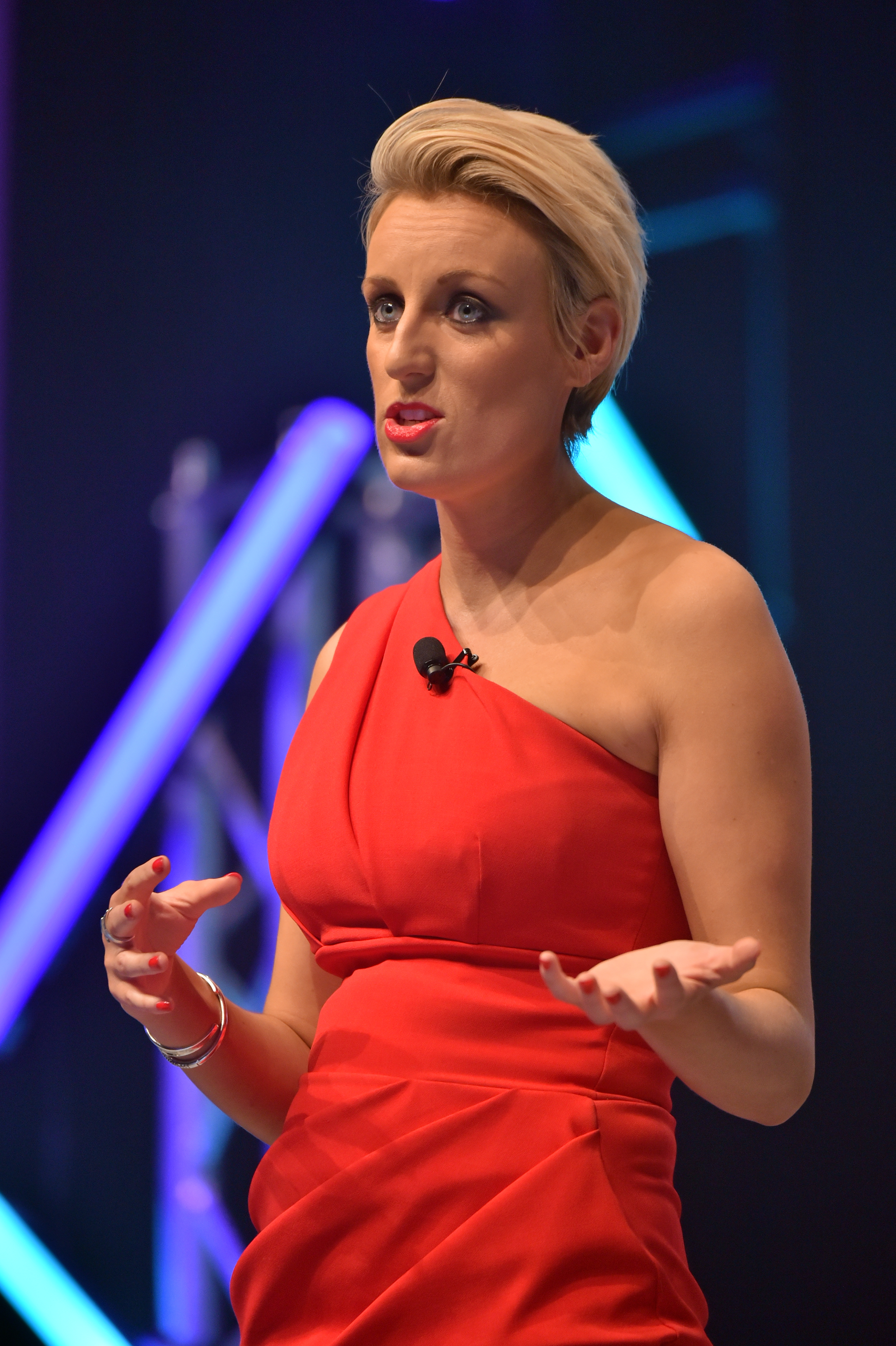
- McGovern in 2015
- Born: Stephanie Rose McGovern; 31 May 1982 (age 44); North Shields, Tyne and Wear, England
- Education: University College London (BSc)
- Occupations: Journalist, television presenter
- Television: Steph's Packed Lunch; BBC Breakfast; Pocket Money Pitch; Shop Well for Less? Watchdog; Have I Got News for You; Made in Great Britain; The Masked Dancer; Celebrity Bear Hunt
- Children: 1

Stephanie Rose McGovern (born 31 May 1982) is an English journalist and television presenter. She hosted Steph's Packed Lunch on Channel 4 from 2020 to 2023. She worked for the BBC as the main business presenter for BBC Breakfast, often co-hosting the entire programme.

== Early life ==
McGovern was born in 1982 in North Shields, Tyne and Wear, but grew up in Middlesbrough, North Yorkshire. Her father is Irish and is a professional artist and former art teacher, while her mother worked as an NHS radiographer. She is an only child. In 1998, at the start of her sixth form studies, she won an Arkwright Engineering Scholarship for her potential to be a future leader in the engineering industry. From 1998 to 2000, at Macmillan Academy, in the sixth form, she studied Maths, Physics, Design Technology and Business Studies.

At the age of 19, she was awarded the Young Engineers Clubs' "Young Engineer for Britain", and during a gap year Year in Industry before a then-planned mechanical engineering degree at Imperial College, McGovern was a junior member of Black+Decker's Six Sigma team in Spennymoor, saving Black+Decker £150,000 a year by improving production techniques used for the Leaf Hog (Blower/Vacuum/Mulcher), and later receiving an EEF/Year in Industry Award for Contribution to Business.

She attended University College London, where, in 2005, she received a BSc in science communication and policy in the Department of Science and Technology Studies. In 2013, she was awarded an honorary doctorate by Teesside University.

== Career ==
McGovern started at the BBC doing work experience on the Tomorrow's World programme, before securing part-time employment as a researcher in current affairs. She became the main producer for daily financial news on the Today programme on Radio 4, before becoming the lead producer of business news on the BBC's One, Six and Ten O'Clock news bulletins, working with the then business editor, Robert Peston.

McGovern has presented BBC Radio 5 Live's Wake Up to Money and On the Money and was BBC Breakfast's main business presenter beginning on 30 September 2011, replacing Simon Jack, as well as a regular presenter of the entire show. She presented Pocket Money Pitch for CBBC.

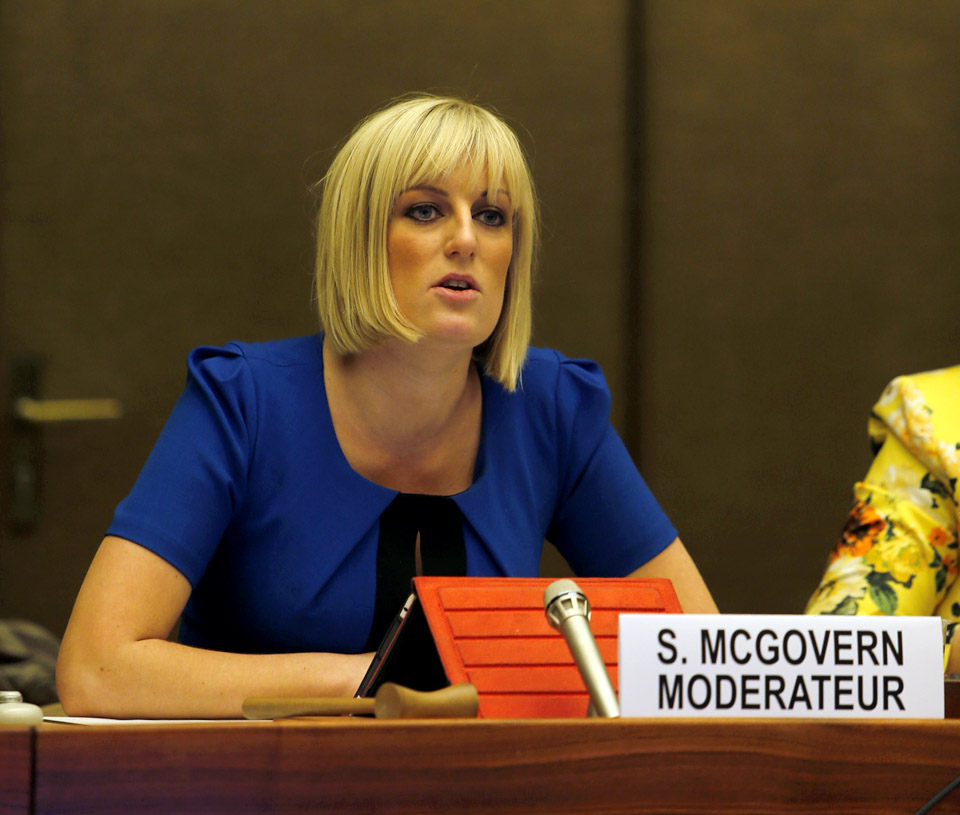
McGovern serving as a moderator at an UNCTAD conference in 2013

Since March 2016, she has co-presented the consumer series Shop Well for Less with Alex Jones for BBC One. In 2018, McGovern presented a six-part BBC series called Made in Great Britain.

McGovern joined the BBC Watchdog presenting team from autumn 2016. She also co-presented Can Britain Have a Pay Rise? for BBC Two alongside James O'Brien and has been both a panellist and host on Have I Got News for You.

In October 2018, McGovern stated that she found Donald Trump "creepy" after he referred to her as "beautiful" during an interview in 2012. She is said to have brushed off Trump's comments by telling him she had heard "better lines" in Middlesbrough's Club Bongo.

McGovern went on maternity leave from BBC Breakfast on 4 September 2019. On 21 October, it was announced that she would not be returning to the BBC but would be joining Channel 4. She had been expected to host The Steph Show from spring 2020 at Channel 4's then-new base in Leeds, however the COVID-19 pandemic meant that she began presenting The Steph Show from her front room on 30 March 2020. The show eventually launched on 14 September 2020 as Steph's Packed Lunch.

In 2021, she was elected as an Honorary Fellow of the Royal Academy of Engineering, recognised as a "tireless champion for engineering and vocational skills".

In December 2021, McGovern was featured in the BBC Four series Walking with..., walking in Littondale in the Yorkshire Dales.

McGovern was a contestant in the second series of The Masked Dancer under the stage name 'Tomato Sauce'. Her first appearance was on 10 September 2022 (Episode 2) and she was voted off on 1 October 2022 (Episode 5). She also hosts industrial events.

McGovern hosts The Rest Is Money podcast with her friend Robert Peston.

In September 2024, McGovern announced she had joined the cast of the upcoming BBC LGBTQ+ comedy Smoggie Queens, in her first acting role.

In 2025, McGovern was a finalist on Netflix's reality competition television series, Celebrity Bear Hunt.

In February 2025, McGovern won £125,000 for charity, when she was a contestant on a Who Wants to Be a Millionaire? Celebrity Special.

The Big Deal with Steph McGovern launched on BBC 2 in August 2026, in which she hosts a competition for aspring art dealers.

== Personal life ==
McGovern is a former champion Irish dancer and still often attends international competitions, where she helps to coach dancers.

McGovern has dated both men and women. In 2021, she explained "I've never officially come out... I didn't do this big thing of 'I am gay' like my mate Reg did... I just kind of go with the flow of things, and I did not really overthink it." On 14 July 2019, McGovern announced that she was pregnant and that she and her girlfriend were expecting their first child. On 4 November 2019, McGovern gave birth to a girl.

McGovern lives in North Tyneside. She also owns a house in her hometown of Middlesbrough, which was the first property she bought; a three-bedroom terraced home purchased for £130,000 just before the 2008 financial crisis, it is worth the same amount nearly two decades later.

== Books ==
- Deadline (Macmillan, 2025) ISBN 9781035035236

Media offices
Preceded by Simon Jack	Business Presenter: BBC Breakfast; 2011–2019	Succeeded by Nina Warhurst
