= Learning Grid =

The Learning Grid was a UK charity that promoted hands-on activities related to science and engineering for school pupils and students in the United Kingdom. The name Learning Grid was also used to refer collectively to the activities themselves.

== History ==
Motorsport Development UK (MDUK) was established in November 2003 with funding from four regional development agencies (East Midlands Development Agency, Advantage West Midlands, South East England Development Agency, and East of England Development Agency), and from the DTI, with about £11.5m each year. Martin Fellows was head of MDUK. MDUK was a six-year programme, and came to a close in March 2009. MDUK was headquartered at Silverstone.

The Learning Grid began in 2005 as a recommendation of the Motorsport Competitiveness Panel, a body set up by the UK Department of Trade and Industry whose final report was announced by the then Secretary of State Patricia Hewitt on 11 July 2003. The name 'Learning Grid' was thought to refer to a motorsport starting grid, since many of the activities had a motorsport theme, although another derivation could be the representation of activities on a map or grid showing the age group on the X axis and level of time commitment required on the Y axis.

It was officially launched at Goodwood in October 2005, with an event hosted by Greenpower, with Bob Gilbert and a speech given by Charles Gordon-Lennox, Earl of March and Kinrara.

== Structure ==
A Motorsport Academy was also established in 2006. Another programme of MDUK was Energy Efficient Motorsport. Learning Grid was headquartered at Savoy Place, home of the IET, in the City of Westminster.

On 2 February 2007, it became a not-for-profit limited company. At the end of 2009, the registered office was moved from Savoy Place to Bromyard in Herefordshire. One of the directors of the company was Roger Putnam. This company was dissolved on 24 May 2011.

== Activities ==
22 separate activities achieved the Learning Grid quality standard, including Formula Student, F1 in Schools, Primary Engineer, Greenpower, STEM days and residential courses run by the Smallpeice Trust, the Shell Eco-marathon, F1 in Schools, the Engineering Education Scheme and The Year in Industry. Accreditation was valid for 3 years, with an annual review.

== Quality ==
The Learning Grid created its Learning Grid Quality Standard for engineering and science activities. Accredited programmes featured in a Guide published each autumn which was available to assist teachers in choosing suitable programmes for their pupils. The Learning Grid also ran an annual showcase event at Rockingham Motor Speedway near Corby in Northamptonshire.

== See also ==
- Category:Motorsport in the United Kingdom
- National College for Motorsport (NC4M), established in 2003
