= Stanborough School, Welwyn Garden City =

Grammar school in Welwyn Garden City, England

Stanborough School

Location
- Lemsford Lane; Welwyn Garden City, Hertfordshire, AL8 6YR; England; 51°47′28″N 0°13′10″W

Information
- Type: Grammar (1939–1968); Comprehensive (1968–2012); Academy (2012–)
- Motto: High Expectations -Mutual Respect - Quality Learning - Success For All
- Religious affiliation: None
- Established: 1939
- Founder: Richard Dickington
- Specialist: Maths and Computing
- Department for Education URN: 137847 Tables
- Ofsted: Reports
- Headteacher: Merry John
- Staff: 141
- Gender: Mixed
- Age: 11 to 18
- Enrolment: 1412
- Houses: Brocket, Hatfield, Knebworth, Sopwell
- Former name: Welwyn Grammar School
- Website: http://www.stanborough.herts.sch.uk

Stanborough School is a secondary academy school located in Welwyn Garden City, Hertfordshire, England. It is situated off Stanborough Road (A6129), near the A1(M), and across the road from the headquarters of Hertfordshire Constabulary, a golf driving range and the Gosling Sports Park. The East Coast Main Line is about 1 km away.

It was founded by Richard Dickington during WW2 for evacuated children to get an education. It was originally a grammar school (1939-1968), then a comprehensive school (1968-2012), and in 2012 it became an academy.

== History ==
=== Grammar school ===
Stanborough School was founded as a selective grammar school in 1939. It had around 550 girls and boys in the 1960s.

=== Comprehensive ===
It became an all-ability comprehensive school in 1968. In the early 1980s it had around 900 boys and girls.

=== Merger with Sir John Newsom School ===
In September 1998, nearby Sir John Newsom School was merged with Stanborough School and its pupils transferred across to the Stanborough site.

=== Academy status ===
The school gained academy status in February 2012 with a specialism in maths and computing. The school is independent of local authority control and is legally a private company limited by guarantee registered at Companies House with registration number 07900439.

== Sixth Form Consortium ==
Stanborough Sixth form is part of a wider consortium of many secondary schools in the area. Stanborough offers a range of subjects at A level on site. English, History, Mathematics, Science, Computer Science, Psychology are just a few examples. Other schools aligned with the sixth form consortium include:

- Monk's Walk School
- Ridgeway Academy
- Bishop's Hatfield Girls' School
- Onslow St Audrey's School

== Academic performance ==
Stanborough School often achieves GCSE results above the national average, with 51% of pupils achieving the equivalent of five or more GCSEs grade C or above including English and Maths in 2012. Their A Level results are consistently one of the highest of maintained schools in Hertfordshire.

== Notable former pupils ==
=== Welwyn Garden City Stanborough Grammar School ===
- Prof Roger Heath-Brown, Professor of Pure Mathematics since 1999 at the University of Oxford
- Alex Larke, musician and UK Eurovision Song Contest representative in 2015
- Michael Peacock OBE, television executive, Controller of BBC1 from 1965–7, and chairman from 1989 to 1995 of UBC Media Group
- Prof Michael Talbot, James and Constance Alsop Professor of Music from 1986 to 2003 at the University of Liverpool
- Glyn Maxwell, poet
- Prof. Jonathan Gregory, Professor of Climate Change and Modelling at the University of Reading and the Met Office.
- Klaus Hasselmann, 2021 Nobel Laureate in Physics
