= Ridgeway Academy =

School in Hertfordshire, England

Coordinates: 51.8020°N 0.1785°W

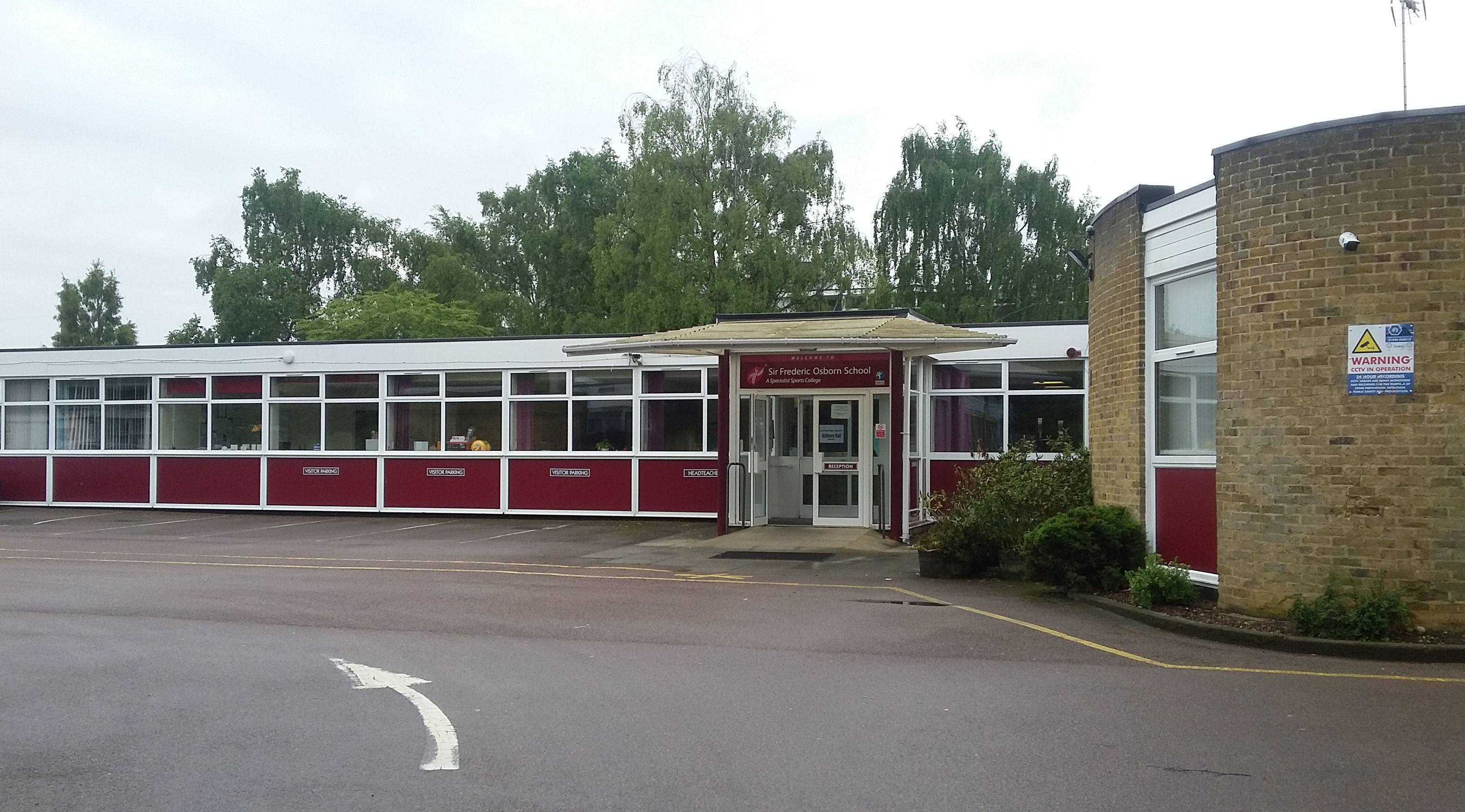

Location
- Herns Lane; Welwyn Garden City, Hertfordshire, AL7 2AF; England

Information
- Type: Academy
- Motto: "Everyone can achieve."
- Local authority: Hertfordshire
- Department for Education URN: 146305 Tables
- Ofsted: Reports
- Head teacher: Sarah Mitcherson
- Gender: Coeducational
- Age: 11 to 18
- Website: www.ridgeway.herts.sch.uk

Ridgeway Academy, formerly Sir Frederic Osborn School ("Sir Freds"), which itself was formed by the merging in 1968 of Attimore Hall School (secondary modern) and The High School (grammar school), is a secondary school in Welwyn Garden City, Hertfordshire, England. The school was built in 1956 as The High School and then Attimore Hall School was built adjacent to it in 1960, it is located in the Panshanger district of the town. In a 2025 Ofsted Report the school was rated "Good" and received the same rating across all levels. The school was named after Sir Frederic Osborn, a pioneer of the garden city movement. From September 2018 the school became an academy sponsored by the Alban Academies Trust (AAT) and was renamed the Ridgeway Academy with a new school uniform, badge and vision. The school is currently part of Ambition Education Trust, following the merger between ATLAS Multi Academy Trust and Alban Academies Trust from 1 September 2024.

The school has a school council, where representatives from each year group attend regular meetings to decide what changes need to be made to school life to make the experience more beneficial to students and staff alike. These meetings are chaired by the Head Boy and Head Girl.

A building programme over the past few years has given the school new science, technology and vocational education blocks, as well as dance and drama studios. The school has submitted and had a bid accepted to provide the school with a modern sports hall.

== Welwyn Hatfield Consortium ==
The school is part of the Welwyn Hatfield Consortium, which also includes:

- Monk’s Walk School
- Stanborough School
- Bishop's Hatfield Girls' School
- Onslow St Audrey's School

== Notable former pupils ==
- David James - Ex-England football goalkeeper.
- Nick Faldo - Professional golfer.
- Lisa Snowdon - Presenter and Fashion Model
- Caroline Deverill, West End actress

== Gallery ==
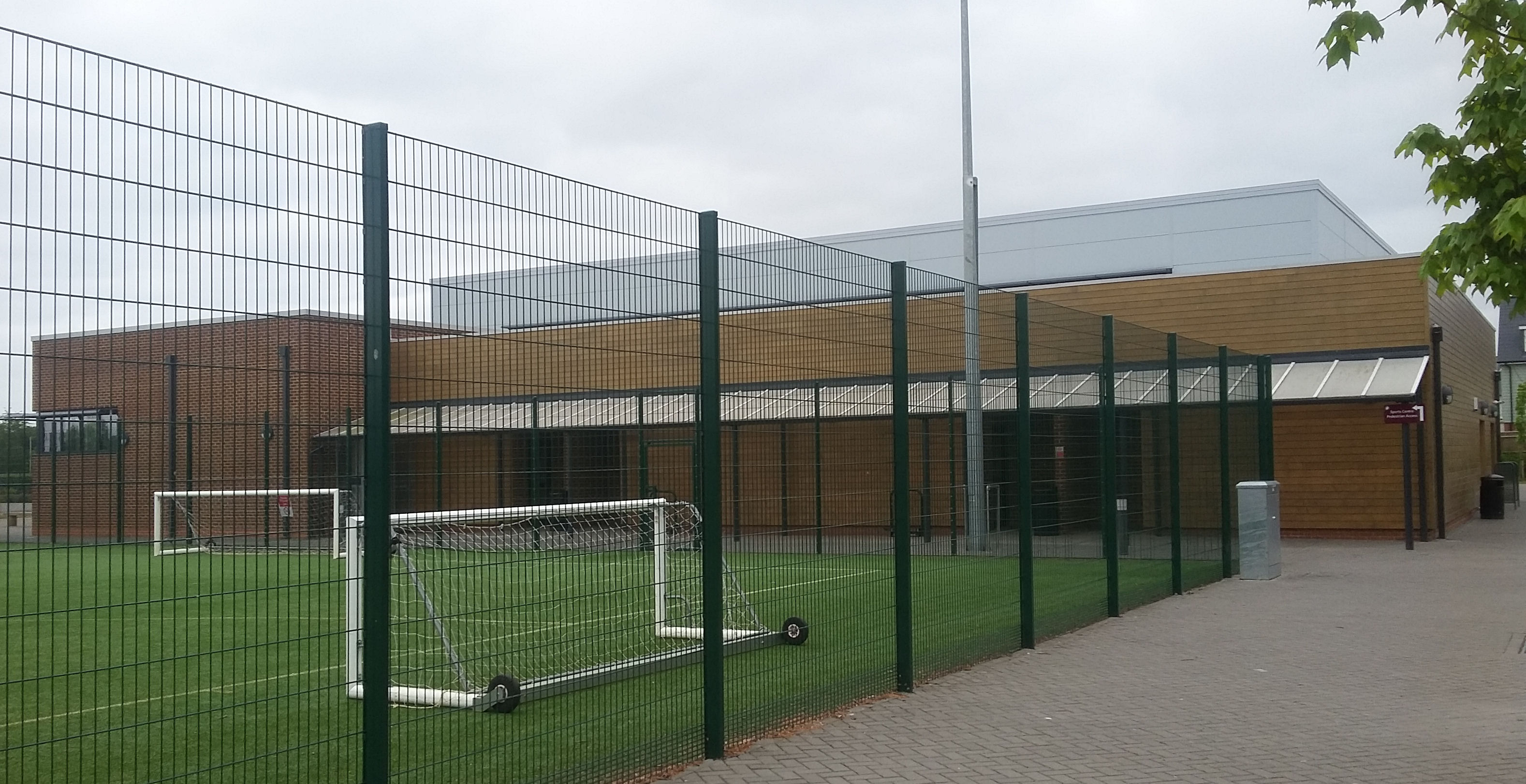
The Sports Hall

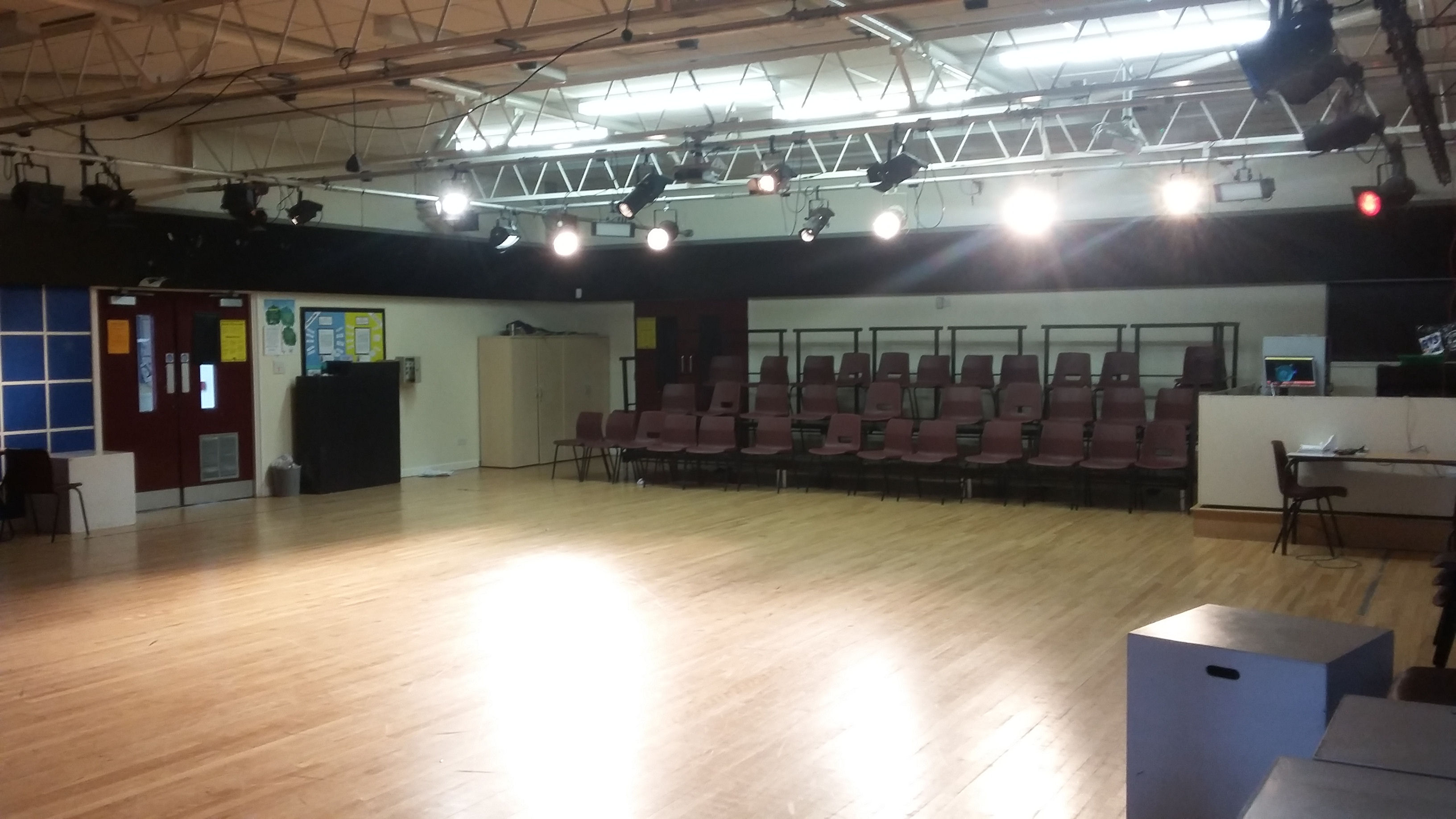
The Drama Studio

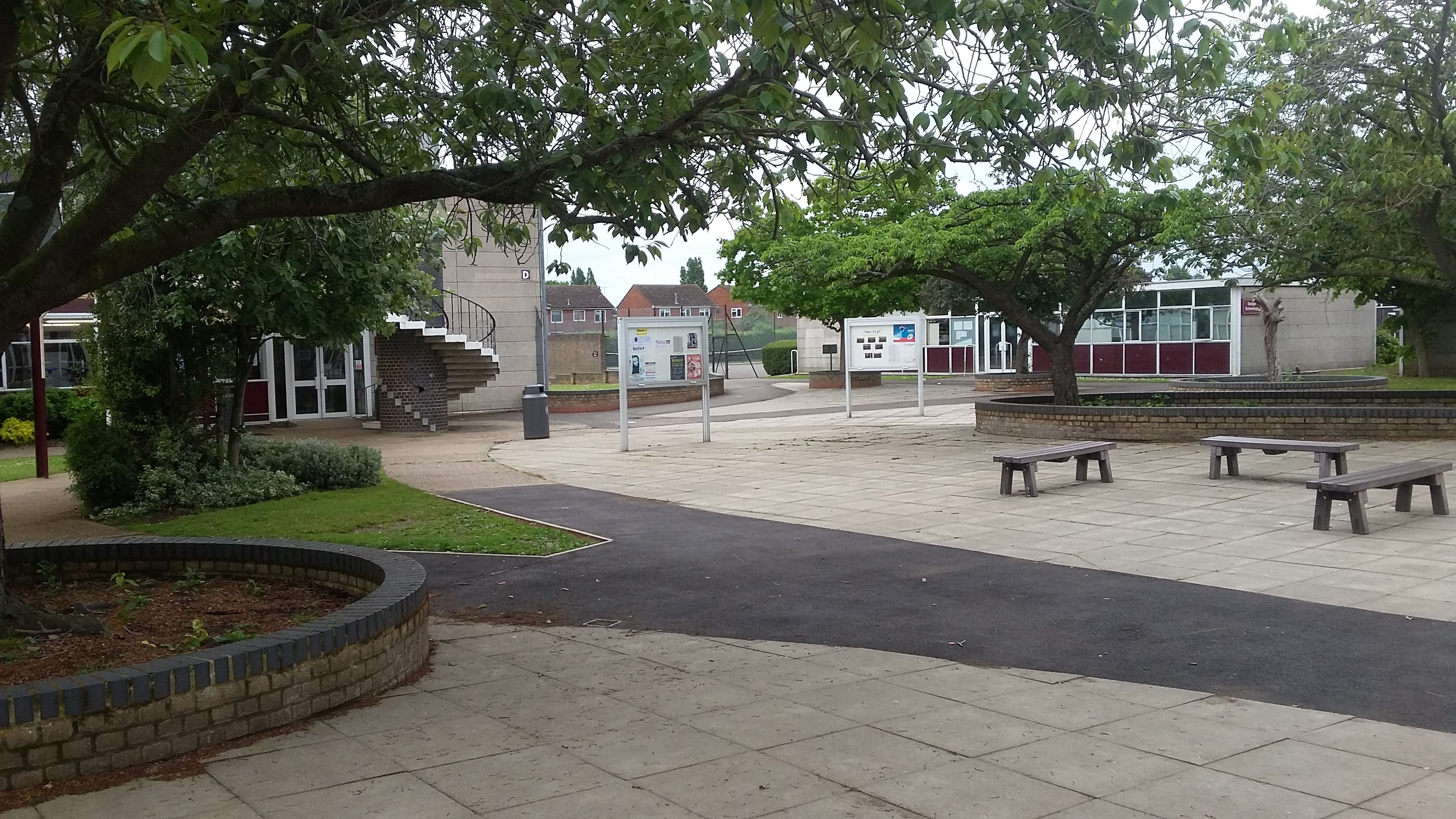
An open area
