= Engineering Development Trust =

UK not for shareholder profit organization

The Engineering Development Trust is a UK not for shareholder profit organization, which administers a number of schemes designed to encourage school pupils to have an interest and involvement in science and engineering

== History ==
The EDT was established in 1984.

In September 2017, long standing CEO Gordon Mizner retired from his position to be replaced by Julie Feest.

== Structure ==
It has a main office situated near Ridgeway Academy in the east of Welwyn Garden City, not far from the B195. Other regional office locations include Southampton, Plymouth and Glasgow.

== Operation ==
It runs the Go4Set residential courses to link school pupils with companies in the STEM or SET (Science, Engineering and Technology) field. It claims to be the largest provider of STEM enrichment activities for young people in the UK. All of the Engineering Development Trust's schemes are part of the Royal Academy of Engineering's BEST programme.

== See also ==
- Engineering Education Scheme
- Year in Industry
- Royal Academy of Engineering
