= Frederic Osborn =

British urban planner and activist

Sir Frederic James Osborn (1885–1978) was a leading member of the UK Garden city movement and was chairman of the Town and Country Planning Association. He lived in Welwyn Garden City with his wife and fellow campaigner Lady Margaret Paterson Osborn, the garden city he helped create, and a local school (Sir Frederic Osborn School) was named after him in 1968.

== Life ==
Born in 1885 in London, he left school at 15 for a job as an office boy. He attended night-school. He joined the Fabian Society, where he edited Fabian Nursling, as the magazine of the youth cohort was called.

In 1912, he took a job as secretary-manager of the Howard Cottage Society in Letchworth Garden City, founded by Ebenezer Howard. It was here that he formed the view that Government intervention was essential if new settlements were to be developed, setting this out as early as 1918 in an article on "The public control of the location of towns". This was a case he also made elsewhere under the pseudonym Edward Ormiston.

In 1916 Osborn married Margaret Paterson Robb, whom he had met at a summer school of the Fabian Society. Margaret had a major beneficial influence on his subsequent life and the Garden City Movement.

In 1919 Howard purchased land for a second garden city at Welwyn, and Osborn moved with him to become Company Secretary and Estate Manager. The Frederic and Margaret Osborn became pioneer residents in Welwyn Garden City, where, alongside Frederic, Margaret dedicated herself to the town's social welfare and educational and cultural interests. This included establishing the Welwyn Garden City Branch of the United Nations Association, of which she became president.

Frederic left the company in 1936, and devoted the rest of his life to promoting the garden city movement. He objected to the expansion of towns on the basis this imposed a burden of commuting which would be carry implications for cost, time and leisure. From 1938 onwards he advocated for the establishment of a London Regional Planning Commission with powers to establish boards to build new towns or expand existing ones. He was 61 when the New Towns Act he had been lobbying for received Royal Assent in 1946.

Osborn was a socialist and member of the Labour Party.

== Publications ==
- Frederic J. Osborn, Green-Belt Cities (first published 1946)
- Frederic J. Osborn & Arnold Whittick, New Towns (1978) ISBN 0-249-44140-3
- The letters of Lewis Mumford and Frederic J. Osborn: A transatlantic dialogue, 1938-70 ISBN 0-239-00099-4
