= John A. Church =

Australian oceanographer (born 1951)

John A. Church AO
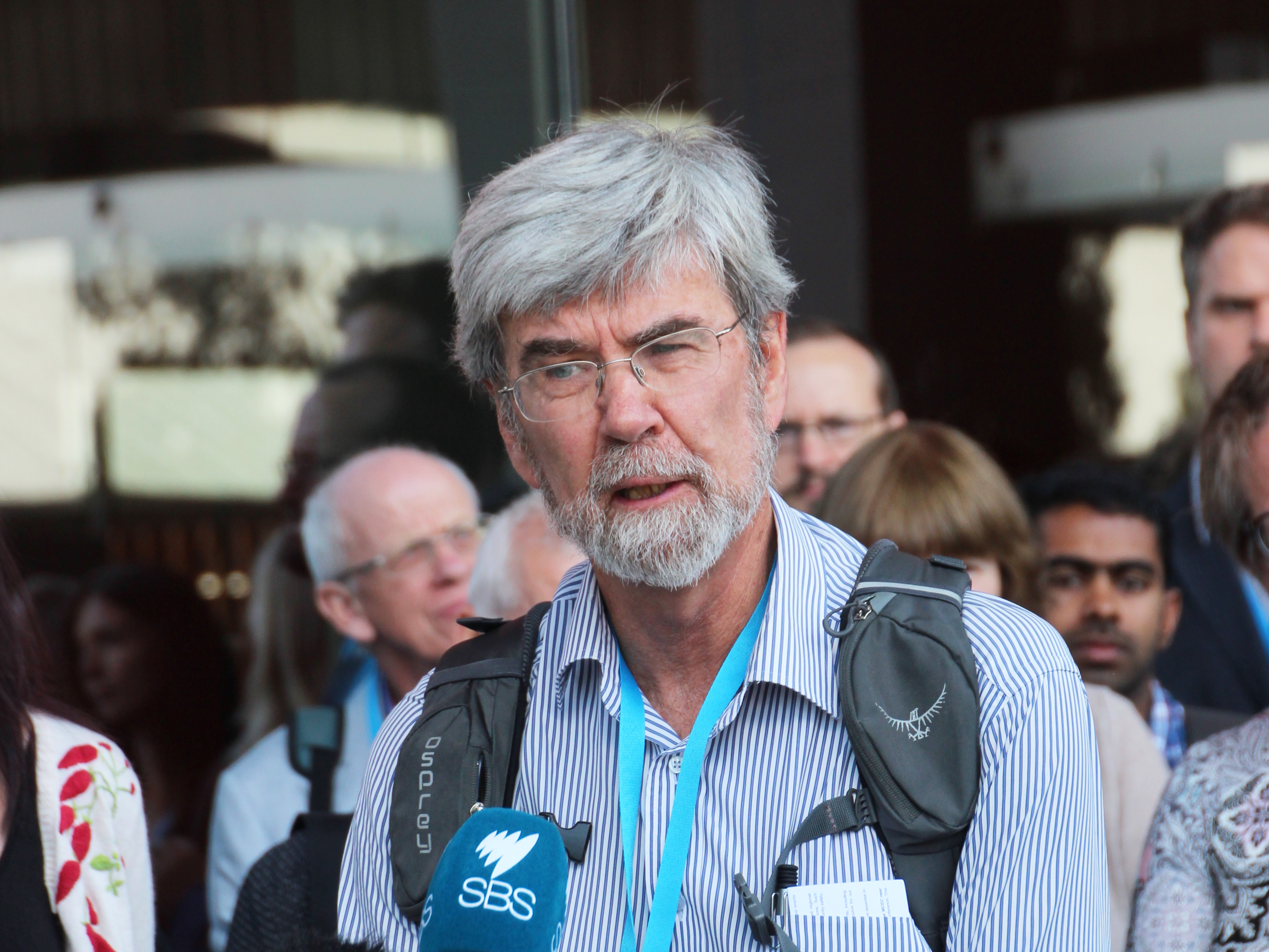
- Education: University of Queensland
- Occupation: Climatologist
- Employer: UNSW
- Known for: Physics; Oceanography; Climatology; Sea Level Rise
- Awards: James Cook Medal, 2022

John Alexander Church AO (born 1951) is an expert on sea level and its changes. He was co-convening lead author (with Jonathan M. Gregory) for the chapter on sea level in the IPCC Third Assessment Report. He was also a co-convening lead author for the IPCC Fifth Assessment Report. He is a member of the Joint Scientific Committee of the WCRP. He was a project leader at CSIRO, until 2016. He is currently a professor with the University of New South Wales' Climate Change Research Centre.

== Biography ==
Church graduated from the University of Queensland with a BSc in Physics in 1972. He obtained a Doctor of Philosophy in 1979.

Church has led a number of programs, including: CSIRO Division of Oceanography; Program Leader of the Oceanography Program of the Australian National Antarctic Research Expeditions; Project Leader, Southern Ocean Processes Project; CSIRO Division of Marine and atmospheric Research, Polar Waters Program, Antarctic Climate and Ecosystems Cooperative Research Centre. On an international level, Church has been the Principal Investigator for the NASA/CNES TOPEX/Poseidon Extended Satellite Mission.

Currently, Church is chair of the scientific committee of the World Climate Research Programme studying sea-level rise, and is leader of the Sea level Rise Project at the Antarctic Climate and Ecosystems Cooperative Research Centre. (2007)

== Awards ==
- 2006 Roger Revelle Medal by the Intergovernmental Oceanographic Commission
- 2006 CSIRO Medal for Research Achievement
- 2007 Eureka Prize for Scientific Research
- 2008 Presented the Australian Meteorological and Oceanographic Society R.H. Clarke Lecture
- 2018 BBVA Foundation Frontiers of Knowledge Award in the category of Climate Change jointly with Anny Cazenave and Jonathan M. Gregory for their outstanding contributions, the committee states, "to detecting, understanding and projecting the response of global and regional sea level to anthropogenic climate change."
- 2022 James Cook Medal
- 2023 Prince Albert I Medal

Church is a Fellow of the Australian Academy of Science, the Australian Academy of Technological Sciences and Engineering and the American Meteorological Society, and is a Member of the Australian Institute of Physics. He was appointed an Officer of the Order of Australia in the 2022 Australia Day Honours for "distinguished service to climate science through oceanographic and sea-level research and publications".

== Publications ==
- Christopher Watson, Richard Coleman, Neil White, John Church and Ramesh Govind, 2003. Absolute Calibration of TOPEX/Poseidon and Jason-1 using GPS Buoys in Bass Strait, Australia. Marine Geodesy (Special Issue on Jason-1 Calibration/Validation, Part 1), 26 (3-4), 285-304.
- McDougall, T. J., J. A. Church and D. R. Jackett, 2003: Does the nonlinearity of the equation of state impose an upper bound on the buoyancy frequency? Journal of Marine Research, 61, 745-764.
- Church, J.A. N.J. White, R. Coleman, K. Lambeck, and J.X. Mitrovica, 2004. Estimates of the regional distribution of sea-level rise over the 1950 to 2000 period. Journal of Climate, 17 (13), 2609-2625.
- Christopher Watson, Richard Coleman, Neil White, John Church and Ramesh Govind, 2004. TOPEX/Poseidon and Jason-1: absolute calibration in Bass Strait, Australia. Marine Geodesy (Special Issue on Jason-1 Calibration/Validation, Part 1), 27 (1-2), 107-131.
- K.J.E. Walsh, H. Betts, J. Church, A.B. Pittock, K. L. McInnes, D.R. Jackett, T.J. McDougall, 2004 Using sea level rise projections for urban planning in Australia. Journal of Coastal Research, 20(2), 586-598.
- Yoshikawa, Yasushi, John A. Church, Hiroshi Uchida and Neil J. White, 2004. Near bottom currents and their relation to the transport in the Kuroshio Extension, Geophysical Research Letters, 31(16), L16309, doi:10.1029/2004/GL020068.
- White, Neil J., John A. Church and Jonathan M. Gregory, 2005. Coastal and global averaged sea-level rise for 1950 to 2000. Geophysical Research Letters, 32(1), L01601, dio:10.1029/2004GL021391.
- Aoki, Shigeru, Nathaniel L. Bindoff and John A. Church, 2005. Interdecadal water mass changes in the Southern Ocean between 30ºE and 160ºE. Geophysical Research Letters, 32 (7), L07607, 7607-7607 Apr 14 2005
- Liu, Yun, Ming Feng, J ohn Church and Dongxiao Wang, 2005. Effect of salinity on estimating geostrophic transport of the Indonesian Throughflow along the IX1 XBT section. Journal of Oceanography, 61, 795-801.
- John A. Church, Neil J. White and Julie Arblaster, 2005. Significant decadal-scale impact of volcanic eruptions on sea level and ocean heat content. Nature, 438, 74-77 doi:10.1038/Nature04237.
- Church, J. A., and N. J. White (2006), A 20th century acceleration in global sea-level rise, Geophysical Research Letters, 33, L01602, doi:10.1029/2005GL024826.
- Domingues, Catia M., Susan E. Wijffels, Mathew E. Maltrud, John A. Church, Matthias Tomczak, 2006. The role of eddies in cooling the Leeuwin Current, Geophysical Research Letters, 33, L05603, doi:10.1029/2005GL025216.
- Mata, Mauricio M., Susan Wijffels, John A. Church, Matthias Tomczak, 2006. Statistical description of the East Australian Current low-frequency variability from the World Ocean Circulation Experiment PCM3 Current Meter Array. Journal of Marine and Freshwater Research, 57, 273-290.
- John A. Church, Neil J. White and John R. Hunter, 2006. Sea-level Rise at tropical Pacific and Indian Ocean islands. Global and Planetary Change, 53, 155-168. doi:10.1016/j.gloplacha.2006.04.001
- Mata, Mauricio M., Susan E. Wijffels, John A. Church, Matthias Tomczak, 2006. Eddy shedding and energy conversions in the East Australian Current. Journal of Geophysical Research, 111 (C9), C09034 doi:10.1029/2006JC003592.
- John Church, Neil White, John Hunter and Kathleen McInnes, 2006. Sea Change threatened by climate change. Australasian Science, November/December, 19-22.
- W. Cai, D. Bi, J. Church, T. Cowan, M. Dix, and L. Rotstayn, 2006. Pan-oceanic response to increasing anthropogenic aerosols: impacts on the Southern Hemisphere oceanic circulation. Geophysical Research Letters, 33, L21707, doi:10.1029/2006GL027513.
- John A. Church, John R. Hunter, Kathleen McInnes and Neil J. White, 2006. Sea-level rise around the Australian coastline and the changing frequency of extreme events. Australian Meteorological Magazine, 27 (Nov/Dec), 19-22.
- Church, J., Wilson, S., Woodworth, P. and Aarup, T. 2007. Understanding sea level rise and variability. Meeting report. Eos, Transactions, American Geophysical Union, 88(4), 23 January 2007, 43.
