= The Year in Industry =

UK engineering education scheme

The Year in Industry (YinI) is a UK scheme, which organises gap year placements for pre-university and undergraduate students. Each year The Year in Industry places around 750 students in engineering, science, IT, and business. The Year in Industry is run by the not for shareholder profit Engineering Development Trust and is accredited by the Learning Grid.

Students submit a Curriculum vitae to The Year in Industry detailing what field they are interested in finding a placement. The Year in Industry then send individual students 'company CV's' in that field. Students can then elect to be put forward for that placement, and may be selected by the company for interview and ultimately the placement. Placements usually last around 12 months, during which in between two and four on-site visits are made by YinI to check up on the student.

== The Scheme ==
The Year in Industry was set up in 1986 in the Bristol area and was originally called Pre-Formation of Undergraduate Engineers (PFUE). It has placed over 8500 students to date, in 2007 over 250 UK companies were involved in the scheme. The scheme has received a lot of praise from both universities and industry.

Placements usually last around 12 months and start between July and September, depending on the company and students requirements. Applications are free as The Year in Industry no longer charge an administrative fee to students. Students apply for placements through regional offices with the following process:

- The Student submits an on-line or written application to their chosen Year in Industry regional office.
- The geographically nearest regional office contacts the student to arrange an assessment interview. During the interview the students options are discussed, such as field of placement, and geographical location.
- If the student is accepted onto the scheme The Year in Industry will send them 'company CV's'.
- Students select which placements they would like to be put forward for.
- Companies will then shortlist candidates for interviews, which are held throughout the year.
- If a student is successful in an interview, they are offered a job with the company.

The Year in Industry is run by the non-profit organisation Engineering Development Trust, an independent education charity whose aim is to involve young people in engineering, science and technology. The scheme is also part of the Royal Academy of Engineering's BEST programme, likewise this is aimed at encouraging young people to undertake careers in engineering.

== Structure ==
The organisation is split up into twelve regional offices:

- South, incorporating the Year in Industry head office
- South West
- London
- East
- Wales
- East Midlands
- West Midlands
- North West
- Yorkshire
- North
- Scotland
- Northern Ireland

== Contribution to Business Award ==
Each year the Year in Industry runs a Contribution to Business award. This is aimed at providing students with the opportunity to demonstrate how they have made a difference to their company through their work placement. The award is open to all placement students, who submit a written application detailing the contributions they have made to their regional YinI office. This is supported by a statement written about the student by their line manager. Around eight people in each region are short-listed and are then required to give a short presentation to industry figures at the regional open day. The winner from each region then attends a national final to find an overall winner. In 2007 the winner of each regional final won a prize of £500. The overall winner will receive an award of £1000, plus three additional prizes are to be awarded of £500 each for innovation, communication skills and environment. The event in 2007 was held on Thursday, 6 September at The Royal College of Physicians, Regent's Park, London.

== Leadership course ==
Students are expected to attend and ideally complete a Chartered Management Institute course or equivalent during the year; different regions undertake different courses due to differences in funding. Most regions undertake an 'Introduction to Management' certificate and a 'Certificate in Management', the latter being accredited to NVQ level 3 standard. Teaching comes in the form of residential and one-day-a-month workshops, usually taught by local colleges, totalling around 14 days of tuition. Other regions undertake a smaller Institute of Leadership & Management Level 3 Certificate in Leadership. This involves around 60 hours of tuition spread over five one-day-a-month workshops. The course is organised by the Year in Industry and is paid for by the companies employing YinI students. Enrollment on this course gives YinI students membership to the NUS.

== Other Elements ==
At the end of the year students attend a regional open day. Here they exhibit their work and get the opportunity to talk to industry professionals about their experiences. The judging of the regional Contribution to Business Award also takes places at the open day.

In 2007/8 academic year the Year in Industry launched its 'YinI Combo' placements which allowed students to work for part of the year before travelling.

A voluntary maths course is offered by Loughborough University Best Maths Team. This course has been specially designed for engineering based students working in industry and aims to improve, and maintain students' maths skills over the course of the placement. The course is completed by the student through a series of distance learning modules and on-line tests.

At this moment in time the Year in Industry placements do not legally entitle participants to student council tax exemptions. Undergraduate students are entitled to the exemption since they remain members of their respective universities for the duration of the gap year, however, pre-university students with deferred entry to university do not qualify as students by council tax law. In the past some appeals with support from the Year in Industry have been successful.

== See also ==
- Engineering Development Trust
- The Learning Grid
- Engineering Education Scheme
