= Jonathan M. Gregory =

British climate modeller

Jonathan Gregory FRS
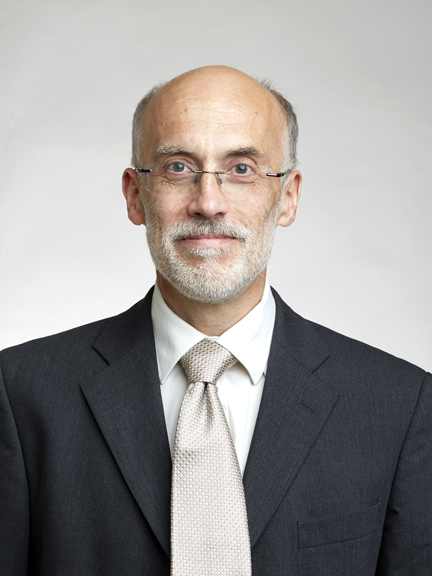
- Gregory in 2018
- Born: Welwyn Garden City
- Education: Stanborough School; University of Oxford (BA); University of Birmingham (PhD)
- Awards: BBVA Foundation Frontiers of Knowledge Award (2018)
- Scientific career
- Fields: climate change; Sea level change; Climate sensitivity
- Workplaces: Met Office; University of Reading; Hadley Centre for Climate Prediction and Research; University of East Anglia
- Thesis: The VA1 trigger processor and a study of jet production (1990)
- Website: metoffice.gov.uk/research/people/jonathan-gregory

Jonathan Michael Gregory FRS is a climate modeller working on mechanisms of global and large-scale change in climate and sea level on multidecadal and longer timescales at the Met Office and the University of Reading.

== Education ==
Gregory was educated at Stanborough School, Welwyn Garden City and the University of Oxford. He completed his postgraduate study at the University of Birmingham where he was awarded a Doctor of Philosophy degree in experimental particle physics in 1990 for work on the UA1 experiment at CERN.

== Career and Research ==
Gregory is currently a senior scientist in the Climate Division of the Natural Environment Research Council (NERC) National Centre for Atmospheric Science (NCAS-Climate), located in the Department of Meteorology at the University of Reading; and a research fellow in climate change at the Met Office Hadley Centre for Climate Prediction and Research.

A 2004 study, led by Gregory and published in the journal Nature, predicted that the Greenland ice sheet is likely to be eliminated as a consequence of global warming, resulting in a rise in global sea-levels by 7.1 meters over the next 1000 years or more.

He was a co-ordinating Lead Author of the 2001 IPCC Third Assessment Report chapter 11 Changes in Sea Level, and a contributing author to the sea level chapter in the IPCC Second Assessment Report". Gregory was also a co-Lead Author of the 2007 IPCC Fourth Assessment Report chapter 5 Observations: Oceanic Climate Change and Sea Level, and chapter 10 Global Climate Projections.

=== Selected publications ===
Gregory's research collaborators include Tom Wigley, Phil Jones John Mitchell. His publications include:

- Coastal and global averaged sea level rise for 1950 to 2000
- On the consistent scaling of terms in the sea ice dynamics equation
- Simulated and observed decadal variability in ocean heat content
- Threatened loss of the Greenland ice-sheet
- The role of the Atlantic freshwater balance in the hyteresis of the meridional overturning circulation
- An observationally based estimate of the climate sensitivity
- Church, J. A. and J. M. Gregory, 2001. Sea level change In: Encyclopedia of Ocean Sciences. J. H. Steele and K. K. Turekian eds. Academic Press, London
- Comparison of results from several AOGCMs for global and regional sea-level change 1900-2100

=== Awards and honours ===
In 2010 Gregory was awarded an Advanced Grant by the European Research Council (ERC) to carry out research on sea level change. In 2017 Jonathan Gregory was elected a Fellow of the Royal Society (FRS). The 2007 Nobel Peace Prize was shared by the Intergovernmental Panel on Climate Change (IPCC) and Al Gore for their work on climate change.

He has received the 2018 BBVA Foundation Frontiers of Knowledge Award in the category of Climate Change, jointly with Anny Cazenave and John A. Church for their outstanding contributions, the committee states, "to detecting, understanding and projecting the response of global and regional sea level to anthropogenic climate change."
