= Keith Abbis =

English footballer (born 1932)

Personal information
- Full name: Keith Douglas Abbis
- Date of birth: 26 April 1932 (age 94)
- Place of birth: Hatfield, England
- Position: Forward

Senior career*
Years	Team	Apps	(Gls)
195?–1957	Hitchin Town		
1957–1961	Brighton & Hove Albion	19	(3)
1961–1962	Chelmsford City		
1962–1964	Romford	70	(1)
- Brentwood Town
- * Club domestic league appearances and goals

Keith Douglas Abbis (born 26 April 1932) is an English former professional footballer who played in the Football League for Brighton & Hove Albion as a forward. He scored three league goals for Brighton, including two in a 3–2 victory over Middlesbrough in April 1960. He also played non-league football for clubs including Hitchin Town, Chelmsford City, Romford and Brentwood Town.
