= Cosby Smallpeice =

English engineer

Cosby Donald Philipps Smallpeice (23 March 1896 – 1977) was an English engineer involved in design of precision and production lathes, and pneumatic tools and hoists. He created the company Martonair, and on its flotation in 1966 he founded The Smallpeice Trust to provide opportunities for engineering students. Much of the history of Cosby Smallpeice is covered in a publication by The Smallpeice Trust titled "A Smallpeice of History", which documents the history of the founder, the trust, and its ongoing training programmes.

Born the son of William and Cicely Smallpeice on 23 March 1896 in London he grew up in Felsted where he attended Felsted School. At the outbreak of War in 1914 he enlisted in the Royal Army Service Corps and attained the rank of captain by the time he was severely gassed in 1917. In the year he spent recovering he taught himself technical drawing and in 1919 entered the profession as C Smallpeice, General Engineer, having rented a corrugated iron shed in Sawbridgeworth with a 14-year-old lad as assistant.

== From small beginnings ==
While in Sawbridgeworth, Cosby married Josephine Collins, the daughter of a local doctor. In the 1920s Cosby was frustrated by poor quality lathes available and resolved to produce his own design for a cheap but effective production lathe with pneumatically actuated headstock and tailstock and its own electric drive. In 1929 he was trading as Smallpeice Ltd, and moved the company to Foleshill Rd, Coventry where he shared premises with Cromwell Engineering. The collaboration allowed the production in 1929 of the Smallpeice Multicut production lathe. There was also a precision lathe marketed under the Cromwell name, and Smallpeice continued in the development of pneumatic aids to production, and apart from premises in Mile Lane in Coventry he had a drawing office in the village of Marton.

== War Years ==
Production lathes were of key importance in the war years, however on 14 November 1940 the Smallpeice and Cromwell factories in Coventry were completely destroyed by a large air-raid. Production of the Multicut lathe was resumed by a relationship with Alfred Herbert Ltd, as the Herbert-Smallpeice Lathe. While, in the village of Marton, work continued on pneumatic devices, and the company Martonair was formed. A new product, the Martonair pneumatic hoist, found a strong market in wartime factories due to the large proportion of women involved in production. In 1941 the head office was moved to a disused dance hall in Parkshot near Richmond, Surrey. While Martonair thrived, Cosby was working on a new precision lathe, something now in short supply. The design was put out to tender in December 1944, and the first lathe was produced for Smallpeice Ltd by J Evans & Sons of Portsmouth in October 1945 (though at the time they were in Frome, where they had been relocated during the war).

== Post-war ==
The new Smallpeice lathe was advertised as the Cromwell S.S. & S.C. 3.5" x 19" Super-Precision Model S.800. At £448 in 1947, it was a very expensive lathe, and was built to very high-standards with many novel features, including a Ward Leonard drive system to allow precise control of speed. A total of 350 of these precision lathes were produced by J Evans up to about 1955, and J Evans were also involved in the production of some post-war Multicut lathes.

Martonair continued very successfully with pneumatic systems, and built a new factory in Feltham, Middlesex. In 1966 the company was floated on the stock market, allowing Cosby to found The Smallpeice Trust, and to retire and enjoy his sailing yacht.
