= Welwyn Garden City Hockey Club =

English field hockey club

WGC Hockey Club
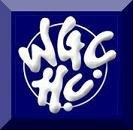
- Full name: Welwyn Garden City Hockey Club
- Nickname(s): Blues
- Founded: 1921
- Ground: De Havilland Sports Village, Hatfield, Hertfordshire
- Chairman: Cass Khan
- President: Chris Perry
- League: Men's 1s: Men's East League Division 3SW; Women's 1s: Women's East League Division 2SW

Welwyn Garden City Hockey Club are a field hockey club based in Hatfield, Hertfordshire, England. Established in 1921, the club celebrated its 100th anniversary in 2022. The club has both men's and women's hockey teams. They train and play on the astroturf pitch at the University of Hertfordshire's De Havilland Sport Village.

== Club ==
The club have eight adults teams, all playing in the East Hockey League system. The club have also a very strong junior section called Welwyn Wasps. The club's main ambitions are to win leagues, develop players to their full potential, and also to let the players enjoy themselves when they train or play.

Welwyn Garden City's current kit suppliers are Dita Field Hockey and they are currently without a shirt sponsor this season, they were sponsored by agency Key People before the 2009–2010 season.

== Men's teams ==
=== Season 2009–10 ===
- WGC Men's 1st XI: East League Division 3SW
- WGC Men's 2nd XI: East League Division 5SW
- WGC Men's 3rd XI: East League Division 6SW
- WGC Men's 4th XI: East League Division 7SW

== Ladies' teams ==
- WGC Ladies' 1st East Women's League Division 2SW
- WGC Ladies' 2nd East Women's League Division 3SW
- WGC Ladies' 3rd East Women' League Division 6SW
- WGC Ladies' 4th East Women's League Division 7SW
