= Hatfield, Hertfordshire =

Town in Hertfordshire, England

Coordinates: 51°45′49″N 00°13′33″W

Hatfield
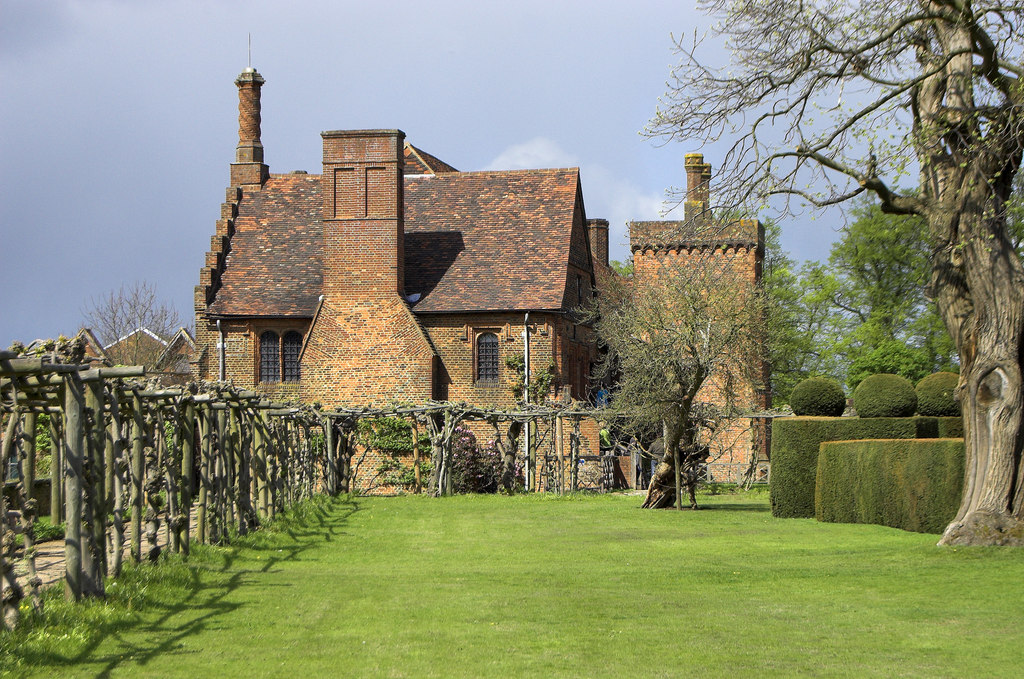
- The Old Palace at Hatfield House

- Location within Hertfordshire
- Population: 41,265 (2021 census)
- OS grid reference: TL2308
- Civil parish: Hatfield
- District: Welwyn Hatfield
- Shire county: Hertfordshire
- Region: East
- Country: England
- Sovereign state: United Kingdom
- Post town: HATFIELD
- Postcode district: AL9, AL10
- Dialling code: 01707
- Police: Hertfordshire
- Fire: Hertfordshire
- Ambulance: East of England
- UK Parliament: Welwyn Hatfield

Hatfield is a town and civil parish in Hertfordshire, England, in the borough of Welwyn Hatfield. It had a population of 29,616 in 2001, 39,201 at the 2011 census, and 41,265 at the 2021 census. The settlement is of Saxon origin. Hatfield House, home of the Marquess of Salisbury, forms the nucleus of the old town. From the 1930s when de Havilland opened a factory, until the 1990s when British Aerospace closed it, aircraft design and manufacture employed more people there than any other industry. Hatfield was one of the post-war New Towns built around London and has much modernist architecture from the period. The University of Hertfordshire is based there.

Hatfield lies 20 miles (30 kilometres) north of London beside the A1(M) motorway and has direct trains to London King's Cross railway station, London St Pancras railway station, Finsbury Park and Moorgate. There has been a strong increase in commuters who work in London moving into the area.

In 2022, TV property expert Phil Spencer named Hatfield as the second best place to live for regular commuters to London, based on train times, house prices and the attractions the town has. In 2024, World Bucket List named Hatfield as the fifth most boring place in the world.

== History ==
The name Hatfield derives from the Old English hǣðfeld meaning 'heath field'.

In the early tenth century Hatfield belonged to a vir potens (powerful man) called Ordmær and his wife Ealde, who may have been the grandfather of King Edward the Martyr. Sometime between 932 and 956 he exchanged the town for land in Devon with Æthelstan Half-King, who then gave it to his sons. King Edgar seized the land when he became king on 959, claiming that Ordmær and Ealde had bequeathed it to him, but Æthelstan's sons recovered it after Edgar died. Hatfield is recorded in Domesday Book of 1086 as the property of the Abbey of Ely, and unusually the original census data that compilers of Domesday used survives, giving us slightly more information than in the final Domesday record. No other records remain until 1226, when Henry III granted the Bishops of Ely rights to an annual four-day fair and a weekly market. The town was then called Bishop's Hatfield.

Hatfield House is the seat of the Cecil family, the Marquesses of Salisbury. Elizabeth Tudor was confined there for three years in what is now known as The Old Palace in Hatfield Park. Legend has it that she was informed of her accession as queen in 1558 while resting under an oak tree in the park. She presided over her first Council in the Great Hall (The Old Palace) of Hatfield. In 1851 the route of the Great North Road (now the A1000) was altered to avoid cutting through the grounds of Hatfield House.

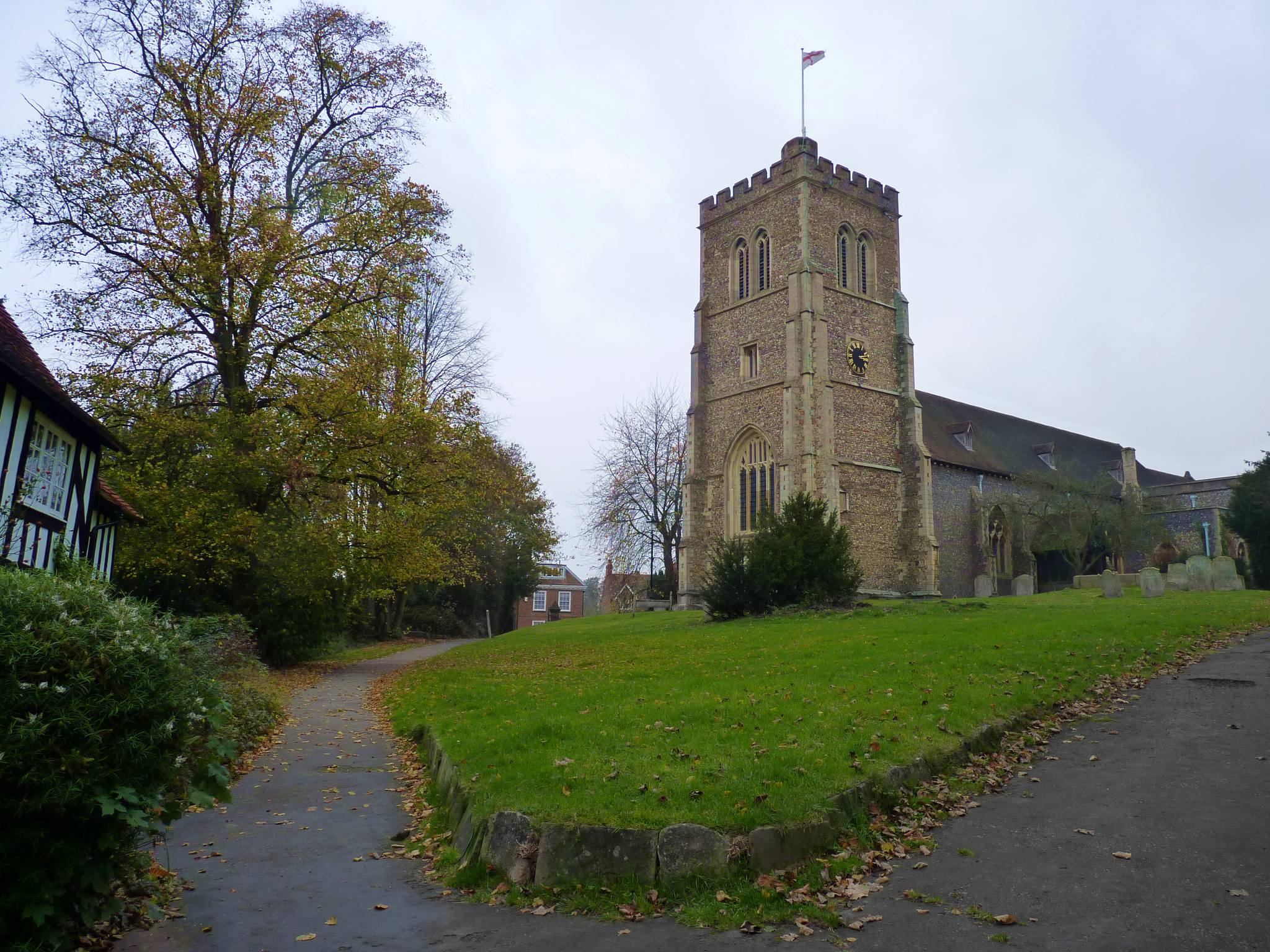
St Etheldreda's Church in Old Hatfield.

The town grew up around the gates of Hatfield House. Old Hatfield retains many historic buildings, notably the Old Palace, St Etheldreda's Church and Hatfield House. The Old Palace was built by the Bishop of Ely, Cardinal Morton, in 1497, during the reign of Henry VII, and the only surviving wing is still used today for Elizabethan-style banquets.

St Etheldreda's Church was founded by the monks from Ely, and the first wooden church, built in 1285, was probably sited where the existing building stands overlooking the old town.

The church of St Etheldreda, well situated towards the top of the hill, contains an Early English round arch with dog-tooth moulding, but for the rest is Decorated and Perpendicular and largely restored. The chapel north of the chancel is known as the Salisbury chapel and was erected by Robert Cecil, 1st Earl of Salisbury, who was buried here. It is in a combination of classic and Gothic styles. In a private portion of the churchyard is buried, among others of the family, Robert Gascoyne-Cecil, 3rd Marquess of Salisbury.

=== Aerospace industry ===
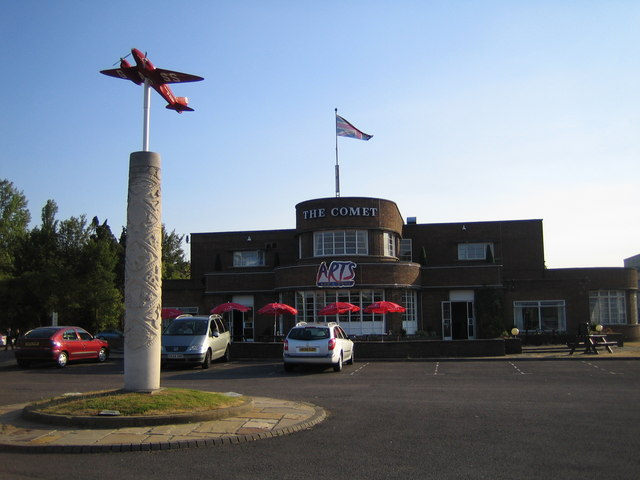
The Comet; the carving of the pillar is by Eric Kennington; the aircraft is not the original

In 1930 the de Havilland airfield and aircraft factory was opened at Hatfield and by 1949 it had become the largest employer in the town, with almost 4,000 staff. It was taken over by Hawker Siddeley in 1960 and merged into British Aerospace in 1978. In the 1930s it produced a range of small biplanes. During the Second World War it produced the Mosquito fighter bomber and developed the Vampire, the second British production jet aircraft after the Gloster Meteor. After the war, facilities were expanded and it developed the Comet airliner (the world's first production jet liner), the Trident airliner, and an early bizjet, the DH125.

British Aerospace closed the Hatfield site in 1993 having moved the BAe 146 production line to Woodford Aerodrome. The land was used as a film set for Steven Spielberg's movie Saving Private Ryan and most of the BBC/HBO television drama Band of Brothers. It was later developed for housing, higher education, commerce and retail.

Today, Hatfield's aviation history is remembered by the names of certain local streets and pubs (e. g. Comet Way, The Airfield, Dragon Road) as well as The Comet Hotel (now owned by Ramada) built in the 1930s. The Harrier Pub (formerly The Hilltop) is actually named after the Harrier bird, not the aircraft, hence the original pub sign showing the bird. The de Havilland Aircraft Heritage Centre, at Salisbury Hall in nearby London Colney, preserves and displays many historic de Havilland aeroplanes and related archives.

=== New Town ===
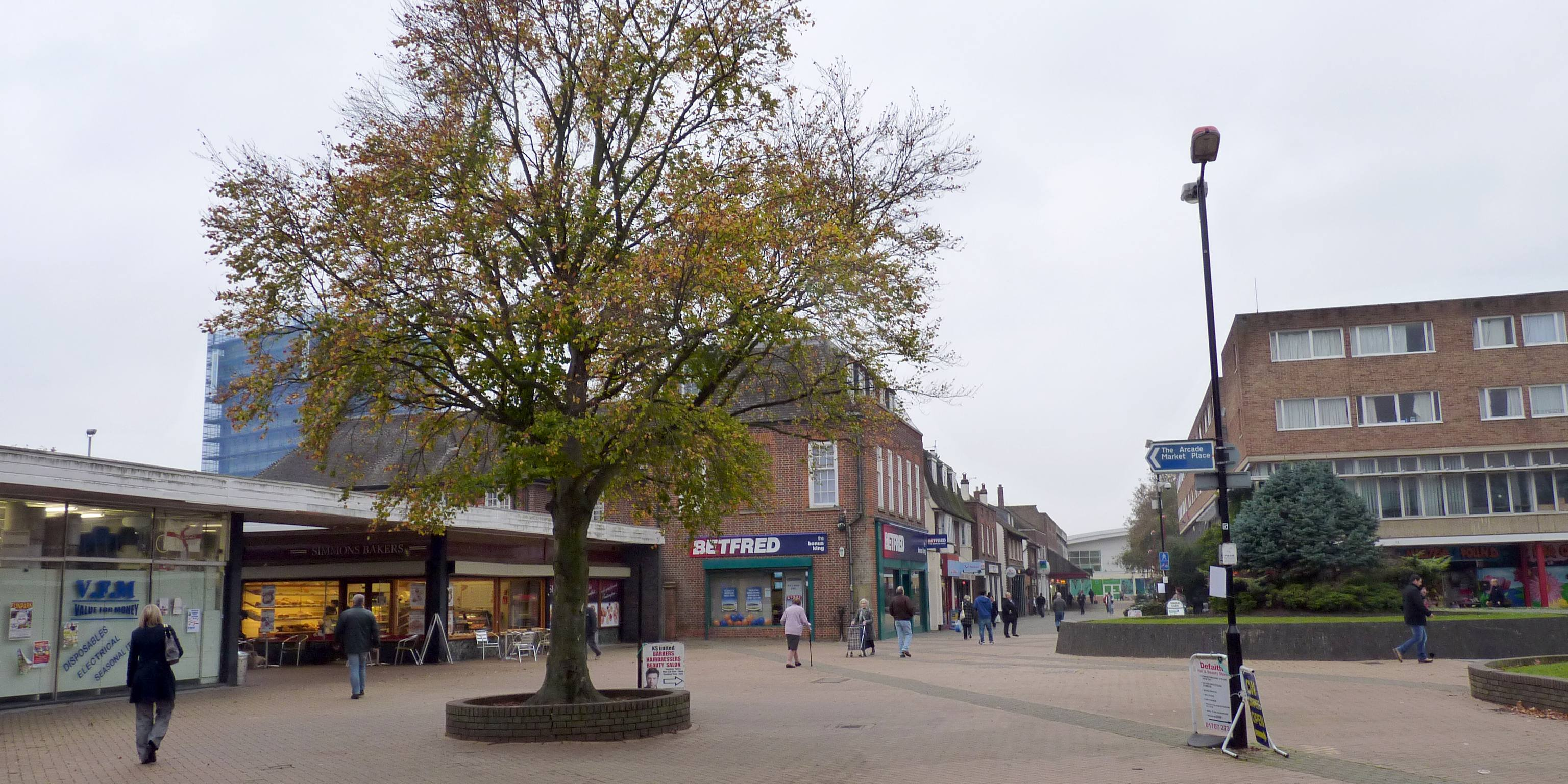
Hatfield New Town centre, looking west along its axis.

The Abercrombie Plan for London in 1944 proposed a New Town in Hatfield. It was designated in the New Towns Act 1946 (9 & 10 Geo. 6. c. 68), forming part of the initial Hertfordshire group with nearby Stevenage, Welwyn Garden City and Hemel Hempstead. The Government allocated 2,340 acres (9.5 km^{2}) for Hatfield New Town, with a population target of 25,000. (By 2001 the population had reached 27,833.) The Hatfield Development Corporation, tasked with creating the New Town, chose to build a new town centre, rejecting Old Hatfield because it was on the wrong side of the railway, without space for expansion and "with its intimate village character, out of scale with the town it would have to serve." They chose instead St Albans Road on the town's east–west bus route. A road pattern was planned that offered no temptation to through traffic to take short cuts through the town and which enabled local traffic to move rapidly.

Hatfield retains New Town characteristics, including much modernist architecture of the 1950s and the trees and open spaces that were outlined in the original design. As of 2017, a redevelopment of the town centre was planned.

== Governance ==
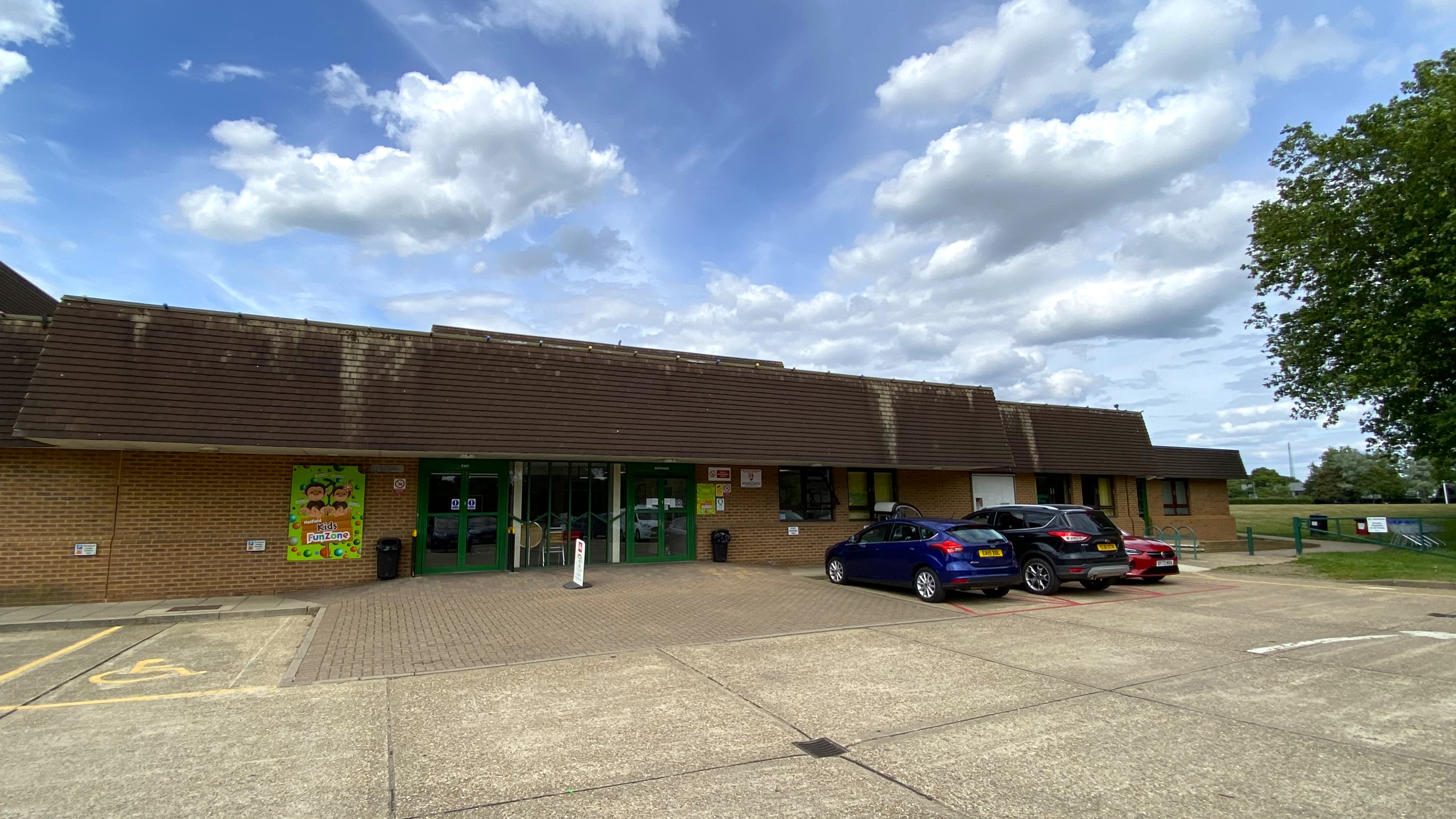
Birchwood Leisure Centre: Combined leisure centre and headquarters of town council.

There are three tiers of local government covering Hatfield, at parish, district and county level: Hatfield Town Council, Welwyn Hatfield Borough Council and Hertfordshire County Council. Hatfield Town Council has its offices and meeting place at the Birchwood Leisure Centre on Longmead. Hatfield town council is currently under a Labour administration.

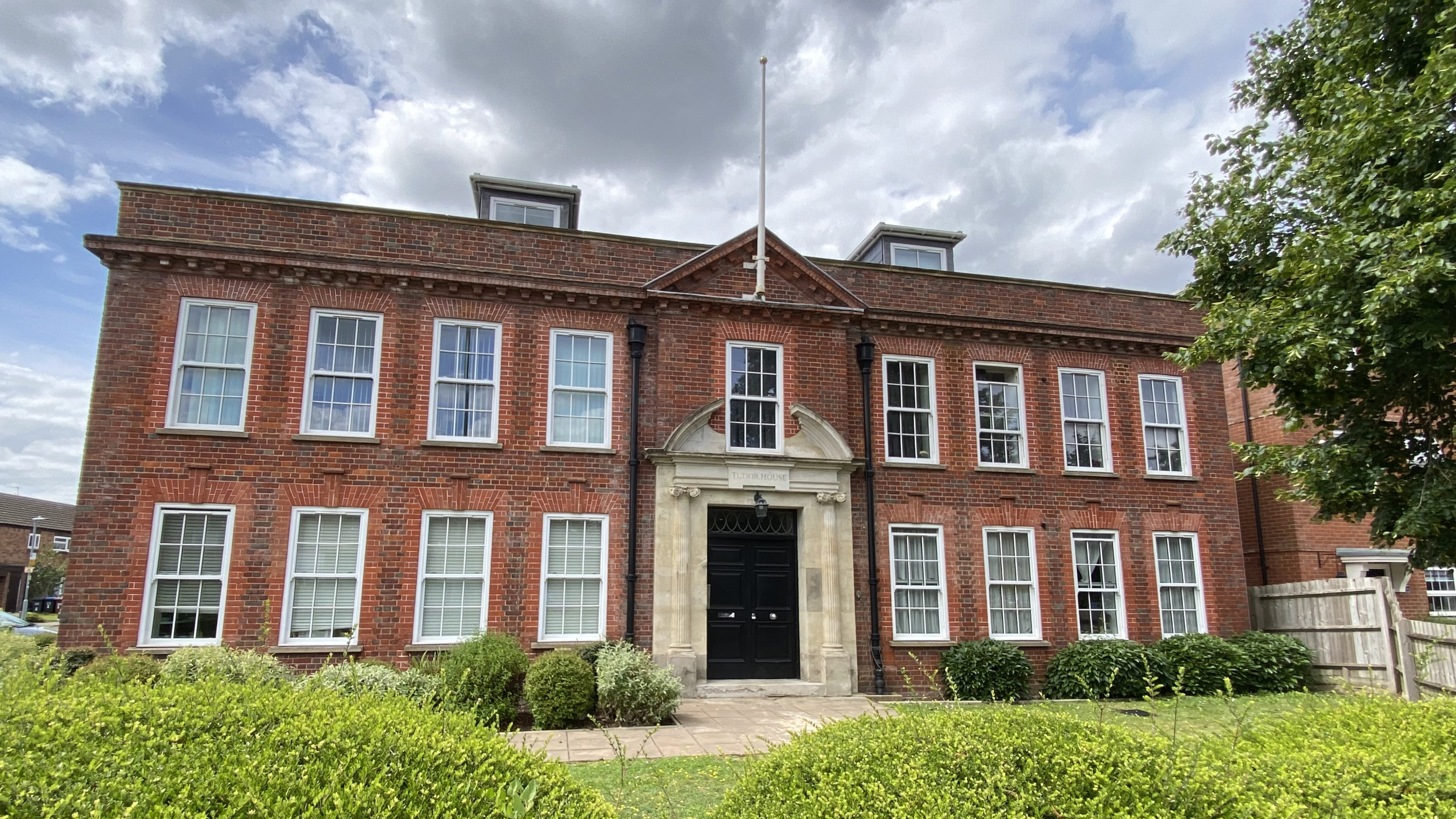
Old council offices, 16 St Albans Road East

From 1894 until 1974 the lower two tiers of local government were Hatfield Parish Council and Hatfield Rural District Council. The rural district council built itself a headquarters at 16 St Albans Road East in 1930. The rural district council was abolished in 1974 and its powers transferred to Welwyn Hatfield.

Hatfield is twinned with the Dutch port town of Zierikzee. Hatfield is part of the Welwyn Hatfield constituency, which also includes Welwyn Garden City. The member of parliament (MP) for Welwyn Hatfield is Andrew Lewin, of the Labour Party.

== Sport ==
Hatfield Town F.C. plays Non-League football at Gosling Sports Park. The Welwyn Garden City Hockey Club are a field hockey club based in Hatfield.

Hatfield Athletic Football Club competes in the Herts Senior County League and plays its games at Lemsford.

The town has a public swimming pool and four sports/leisure centres (two with indoor swimming pools).

== Climate ==
Hatfield experiences an oceanic climate (Köppen climate classification Cfb) like most of the United Kingdom.

Climate data for Hatfield
Month	Jan	Feb	Mar	Apr	May	Jun	Jul	Aug	Sep	Oct	Nov	Dec	Year
Mean daily maximum °C (°F)	8 (46)	9 (48)	12 (54)	14 (57)	18 (64)	21 (70)	23 (73)	23 (73)	20 (68)	16 (61)	11 (52)	8 (46)	15 (59)
Mean daily minimum °C (°F)	5 (41)	5 (41)	6 (43)	8 (46)	10 (50)	13 (55)	15 (59)	16 (61)	13 (55)	11 (52)	8 (46)	5 (41)	10 (50)
Average precipitation mm (inches)	50.7 (2.00)	39.9 (1.57)	31.7 (1.25)	46.2 (1.82)	38.9 (1.53)	46.4 (1.83)	33.1 (1.30)	43.6 (1.72)	49.7 (1.96)	70.7 (2.78)	58.1 (2.29)	56.9 (2.24)	565.9 (22.28)

== Culture and recreation ==
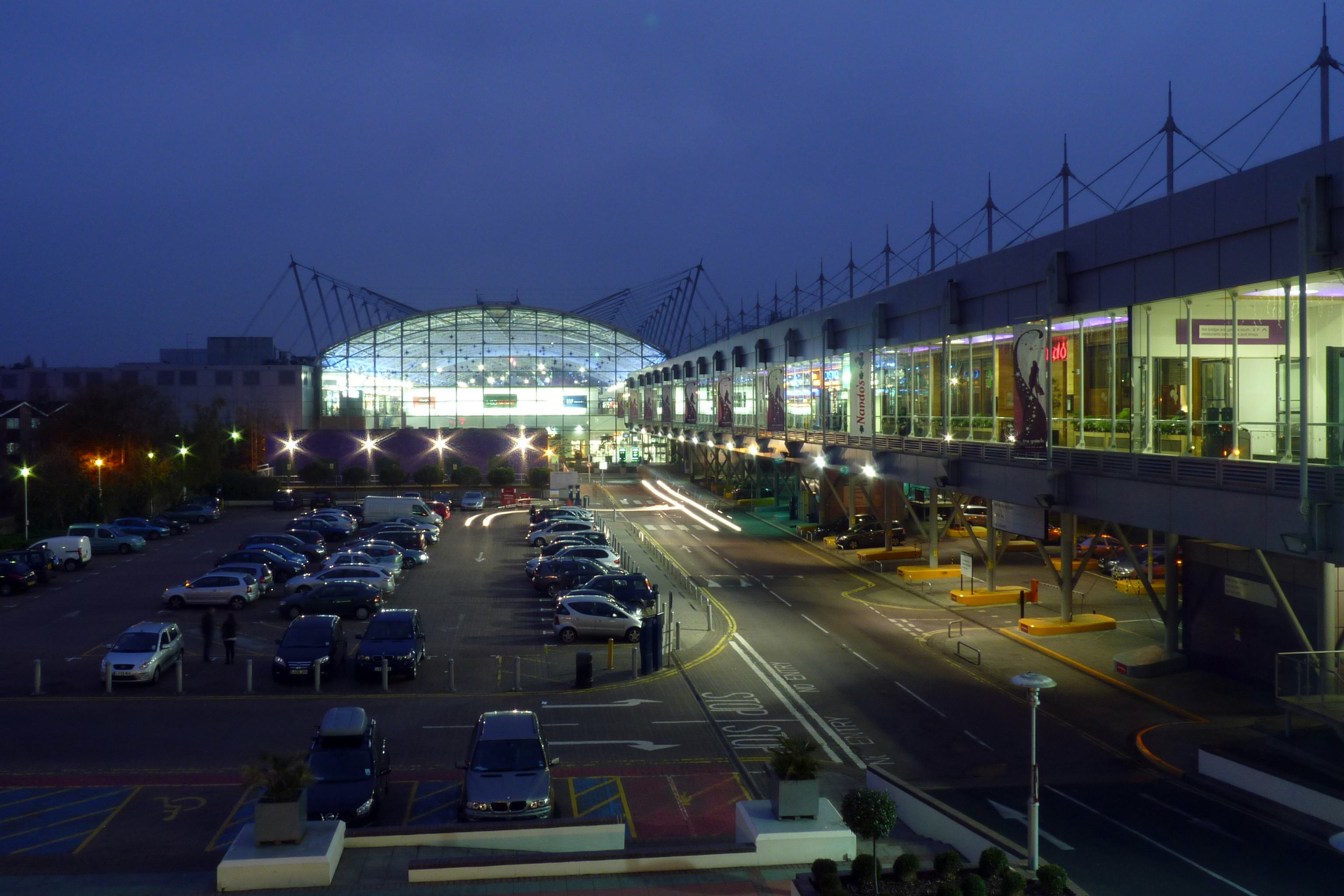
The south wing of The Galleria with the connecting bridge on the right of the photograph, viewed from its north wing.

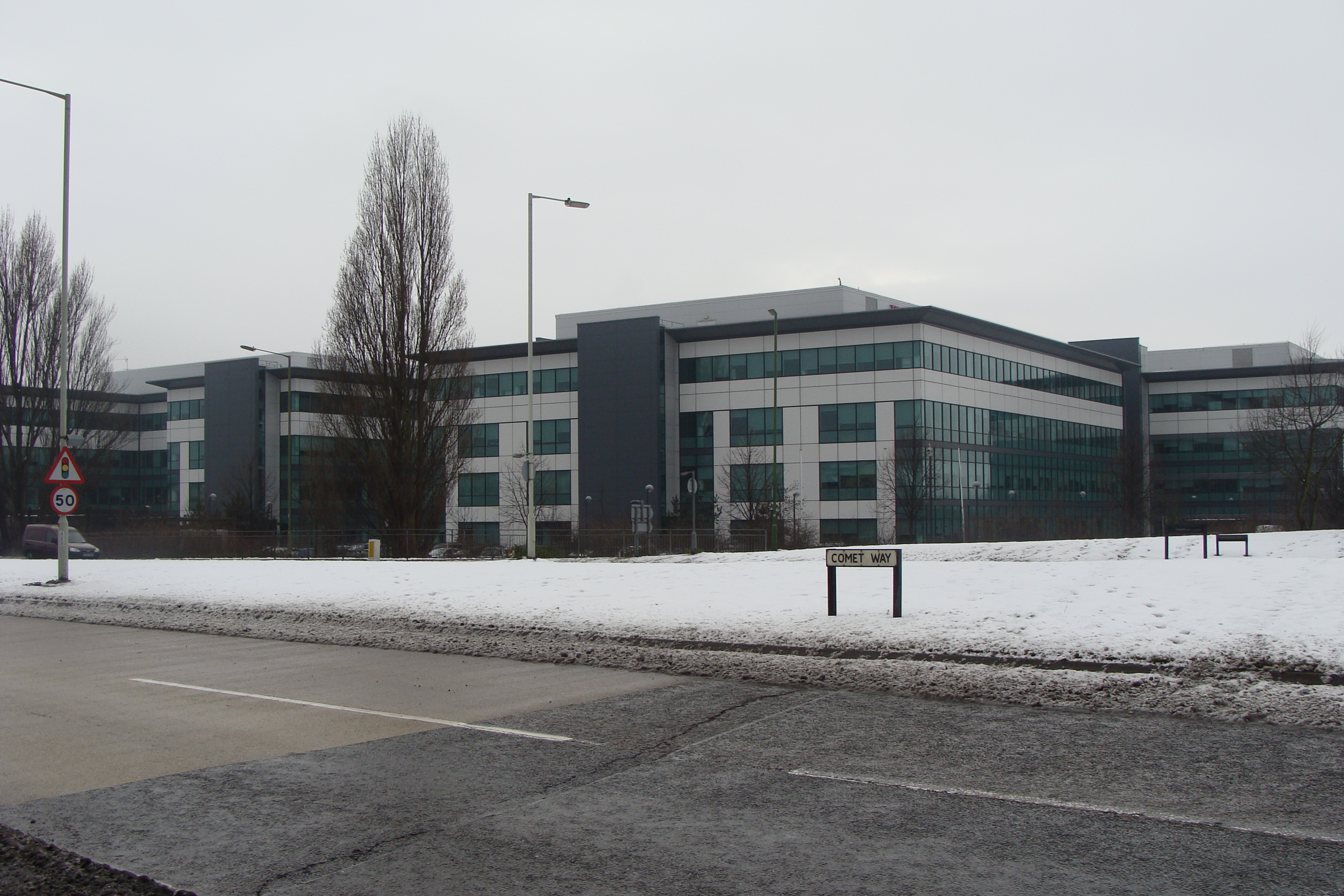
EE Head Office in Hatfield Business Park.

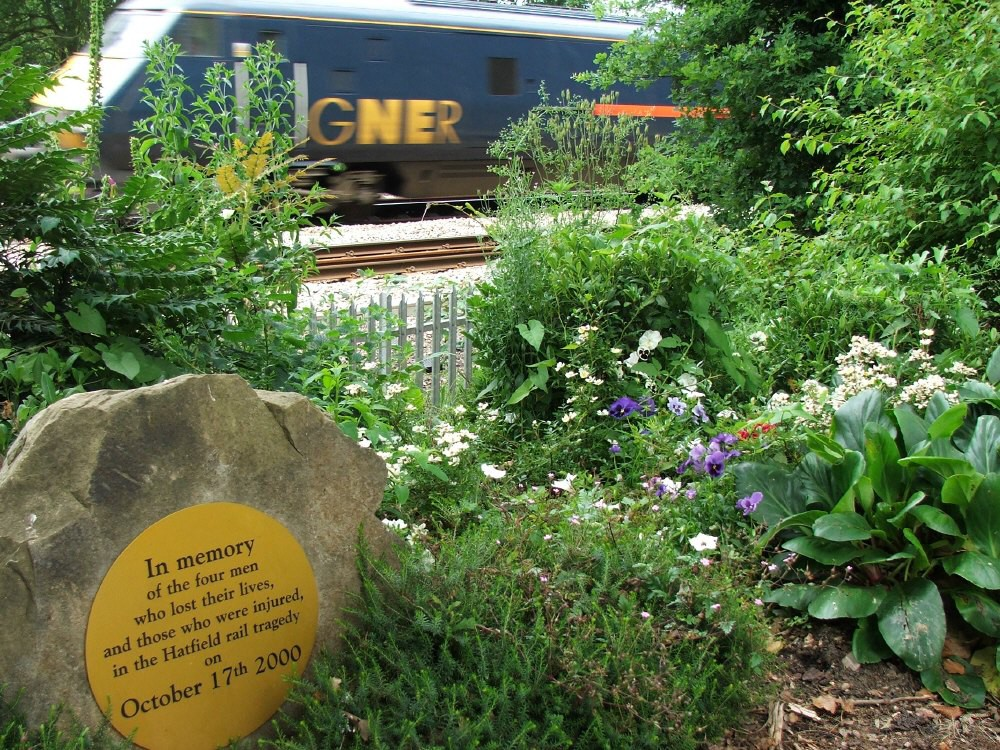
The memorial garden built alongside the East Coast Main Line.

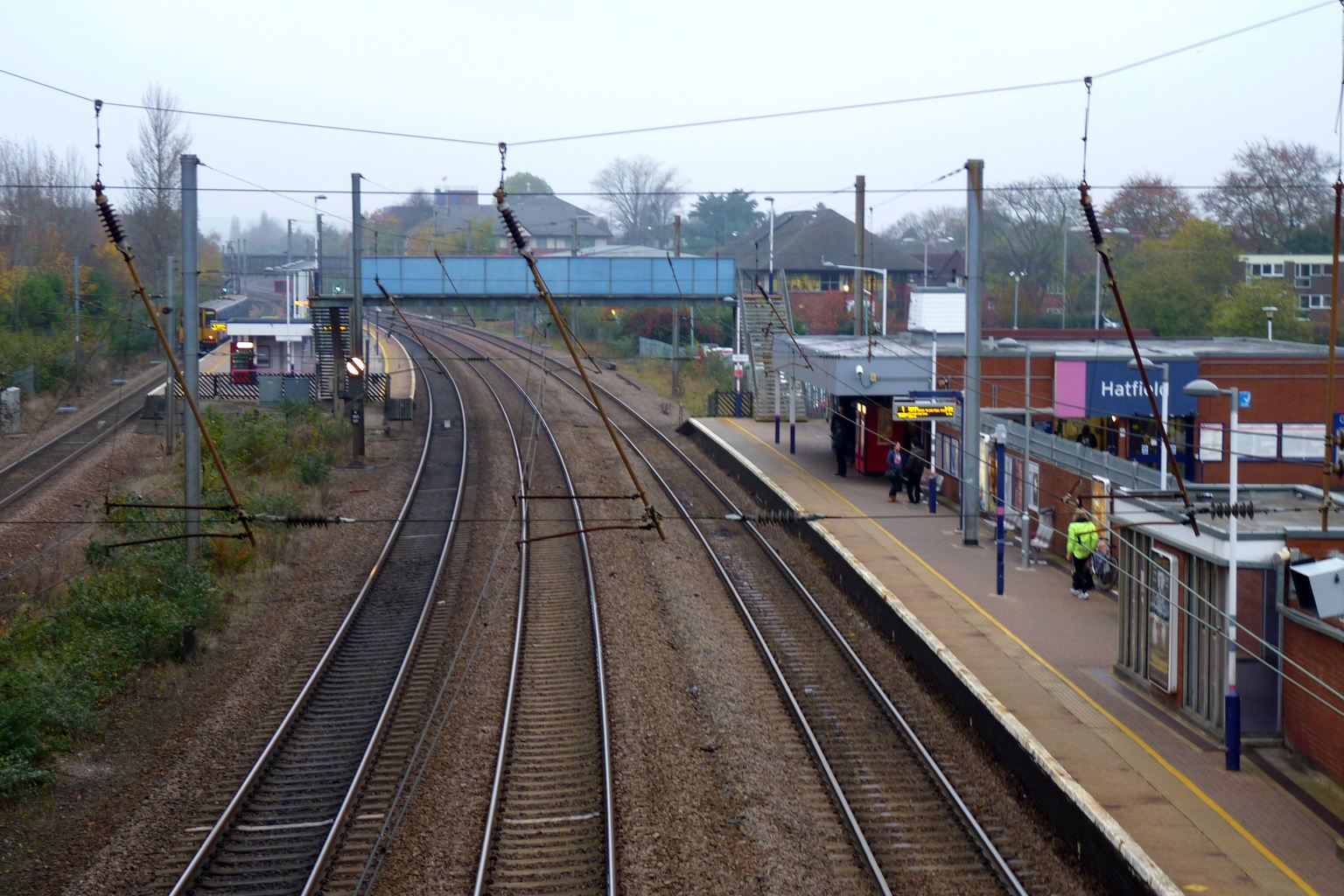
Hatfield railway station viewed from the public footbridge.

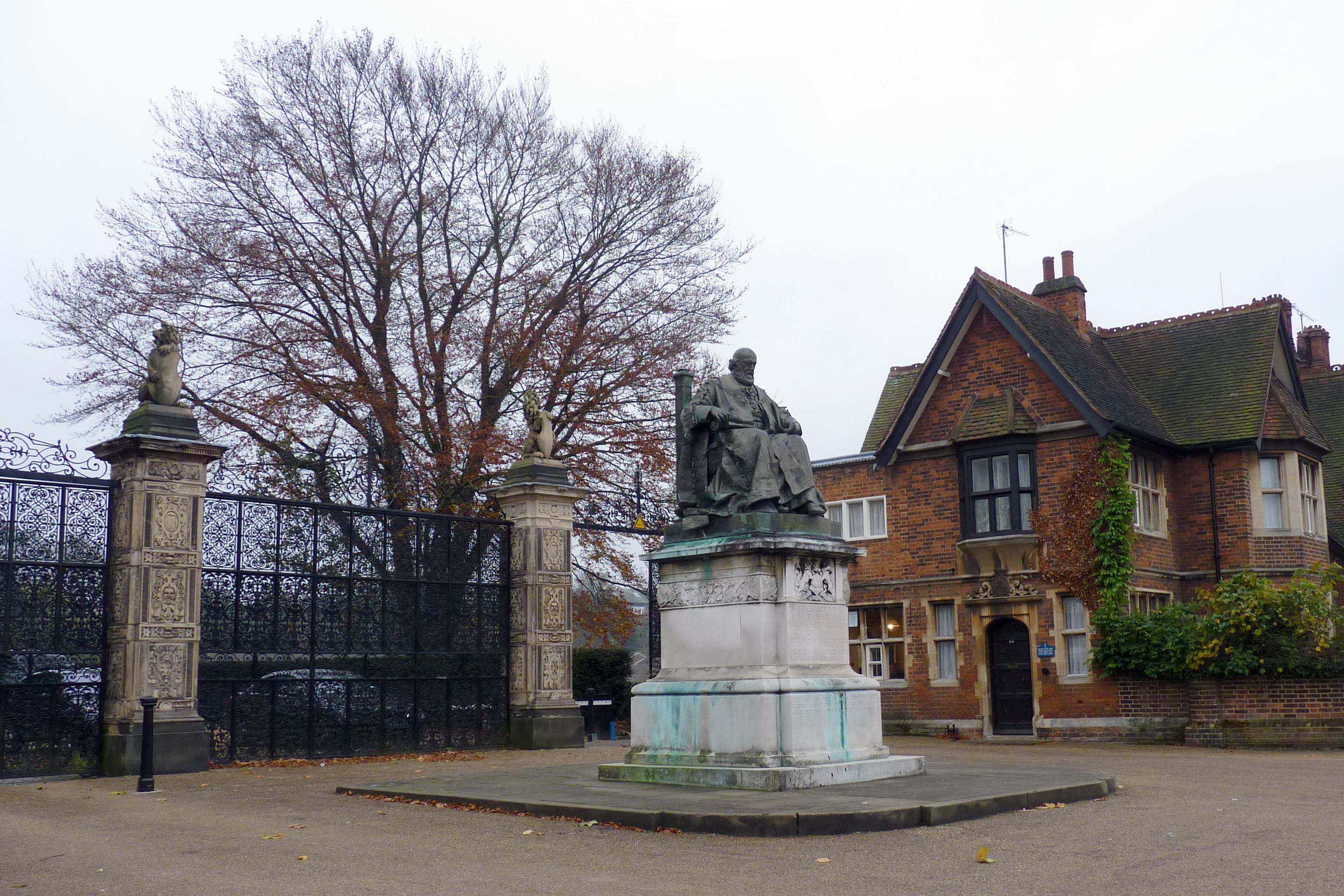
Statue of Robert Gascoyne-Cecil, 3rd Marquess of Salisbury in front of the park gates of Hatfield House.

Hatfield has a nine-screen Odeon cinema, a stately home (Hatfield House), a museum (Mill Green Museum), a contemporary art gallery (Art and Design Gallery), a theatre (The Weston Auditorium) and a music venue (The Forum Hertfordshire). There are shopping centres in the new town: the Galleria (indoor shopping centre), The Stable Yard (Hatfield House), and three supermarkets (ASDA, ALDI and Tesco). In 2022, Hatfield held its first vegan market, an event held in a number of English towns, at Hatfield House and now holds the market each June and November. During Veganuary in 2023, students at the University of Hertfordshire organized their own vegan market.

== Education ==
Hatfield contains numerous primary and secondary schools, including St Philip Howard Catholic Primary School, Howe Dell Primary School, Countess Anne School, Onslow St Audrey's School, Bishop's Hatfield Girls' School and the independent day and private boarding girls' school Queenswood School (only to name a few).

In addition to the important areas in the town, the University of Hertfordshire is also included by many. A large section of the airfield site was purchased by the university and the £120-million de Havilland Campus, incorporating a £15-million Sports Village, was opened in September 2003. The university has closed its sites at Watford and Hertford; faculties situated there have been moved to the de Havilland Campus.

The equine branch of the Royal Veterinary College is based in Hatfield.

== Places of interest ==
- Hatfield House
- Hatfield War Memorial
- The Forum Hertfordshire (music venue) University of Hertfordshire. In 2011, the music video for Ed Sheeran's Lego House, featuring Harry Potter's Rupert Grint, was filmed in Hatfield. Filming took place at The Forum venue, located on University of Hertfordshire, College Lane campus. Filming of the video took place during Sheeran's performance at the venue on 8 October 2011. Many students were involved during filming, as they made up most of the audience at the Forum that day.
- Mill Green Museum and watermill
- Art and Design Gallery (contemporary art gallery) University of Hertfordshire
- The Weston Auditorium (theatre and cinema) University of Hertfordshire
- The Galleria
- Hatfield Business Park, the former de Havilland plant, later BAE Systems Hatfield, was used as a location for Saving Private Ryan (film) and Band of Brothers (TV series).

== Transport ==
Hatfield is 20 miles (32 km) to the north of London. It is 14 miles (23 km) from London Luton Airport. The A1(M) runs through a tunnel beneath the town, which is also close to the M25.

In the eighteenth and nineteenth centuries it was the northern terminus of the Hatfield and Reading Turnpike that allowed travelers from the north to continue their journey to the west without going through the congestion of London.

The East Coast railway line from London to York runs through the town, separating the old and new parts. A commuter service connects Hatfield railway station to London King's Cross. A new railway station and car park opened in late 2015. The frequent train service runs direct from Hatfield Station to London King's Cross (21 minutes) via Finsbury Park (16 minutes, Victoria Underground Line) on fast trains running two or three times an hour. An additional train service calls at all stations to Moorgate in the City of London.

Hatfield is well served by buses with regular services to all nearby towns and villages and as far as north London. Bus services are run by Uno, Arriva and Centrebus who are all part of the local Intalink Partnership.

The Hatfield rail crash occurred in October 2000, which brought track-maintenance deficiencies to public attention. A garden beside the East Coast Main Line was built as a memorial to the crash victims.

== Local media ==
The local TV stations are BBC London & ITV London, received from the Crystal Palace TV transmitter and the Hemel Hempstead relay transmitter. BBC East and ITV Anglia are also received from the Sandy Heath TV transmitter.

Local radio stations are BBC Three Counties Radio on 90.4 FM, Heart Hertfordshire on 106.9 and Radio Verulam on 92.6 FM.

The Welwyn Hatfield Times is the town's local weekly newspaper.

== Notable residents ==
=== Business ===
- Michael Birch (born 1970), founder of the social network BEBO, lived in Hatfield.
- Geoffrey de Havilland (1882–1965), founder of De Havilland Aircraft Company
- Jack Olding (Henry John Douglas Olding, fl. mid-20th c.), wartime tank and tractor importer, came from Hatfield.

=== Music and dance ===
- Babe Ruth, a 1970s rock band, came from Hatfield.
- Colin Blunstone (born 1945), of the Zombies lived in Hatfield.
- Martin Carthy (born 1941), folk musician, was born in Hatfield.
- Sandra Conley (born 1943), principal dancer with the Royal Ballet.
- Donovan (born 1946), folk musician, moved to Hatfield at the age of 10 and spent the rest of his childhood there.
- Barbara Gaskin (born 1950), pop singer, No. 1 with "It's My Party".
- George Martin (1926–2016), record producer for the Beatles, lived in Hatfield in the 1950s.
- Alan Shacklock (born 1950), pop musician and record producer, lived in Hatfield.
- Sal Solo (Christopher Scott Stevens, born 1961), rock singer, was born in Hatfield.
- Mick Taylor (born 1949), Rolling Stones guitarist 1969–1974, grew up in Hatfield.
- Tracey Thorn (born 1962), lead singer of Everything But The Girl, was born in Hatfield, and attended Bishop's Hatfield Girls' School.

=== Politics, nobility and royalty ===
- Robert Cecil, 1st Earl of Salisbury (c. 1563–1612), statesman
- Robert Cecil, 3rd Marquess of Salisbury (1830–1903), Conservative politician, lived at Hatfield House and was buried at St Etheldreda Church.
- Robert Gascoyne-Cecil, 5th Marquess of Salisbury (1893–1972), Conservative politician
- William Lamb, 2nd Viscount Melbourne (1779–1848), prime minister, was buried at St Etheldreda Church.
- Henry John Temple, 3rd Viscount Palmerston (1784–1865), prime minister
- Elizabeth Tudor (1533–1603), future queen, lived at Hatfield House (Hatfield Old Palace)
- Malcolm Wicks (1947–2012), Labour Party politician and Minister for Energy, was born in Hatfield.

=== Religion ===
- Walter Curle (1575–1647), Bishop of Winchester and a close supporter of William Laud, was born in Hatfield.
- John Morton (c. 1420–1500), Cardinal and Bishop of Ely, built Hatfield Old Palace.

=== Science and scholarship ===
- L. H. Sumanadasa (1910–1986), aviator and university founder, learned to fly at Hatfield.
- John Tradescant the elder (c. 1570s–1638), botanist, gardener and naturalist, was head gardener at Hatfield House
- Michael Ventris (1922–1956), deciphered Linear B script, died in Hatfield in a motor accident

=== Sports ===
- Keith Abbis (born 1932), Brighton and Hove Albion footballer
- Samir Carruthers (born 1993), Sheffield United footballer, lived in Hatfield.
- Matthew Connolly (born 1987), QPR defender, lived and attended primary school in Hatfield.
- Iain Dowie (born 1965), West Ham player, QPR manager & BBC pundit, was born and raised in Hatfield and studied mechanical engineering at the University of Hertfordshire.
- Valentine Faithfull (1820–1894), first-class cricketer and clergyman, was born in Hatfield.
- Rodney Marsh (born 1944), QPR footballer, is from Hatfield.
- Francis Pember (1862–1954), first-class cricketer, was born in Hatfield.
- Billy Joe Saunders (born 1989), WBO middleweight world champion boxer
- Korey Smith (born 1991) Bristol City footballer was born and grew up in Hatfield

=== Stage, media and film ===
- Sanjeev Bhaskar (born 1963), comedian and broadcaster, lived in Hatfield whilst studying at Hatfield Polytechnic.
- John Cazabon (1914–1983), actor on stage, screen and radio, was born in Hatfield.
- Pippa Haywood (born 1961), television, stage and radio actress, was born in Hatfield.
- Diane-Louise Jordan (born 1960), television presenter, grew up in Hatfield.
- David Kossoff (1919–2005), broadcaster and father of Paul Kossoff of the 1960s rock band Free, lived in Hatfield.
- Derek Martin (born 1933), actor known especially for role of Charlie Slater in EastEnders
- Gerry Northam (born 1947), radio presenter and investigative journalist, was born in Hatfield.
- Guy Ritchie (born 1968), film director famous for Snatch and Lock, Stock and Two Smoking Barrels, was born in Hatfield.
- Letitia Dean, born in Hatfield.

=== Writing ===
- Moniza Alvi (born 1954), poet and writer, grew up in Hatfield.
- Barbara Cartland (1901–2000), author of romances, lived in Hatfield.
- Geoffrey Drage (1860–1955), non-fiction writer and politician, was born in Hatfield.
- Nathaniel Lee (c. 1653–1692), poet and playwright, was born in Hatfield, where his father was rector.

== Nearby towns and villages ==
- Bell Bar
- Borehamwood
- Brookmans Park
- Colney Heath
- Hertford
- Lemsford, village within Hatfield civil parish
- Letty Green
- London Colney
- Newgate Street, village within Hatfield civil parish
- Potters Bar
- St Albans
- Stevenage
- Watford
- Welham Green
- Welwyn Garden City

== See also ==
- Council of Hatfield
- Hatfield travel guide from Wikivoyage
