= Arkwright Scholarship =

Engineering award

Arkwright Engineering Scholarships
- Founded: 1991
- Type: Non-Profit Educational Organisation
- Purpose: Engineering & Technical Design
- Region served: United Kingdom
- Product: Engineering scholarships for selected students studying 'A' levels, Scottish Highers and International Baccalaureate
- Parent organization: Smallpeice Trust
- Website: www.arkwright.org.uk

The Arkwright Engineering Scholarship is an engineering award given to engineering students within the United Kingdom and Channel Islands. It has been running since 1991 and, as part of The Smallpeice Trust, has awarded over 6,000 scholarships to date. Arkwright is the largest and most prestigious Scholarship scheme of its type in the UK. The scholarship is named after Sir Richard Arkwright, an 18th-century industrialist and inventor, often credited with being one of the founding figures of the Industrial Revolution.

== Selection ==
The scholarships are awarded through rigorous selection to the highest-calibre students from all educational backgrounds to support them through their A Levels, Scottish Highers or International Baccalaureate. Students apply during year 11 (England and Wales), S4 (Scotland) and year 12 (Northern Ireland) before taking their GCSE or Scottish [National 5] Standard Grade exams. Scholarships begin at the start of year 12 (England & Wales) / S5 (Scotland) / year 13 (NI). Scholarships consist of an annual financial award to the Scholar and to their school, and a range of enrichment activities that increase a Scholar's understanding of their chosen field of engineering, such as mentoring and industry visits. The scholars are encouraged to study engineering, and the most common destinations for scholars are the University of Cambridge, Loughborough University and Imperial College London (in order).

== Eligibility ==
=== Selection process ===
To be awarded an Arkwright Engineering Scholarship, student applicants must go through a three-stage selection process. The first stage is an extended online application form, where students have to describe a technical project they have done and explain how engineering is an interest in their lives. This online application must include a reference from a relevant teacher at the applicant's school. Stage two has been updated for 2024/5 candidates and is now an online aptitude test. The final stage is an interview hosted online

=== Trust & sponsors ===
Arkwright Engineering Scholarships are a programme of The Smallpeice Trust. The Smallpeice Trust is an independent charity that provides programmes to promote engineering careers to young people aged 10 to 18 through residential courses, Science, Technology, Engineering and Maths (STEM) Days and Scholarships.

Sponsors include Imperial College London, Rolls-Royce, BAE Systems and other industrial companies.
