= Roger Putnam (British businessman) =

British businessman

Roger Putnam CBE
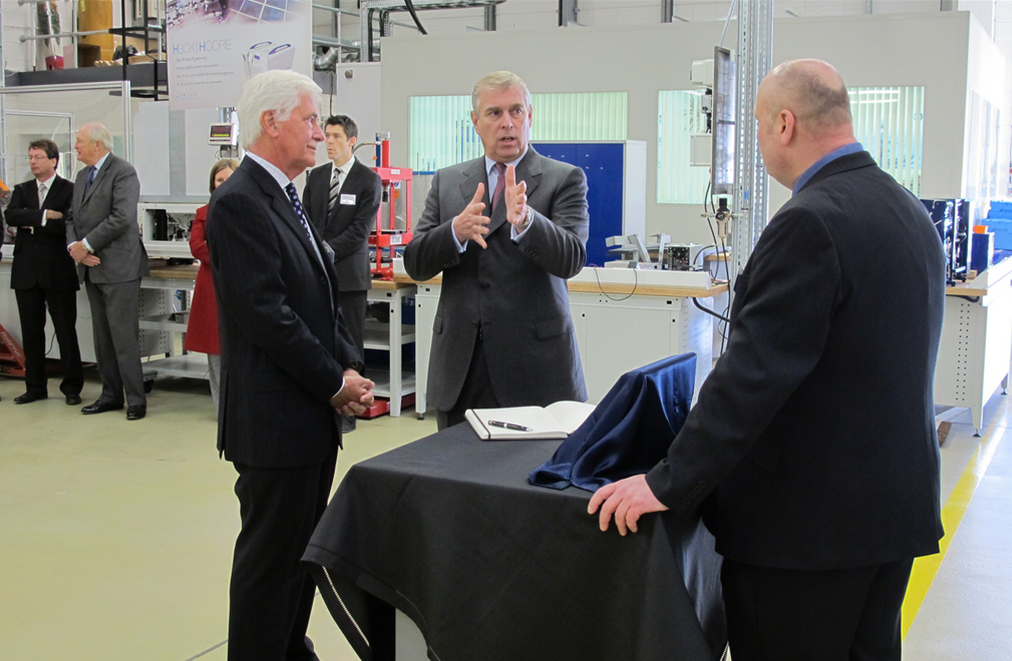
- Prof Roger Putnam on left meeting Andrew Mountbatten-Windsor and ITM Power CEO Dr Graham Cooley in 2013
- Born: August 1945 (age 80); United Kingdom
- Occupation: Businessperson
- Known for: Marketing of Lotus and Jaguar cars
- Spouse: Trish
- Children: 2

Roger George Putnam CBE is British businessman who has spent over 40 years representing British car companies in global markets and has long relationships with motorsports, F1, World Sportscar Championship and the World Rally Championships.

== Career ==
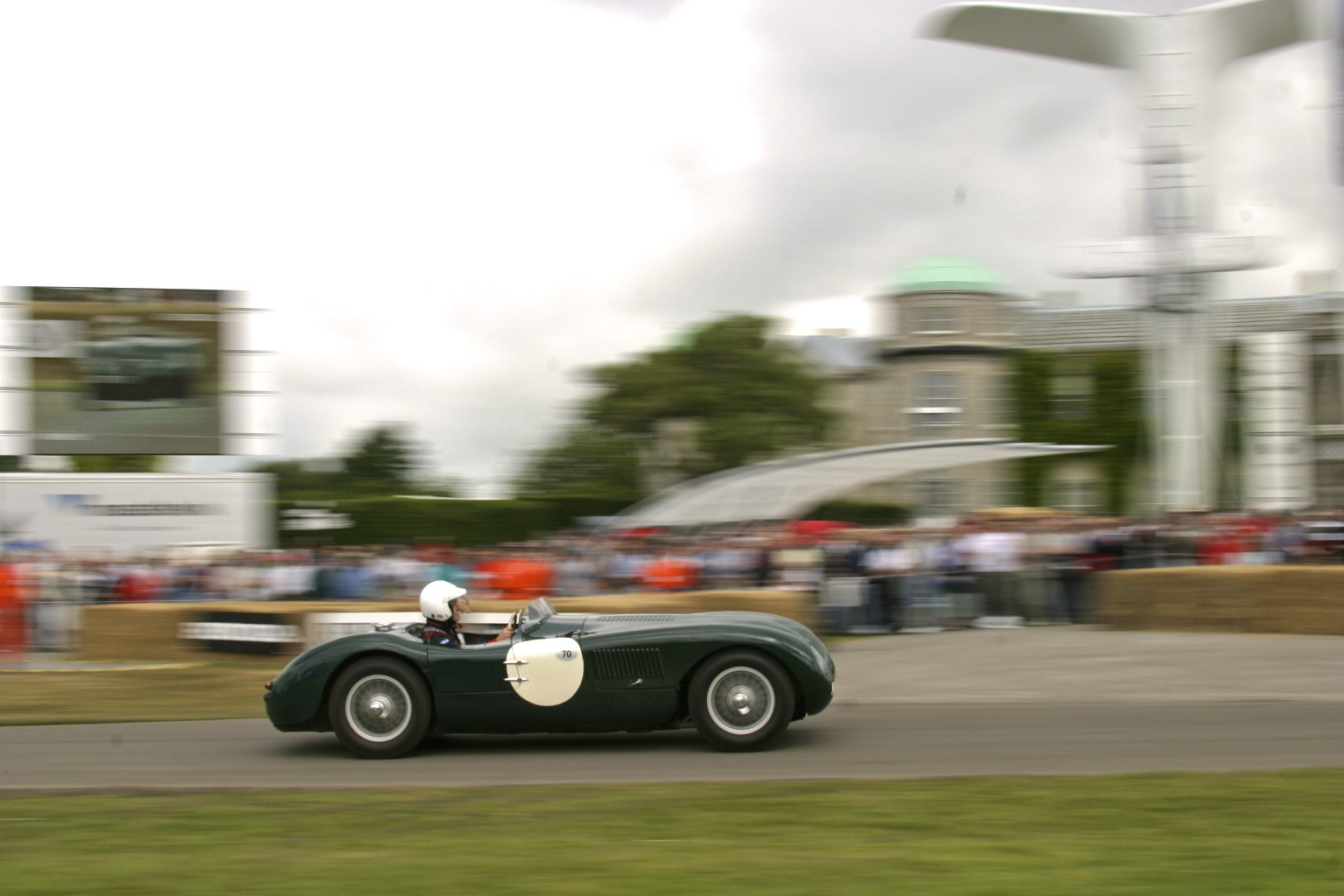
Roger Putnam driving a Jaguar C Type up the hill at the Festival of Speed at Goodwood in 2006

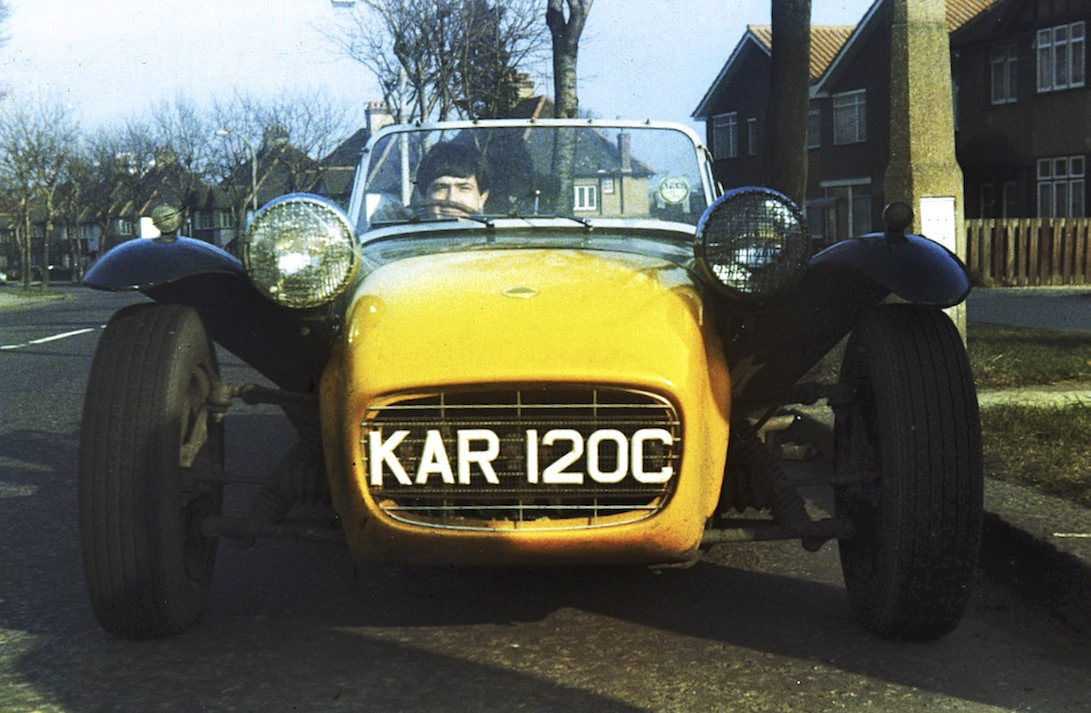
Roger's first company car at Lotus in 1966 was the Lotus 7 used in the cult TV series 'The Prisoner' with Patrick McGoohan

Educated at The Haberdashers' Aske's Boys' School, Elstree, Putnam went on to join Lotus with various roles including Public Relations Officer, Global Sales and Marketing Manager and Director of Sales & Marketing. Before being headhunted by Sir John Egan to join Jaguar Worldwide Marketing and UK Operations Director. From Jaguar, Putnam moved on to be the Chairman of Ford of Britain.

From 2005 until 2006, he was President of Society of Motor Manufacturers and Traders.

He was also a member of the Government's Energy Review Partnership and Automotive Innovation and Growth Team which reports to the Chancellor on the country's future energy strategy and the AIGT to the Prime Minister on alternative fuels and transport.

He was appointed a CBE for services to the British Motor Industry in the 2007 Birthday Honours.

Putnam was responsible for Jaguar's racing programme in the '80's which included two wins at Le Mans and two at Daytona.

== Directorships and responsibilities ==
Putnam is now the Chairman of ITM Power having joined the company as a non-executive Director in 2007.

He is also a visiting Professor of Automotive Business, City of London University

== Family ==
Roger is married to Trish and together they have two children.
