= Club Bongo =

Reggae club in Middlesbrough, England

Coordinates: 54°34′46″N 1°14′7″W

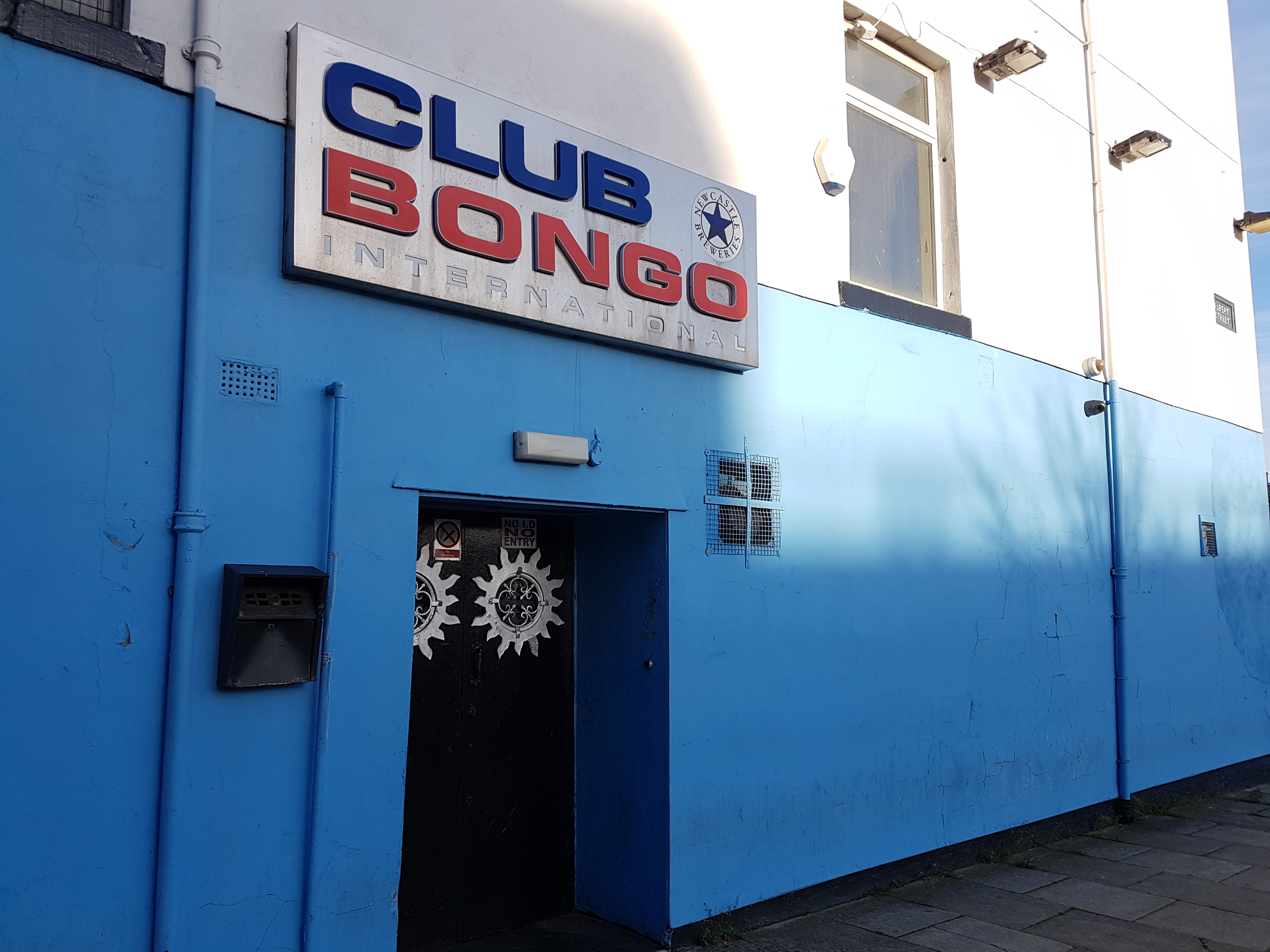
Club Bongo International - exterior

Bongo Club, also known as Club Bongo International, is a reggae club and one of the oldest nightclubs in Middlesbrough, England. The club is located on Bridge Street West near Middlesbrough Railway Station. It closed in June 2017 due to its licence being revoked after a man was attacked at the club. It had been due to re-open after a £400,000 refit in spring 2018.

== History ==
Born in 1912, in Somalia, Abdillahi Warsama served in the merchant navy during the Second World War before opening a cafe in London. The cafe became popular after Warsama purchased a jukebox from Scotland and Teddy Boys would come in to listen to the music.

In the 1960s, Warsama moved to Teesside where he set up the Kenya Cafe curry house. He was the first person to serve curry in Teesside and used to give free meals to the kids in the area. The cafe then changed its name to The Unity Club before finally settling on Bongo Club in 1963 after Warsama had seen a band he had booked play the bongos and loved the sound.

Warsama had decided to open his own club after he was turned away from a London nightspot for being black. The Bongo Club first opened its doors in 1963 so that there would be a place to meet and socialise where everyone was welcome. Soon, the club acquired a reputation for its reggae music and as a meeting place for locals and sailors from all over the world. This prompted another name change to Club Bongo International.

Though Warsama took a step back from the day-to-day running of his business in his later years, he still had the final say and was ever-present at the club over the years until his death from kidney failure on 18 September 2016 at the age of 104.

"“Every day there is someone talking about him and remembering him... Most nightclub owners, you never see them, but Abdillahi was always in the bar and no one messed with him".

“Back when the club first started it was a very poor town so he would give all of the kids in the area free curries, so they had good healthy meals. That’s why people loved him, he was a true gentleman.”

== Closure and planned reopening ==
The club had its drinks licence suspended for three weeks following a serious assault in 2013. At the time, lawyers described the club's owners as being "as much a part of this town as the Transporter Bridge and the chicken parmo."

The licence was revoked indefinitely in June 2017, after a man was found unconscious with serious head injuries outside the premises. The appeal to reinstate the licence was supported by a number of local residents, including one who submitted a 60-page petition.

The appeal was successful and the club regained its alcohol licence in December 2017, with plans to reopen in Spring 2018. The new owner Terry Barker, a longtime friend of Warsama, stated that the club would keep the same name and reggae style of music along with complete refurnishing.

As of April 2026, the club has still not reopened in its original location.
