= Smallpeice Trust =

British educational charity

The Smallpeice Trust is a British charity that provides programmes to promote engineering careers to young people aged 10 to 18 through residential courses, Science, Technology, Engineering and Maths (STEM) days, STEM clubs and STEM teacher training days.

Cosby Smallpeice (died 1977), a pioneering engineer and inventor of the Smallpeice lathe, founded the trust, following the market flotation of his company Martonair. Dr Smallpeice invested his energy and part of his personal fortune to set up the Trust to ensure that industry could benefit from his proven design and engineering philosophies “Simplicity in design, economy in production”.

The trust is governed by eminent non-executive trustees and members from a range of engineering, industry, educational and professional bodies.

In the academic year ended July 2011, The Smallpeice Trust reached out to 17,495 young people through 35 different subsidised 3 to 5 day residential courses in a range of engineering disciplines, 1-day in-school STEM days and STEM clubs. The trust has also trained 1,280 teachers to enhance their delivery of STEM in the classroom through its teacher training days.

The trust maintains a strong interface with industry, education and professional bodies that help to support, promote and develop the courses. Through these relationships the trust can provide tailored or specialised courses.

The trust awards most of its annual Arkwright Engineering Scholarships supporting students in A Level or Standard Grade standard/vocational studies at its office in Leamington Spa, England.
