= Engineering Education Scheme =

The Engineering Education Scheme is a scheme run in the United Kingdom by the Engineering Development Trust to promote the education of school students about engineering. It is part of the Royal Academy of Engineering's BEST programme.

The Engineering Education Scheme is an annual event which can run for over a year after the start. It begins with a launch day in September or October which are held in regional batches. By this point the schools will have selected their team(s) (normally made up of 4 students) who will take part. At the launch the team is put together with their company (for example Kodak or Ford, however one of the largest contributors is the Royal Navy) and their company gives them a real life challenge that they would otherwise be working on. They are also given presentations by the scheme's organisers as to exactly what they need to do. For the next 6 months the team works on the project. They get help from their teachers as well as visits from engineers from their companies who discuss their ideas with them. They may also visit the factory of their company. At the start of January the team will spend 3 days at a university having lectures from engineering professors and using the facilities to test their designs.

The scheme finishes at a 'Celebration and Assessment Day' where the teams show off their completed design at a stand along with their report which is usually about 40-80 pages long. They also give a presentation to the assessors. Often their design is actually used by the company who gave it to them. At the end of the event they are awarded a bronze, silver, gold or platinum award for their efforts. The platinum award is especially prestigious as it is awarded very infrequently. Students involved in the award often go on to read engineering at University, and the scheme is often a factor contributing to successful entry; due to the level of difficulty its completion is highly regarded by admissions tutors.

== Actual examples of projects ==
- "Design a bridge"
- "Design a machine for rolling protective plastic over photographic film"
- "Investigate and cost energy sources, including renewable for a new factory"
- "Design and build a prototype of a device to measure the draught of a submarine"
- "Design a wind turbine."

== See also ==
- Engineering Development Trust
- Royal Academy of Engineering
