= Bishop's Hatfield Girls' School =

Location
- Woods Avenue; Hatfield, Hertfordshire, AL10 8NL; England; 51°45′32″N 0°13′35″W

Information
- Type: Academy
- Established: 1960
- Local authority: Hertfordshire
- Specialist: Humanities and English
- Department for Education URN: 137757 Tables
- Ofsted: Reports
- Head teacher: Alf Wood
- Gender: Girls
- Age: 11 to 18
- Enrolment: 913As of 2023
- Capacity: 1003
- Colours: navy blue and honey yellow
- Website: www.bishophatfield.herts.sch.uk

Bishop's Hatfield Girls' School is a girls' secondary academy school for years 7 to sixth form. It is located in Hatfield, Hertfordshire in Wood's Avenue and was founded in 1960 as a girls' grammar school. The headteacher is Alf Wood. In the 2016 Ofsted report the school was judged outstanding.

== Notable alumni ==
- Diane Louise Jordan, television presenter
- Vanessa O'Loughlin, literary coach and, as Sam Blake, a novelist
- Tracey Thorn from Everything But The Girl
