= Onslow St Audrey's School =

Location
- Old Rectory Drive; Hatfield, Hertfordshire, AL10 8AB; England
- Coordinates: 51°45′37″N 0°13′14″W

Information
- Type: Academy
- Department for Education URN: 147535 Tables
- Ofsted: Reports
- Headteacher: J. Jones
- Gender: Co-educational
- Age: 11 to 18
- Enrolment: 550
- Website: www.onslow.herts.sch.uk

Onslow St Audrey's School is a co-educational secondary school and Sixth form situated in Hatfield, Hertfordshire in England. It caters for pupils aged 11 to 18.

== Sixth Form ==
The sixth form is made up of approximately 100 students, spread across two-year groups. Although the Sixth Form block, which contains a Study Room and a Common Room, is based away from the central school building, all lessons take place in the main school buildings.

The Sixth Form is part of the 16 to 19 Welwyn & Hatfield Consortium and as such offers a wide range of A-Level subjects. Within the school and in the consortium with other Welwyn and Hatfield schools. A-Levels in Mathematics, English, History, Catering and Hospitality, Art, Music, Business, ICT, Science applied, Biology, Psychology, Childcare, Photography, Public Services and Sport are offered, as well as a range of other BTECs.

== School performance ==
Its most recent Ofsted inspection report deeming it to be "good with a number of outstanding features."

The 2009 Ofsted inspection report judged care, guidance and support to be outstanding, wrote of "students' pride in and enjoyment of their school", and deemed attainment and achievement to be good. Ofsted judged overall leadership and management to be good and leadership to be outstanding.
