= Grade I listed buildings in Hertfordshire =

Hertfordshire shown in England

There are over 9,000 Grade I listed buildings in England. This page is a list of these buildings in the county of Hertfordshire, organised by district.

== Broxbourne ==
| Name | Location | Type | Completed (Note: The date given is the date used by Historic England as significant for the initial building or that of an important part in the structure's description.) | Date designated | Grid ref. (Note: Sometimes known as OSGB36, the grid reference is based on the British national grid reference system used by the Ordnance Survey.) Geo-coordinates | Entry number (Note: The "List Entry Number" is a unique number assigned to each listed building and scheduled monument by Historic England.) | Image |
|---|---|---|---|---|---|---|---|
| Church of St Mary | Cheshunt | Church | 1418–1448 | 11 June 1954 | TL3491502415; 51°42′15″N 0°02′56″W | 1172977 | Church of St Mary More images |
| Eleanor Cross | Waltham Cross | Eleanor Cross | 1291 | 11 June 1954 | TL3607300394; 51°41′09″N 0°01′59″W | 1173222 | Eleanor Cross More images |
| Parish Church of St Augustine | Broxbourne | Parish Church | C15-C16 | 13 April 1961 | TL3715906947; 51°44′40″N 0°00′53″W | 1100545 | Parish Church of St Augustine More images |
| Wormleybury | Wormley | House | 1734 | 13 April 1961 | TL3557505783; 51°44′04″N 0°02′17″W | 1100541 | Wormleybury More images |

== Dacorum ==
| Name | Location | Type | Completed | Date designated | Grid ref. Geo-coordinates | Entry number | Image |
|---|---|---|---|---|---|---|---|
| Church of St John the Baptist (Church of England) | Aldbury | Parish Church | Romanesque | 30 November 1966 | SP9635112471; 51°48′09″N 0°36′15″W | 1078047 | Church of St John the Baptist (Church of England) More images |
| Berkhamsted School Old Building | Berkhamsted | School | 1544 | 29 July 1950 | SP9939007814; 51°45′37″N 0°33′41″W | 1342152 | Berkhamsted School Old Building More images |
| Beechwood Park School and Walls of Walled Garden adjoining | Beechwood Park, Flamstead | House | c. 1664 | 22 October 1952 | TL0453514478; 51°49′09″N 0°29′05″W | 1100376 | Beechwood Park School and Walls of Walled Garden adjoining More images |
| Church of St Leonard | Flamstead | Parish Church | Early 12th century | 26 January 1967 | TL0788714548; 51°49′09″N 0°26′10″W | 1172799 | Church of St Leonard More images |
| Church of St John the Baptist | Great Gaddesden | Parish Church | Early 12th century | 26 January 1967 | TL0286811263; 51°47′26″N 0°30′36″W | 1101262 | Church of St John the Baptist More images |
| Ashridge Management College | Little Gaddesden | House | 1884 | 14 May 1952 | SP9939012181; 51°47′58″N 0°33′36″W | 1348442 | Ashridge Management College More images |
| Church of St Peter and St Paul (Church of England) | Little Gaddesden | Urn | 1671 | 30 November 1966 | SP9978813820; 51°48′51″N 0°33′14″W | 1100424 | Church of St Peter and St Paul (Church of England) More images |
| Church of Saint Mary | Northchurch | Church | Saxon | 29 July 1950 | SP9744008833; 51°46′11″N 0°35′21″W | 1348470 | Church of Saint Mary More images |
| Church of St Peter St Paul (Church of England) | Tring | Parish Church | 13th century | 21 September 1951 | SP9243611495; 51°47′40″N 0°39′40″W | 1084356 | Church of St Peter St Paul (Church of England) More images |
| Church of St Mary (Church of England) | Puttenham | Parish Church | Early 14th century | 30 November 1966 | SP8852014927; 51°49′33″N 0°43′01″W | 1076690 | Church of St Mary (Church of England) More images |
| Church of St Mary | Hemel Hempstead | Church | 1140–80 | 18 June 1948 | TL0550307813; 51°45′33″N 0°28′22″W | 1078099 | Church of St Mary More images |
| 130–136 Piccott's End | Piccotts End | Row | 15th century | 20 May 1954 | TL0513709107; 51°46′15″N 0°28′40″W | 1342208 | 130–136 Piccott's End More images |

== East Hertfordshire ==
| Name | Location | Type | Completed | Date designated | Grid ref. Geo-coordinates | Entry number | Image |
|---|---|---|---|---|---|---|---|
| Church of St George | Anstey | Parish Church | Late 12th century | 22 February 1967 | TL4042832890; 51°58′36″N 0°02′35″E | 1101870 | Church of St George More images |
| Parish Church of St Lawrence | Ardeley | Parish Church | 13th century or earlier | 22 February 1967 | TL3081727138; 51°55′39″N 0°05′56″W | 1174231 | Parish Church of St Lawrence More images |
| Parish Church of St Mary | Aspenden | Parish Church | 11th century | 22 February 1967 | TL3536428392; 51°56′15″N 0°01′56″W | 1347966 | Parish Church of St Mary More images |
| Aston Bury Manor | Aston | Manor House | Mid 17th century | 20 October 1952 | TL2760621702; 51°52′45″N 0°08′51″W | 1174988 | Aston Bury Manor More images |
| Church of St Peter | Benington | Church | Late 13th century or early 14th century | 24 November 1966 | TL2969223579; 51°53′44″N 0°07′00″W | 1101403 | Church of St Peter More images |
| Remains of Benington Castle (in Grounds of the Lordship 15 Metres to South East of House) | Benington | Castle | 1130S | 24 November 1966 | TL2968023633; 51°53′46″N 0°07′00″W | 1175349 | Remains of Benington Castle (in Grounds of the Lordship 15 Metres to South East of House) More images |
| Church of St Michael | Bishop's Stortford | Church | Early 15th century | 18 October 1949 | TL4862321336; 51°52′15″N 0°09′27″E | 1101613 | Church of St Michael More images |
| Remains of Waytemore Castle | Bishop's Stortford | Keep | 12th century | 18 October 1949 | TL4897621447; 51°52′18″N 0°09′45″E | 1101603 | Remains of Waytemore Castle More images |
| Church of St Mary the Virgin | Braughing | Church | 1971 | 22 February 1967 | TL3961925204; 51°54′28″N 0°01′42″E | 1347516 | Church of St Mary the Virgin More images |
| Brent Pelham Hall, Gate Piers and Boundary Wall from North West Front of Hall, turning to South West and then South East to Gate | Brent Pelham | House | Late 17th century | 19 October 1951 | TL4335830863; 51°57′28″N 0°05′06″E | 1101916 | Brent Pelham Hall, Gate Piers and Boundary Wall from North West Front of Hall, turning to South West and then South East to Gate |
| Church of St Peter | Buntingford | Church | c. 1615 | 22 February 1967 | TL3630729324; 51°56′45″N 0°01′06″W | 1348000 | Church of St Peter More images |
| The Lordship | Cottered | Farmhouse | Early-mid 15th century | 19 October 1951 | TL3189829194; 51°56′44″N 0°04′57″W | 1348017 | Upload Photo |
| Johnston Monument | Gilston | Commemorative Monument | 1923 | 19 September 1984 | TL4395213512; 51°48′06″N 0°05′11″E | 1101277 | Upload Photo |
| Church of St Mary | Gilston | Church | Early 13th century | 24 January 1967 | TL4398113526; 51°48′07″N 0°05′12″E | 1308248 | Church of St Mary More images |
| Balls Park | Hertford | House | Early 18th century | 10 February 1950 | TL3371111928; 51°47′24″N 0°03′46″W | 1269013 | Balls Park More images |
| Church of St Leonard | Bengeo, Hertford | Church | 1695 | 10 February 1950 | TL3301813638; 51°48′20″N 0°04′20″W | 1268717 | Church of St Leonard More images |
| Friends Meeting House | Hertford | Friends Meeting House | 1670 | 9 May 2019 | TL3281212705; 51°47′50″N 0°04′32″W | 1268759 | Friends Meeting House More images |
| Gatehouse to Hertford Castle | Hertford | Castle | Later | 10 February 1950 | TL3245712465; 51°47′43″N 0°04′50″W | 1269027 | Gatehouse to Hertford Castle More images |
| Shire Hall | Hertford | Assembly Rooms | 1767–1771 | 10 February 1950 | TL3267212596; 51°47′47″N 0°04′39″W | 1268930 | Shire Hall More images |
| Church of St Mary Little Hormead | Little Hormead | Parish Church | 11th century | 22 February 1967 | TL3984929104; 51°56′34″N 0°01′59″E | 1176874 | Church of St Mary Little Hormead More images |
| Hunsdon House | Hunsdon | Country House | Mid 15th century | 4 December 1951 | TL4190412744; 51°47′43″N 0°03′23″E | 1347687 | Hunsdon House More images |
| Parish Church of St Dunstan | Hunsdon | Parish Church | Early 14th century | 24 January 1967 | TL4181512710; 51°47′42″N 0°03′18″E | 1101973 | Parish Church of St Dunstan More images |
| Parish Church of St Cecilia | Church End, Little Hadham | Church | Medieval | 22 February 1967 | TL4462022778; 51°53′05″N 0°06′00″E | 1290608 | Parish Church of St Cecilia More images |
| Parish Church of All Saints | Little Munden | Parish Church | 11th century | 24 January 1967 | TL3345121887; 51°52′47″N 0°03′46″W | 1102260 | Parish Church of All Saints More images |
| Boundary Wall at Yewtree Farm | Hadham Cross, Much Hadham | Boundary Wall | Mid-late 19th century | 30 April 1985 | TL4266918553; 51°50′50″N 0°04′11″E | 1289112 | Upload Photo |
| Moor Place | Kettle Green, Much Hadham | Country House | 1775-9 | 22 February 1967 | TL4215318918; 51°51′03″N 0°03′45″E | 1289132 | Moor Place More images |
| Much Hadham Hall | Much Hadham | Country House | 1726-9 | 22 February 1967 | TL4283219368; 51°51′17″N 0°04′21″E | 1212633 | Much Hadham Hall More images |
| Parish Church of St Andrew | Much Hadham | Parish Church | 12th century | 22 February 1967 | TL4303319674; 51°51′26″N 0°04′32″E | 1289691 | Parish Church of St Andrew More images |
| Parish Church of Great St Mary's | Sawbridgeworth | Anglican Church | 13th century | 6 June 1952 | TL4850014822; 51°48′44″N 0°09′10″E | 1101668 | Parish Church of Great St Mary's More images |
| Church of St Mary | Standon | Church | 15th century | 24 January 1967 | TL3964922257; 51°52′53″N 0°01′39″E | 1102348 | Church of St Mary More images |
| Old Church of St James | Stanstead Abbotts | Church | 12th century | 24 January 1967 | TL3997211061; 51°46′51″N 0°01′40″E | 1078730 | Old Church of St James More images |
| Rye House Gatehouse | Lea Valley Park, Stanstead Abbotts | Moat | 15th century | 4 December 1951 | TL3857309955; 51°46′16″N 0°00′25″E | 1341877 | Rye House Gatehouse More images |
| Church of St Peter | Tewin | Church | 11th century | 24 November 1966 | TL2681214256; 51°48′45″N 0°09′43″W | 1341477 | Church of St Peter More images |
| Parish Church of St James the Great | Thorley | Moat | 1834 | 22 February 1967 | TL4760418844; 51°50′55″N 0°08′29″E | 1213947 | Parish Church of St James the Great More images |
| Parish Church of St Mary the Virgin | Walkern | Parish Church | Saxon | 24 November 1966 | TL2928626565; 51°55′21″N 0°07′17″W | 1101384 | Parish Church of St Mary the Virgin More images |
| Church of St Mary | Ware | Church | 1982 | 8 May 1950 | TL3568014430; 51°48′43″N 0°02′00″W | 1217410 | Church of St Mary More images |
| Grotto between Nos 28 and 34 (Scott's Grotto) | Ware | Grotto | 1764–1768 | 8 May 1950 | TL3568813832; 51°48′24″N 0°02′00″W | 1238171 | Grotto between Nos 28 and 34 (Scott's Grotto) More images |
| Place House | Ware | House | 17th century | 8 May 1950 | TL3590314372; 51°48′41″N 0°01′48″W | 1275417 | Place House More images |
| The Priory (Ware Town Council Offices and Community Centre) | Ware | Kitchen | 1993-4 | 8 May 1950 | TL3555114312; 51°48′40″N 0°02′06″W | 1237950 | The Priory (Ware Town Council Offices and Community Centre) More images |
| Woodhall Park (Heath Mount School) | Woodhall Park, Watton-at-Stone | Country House | 1777–82 | 20 October 1952 | TL3164518896; 51°51′11″N 0°05′24″W | 1031363 | Woodhall Park (Heath Mount School) More images |
| Church of St Giles | Wyddial | Parish Church | 14th century | 22 February 1967 | TL3741431763; 51°58′03″N 0°00′04″W | 1101811 | Church of St Giles More images |

== Hertsmere ==
| Name | Location | Type | Completed | Date designated | Grid ref. Geo-coordinates | Entry number | Image |
|---|---|---|---|---|---|---|---|
| Church of St John the Baptist | Aldenham | Parish Church | 12th century | 1 September 1953 | TQ1398898463; 51°40′24″N 0°21′11″W | 1103642 | Church of St John the Baptist More images |
| Tyttenhanger House | Ridge | Country House | c. 1655 | 25 February 1952 | TL1914604655; 51°43′41″N 0°16′35″W | 1174935 | Tyttenhanger House More images |
| Church of St Giles | South Mimms | Parish Church | 13th century | 20 May 1949 | TL2223101196; 51°41′46″N 0°13′58″W | 1174342 | Church of St Giles More images |

== North Hertfordshire ==
| Name | Location | Type | Completed | Date designated | Grid ref. Geo-coordinates | Entry number | Image |
|---|---|---|---|---|---|---|---|
| Church of St Mary the Virgin | Ashwell | Parish Church | 14th century | 27 May 1968 | TL2671039779; 52°02′31″N 0°09′14″W | 1102715 | Church of St Mary the Virgin More images |
| Church of St Mary Magdalene | Barkway | Parish Church | 13th century | 27 May 1968 | TL3828035610; 52°00′06″N 0°00′47″E | 1102624 | Church of St Mary Magdalene More images |
| Church of St Mary | Graveley | Parish Church | 12th century | 27 May 1968 | TL2348928125; 51°56′17″N 0°12′18″W | 1102525 | Church of St Mary More images |
| Church of St Katherine of Alexandria | Ickleford | Parish Church | Mid 12th century | 27 May 1968 | TL1824031641; 51°58′14″N 0°16′49″W | 1295821 | Church of St Katherine of Alexandria More images |
| Parish Church of St Peter and St Paul | Kimpton | Parish Church | c. 1200 | 27 May 1968 | TL1775818526; 51°51′10″N 0°17′30″W | 1102783 | Parish Church of St Peter and St Paul More images |
| Church of St Mary | King's Walden | Parish Church | 12th century to 13th century | 27 May 1968 | TL1602323507; 51°53′53″N 0°18′55″W | 1102475 | Church of St Mary More images |
| Church of St Mary and St Thomas | Old Knebworth | Parish Church | c. 1150 | 27 May 1968 | TL2308521007; 51°52′27″N 0°12′49″W | 1295771 | Church of St Mary and St Thomas More images |
| Church of St Mary Magdalene | Great Offley | Parish Church | Early 13th century | 27 May 1968 | TL1453326816; 51°55′41″N 0°20′09″W | 1347084 | Church of St Mary Magdalene More images |
| Church of St Mary | Pirton | Motte and Bailey | Early 12th century | 27 May 1968 | TL1469431661; 51°58′18″N 0°19′54″W | 1347110 | Church of St Mary More images |
| High Down House with Buildings and Walls around Courtyard on North Side | Pirton | Courtyard House | 1599 | 9 June 1952 | TL1439530544; 51°57′42″N 0°20′11″W | 1175442 | High Down House with Buildings and Walls around Courtyard on North Side More images |
| Church of St Mary | Reed | Parish Church | Early 11th century | 27 May 1968 | TL3613235748; 52°00′13″N 0°01′06″W | 1102559 | Church of St Mary More images |
| Church of St John the Baptist | Royston | Church | Second Half 12th century | 14 June 1964 | TL3576240678; 52°02′52″N 0°01′18″W | 1295575 | Church of St John the Baptist More images |
| Royston Cave | Royston | Cave | 13th century OR 14th century | 14 June 1976 | TL3562940711; 52°02′54″N 0°01′25″W | 1102013 | Royston Cave More images |
| 18 Melbourn Street | Royston | House | 18th century | 14 June 1964 | TL3576340737; 52°02′54″N 0°01′18″W | 1174750 | 18 Melbourn Street More images |
| 23 Kneesworth Street | Royston | House | c.1700 remodelling of earlier house | 14 June 1964 | TL3556640818; 52°02′57″N 0°01′28″W | 1295658 | 23 Kneesworth Street More images |
| Church of All Saints | Sandon | Parish Church | 1348 | 27 May 1968 | TL3223734526; 51°59′36″N 0°04′32″W | 1176178 | Church of All Saints More images |
| Almshoe Bury | St Ippolyts | Farmhouse | c. 1374 | 27 May 1968 | TL2067125286; 51°54′47″N 0°14′49″W | 1102513 | Almshoe Bury More images |
| Church of St Ippolyts | St Ippolyts | Parish Church | 11th century | 27 May 1968 | TL1979227127; 51°55′47″N 0°15′33″W | 1347411 | Church of St Ippolyts More images |
| Church of All Saints | St Paul's Walden | Parish Church | 12th century or 13th century | 27 May 1968 | TL1925022284; 51°53′11″N 0°16′07″W | 1347042 | Church of All Saints More images |
| Church of the Holy Trinity | Church End, Weston | Parish Church | 12th century | 27 May 1968 | TL2658829952; 51°57′13″N 0°09′34″W | 1347414 | Church of the Holy Trinity More images |
| Church of St Mary the Virgin | Great Wymondley | Parish Church | 12th century | 27 May 1968 | TL2147528530; 51°56′31″N 0°14′03″W | 1102497 | Church of St Mary the Virgin More images |
| The Priory | Little Wymondley | House | c1536 after 1536 | 27 May 1968 | TL2186327974; 51°56′13″N 0°13′44″W | 1102499 | Upload Photo |
| Wymondley Bury | Little Wymondley | Farmhouse | 16th century | 27 May 1968 | TL2167827074; 51°55′44″N 0°13′54″W | 1347446 | Upload Photo |
| Church of Saint Mary | Hitchin | Parish Church | 12th century | 13 April 1951 | TL1849829120; 51°56′53″N 0°16′38″W | 1296273 | Church of Saint Mary More images |
| Church of St. Mary the Virgin | Baldock | Church | 14th century | 8 November 1949 | TL2439633905; 51°59′23″N 0°11′23″W | 1347611 | Church of St. Mary the Virgin More images |
| The Priory | Hitchin | Country House | 17th century | 13 April 1951 | TL1838328793; 51°56′42″N 0°16′45″W | 1102211 | The Priory More images |

== St Albans ==
| Name | Location | Type | Completed | Date designated | Grid ref. Geo-coordinates | Entry number | Image |
|---|---|---|---|---|---|---|---|
| Rothamsted Manor House | Hatching Green, Harpenden | Manor House | 16th century | 19 October 1953 | TL1252613169; 51°48′21″N 0°22′10″W | 1347199 | Rothamsted Manor House More images |
| Parish Church of St Mary | Redbourn Common, Redbourn | Parish Church | c. 1100 | 19 October 1953 | TL0999411570; 51°47′31″N 0°24′24″W | 1295584 | Parish Church of St Mary More images |
| Remains of Old Gorhambury House | St Michael, St Albans | Country House | 1563 | 19 October 1953 | TL1102907616; 51°45′22″N 0°23′34″W | 1175197 | Remains of Old Gorhambury House More images |
| Church of St Helen | Wheathampstead | Parish Church | Pre-Conquest | 19 October 1953 | TL1765314025; 51°48′45″N 0°17′41″W | 1103657 | Church of St Helen More images |
| Mackerye End | Wheathampstead | Manor House | 1665 | 19 October 1953 | TL1561015582; 51°49′37″N 0°19′26″W | 1103672 | Mackerye End More images |
| Abbey Church of St Alban | St Albans | Abbey | 1077–1088 | 8 May 1950 | TL1445907090; 51°45′03″N 0°20′36″W | 1103163 | Abbey Church of St Alban More images |
| Church of St Michael's | St Albans | Church | Founded mid 10th century | 8 May 1950 | TL1357207304; 51°45′11″N 0°21′22″W | 1103089 | Church of St Michael's More images |
| Clock Tower | St Albans | Bell Tower | 1403–1412 | 8 May 1950 | TL1465107150; 51°45′05″N 0°20′26″W | 1103127 | Clock Tower More images |
| The Abbey Gate | St Albans | Gatehouse | 14th century | 8 May 1950 | TL1439507106; 51°45′04″N 0°20′39″W | 1103077 | The Abbey Gate More images |
| Verulamium | St Albans | Ruin | Roman | 8 May 1950 | TL1363407286; 51°45′10″N 0°21′19″W | 1103030 | Verulamium More images |

== Stevenage ==
| Name | Location | Type | Completed | Date designated | Grid ref. Geo-coordinates | Entry number | Image |
|---|---|---|---|---|---|---|---|
| Church of Saint Nicholas | Stevenage | Church | c. 1125 | 18 February 1948 | TL2407426207; 51°55′14″N 0°11′50″W | 1176923 | Church of Saint Nicholas More images |
| Rooks Nest House (Howards) | Stevenage | House | 18th century | 30 September 1976 | TL2443826721; 51°55′30″N 0°11′30″W | 1176972 | Rooks Nest House (Howards) More images |

== Three Rivers ==
| Name | Location | Type | Completed | Date designated | Grid ref. Geo-coordinates | Entry number | Image |
|---|---|---|---|---|---|---|---|
| Church of St Lawrence the Martyr | Abbots Langley | Parish Church | Late 12th century | 1 September 1953 | TL0948202189; 51°42′28″N 0°25′01″W | 1296433 | Church of St Lawrence the Martyr More images |
| The Orchard | Chorleywood | House | 1899–1900 | 16 July 1975 | TQ0193295698; 51°39′03″N 0°31′41″W | 1348234 | The Orchard More images |
| Moor Park and Orangery/Stable Block | Rickmansworth | Country House | Late 17th century | 26 July 1951 | TQ0745893316; 51°37′42″N 0°26′56″W | 1173698 | Moor Park and Orangery/Stable Block More images |

== Watford ==
| Name | Location | Type | Completed | Date designated | Grid ref. Geo-coordinates | Entry number | Image |
|---|---|---|---|---|---|---|---|
| Church of St Mary | Watford | Church | 13th century | 26 August 1952 | TQ1107696316; 51°39′17″N 0°23′45″W | 1101120 | Church of St Mary More images |
| Holy Rood Church | Watford | Roman Catholic Church | 1879–1900 | 12 September 1980 | TQ1087796327; 51°39′17″N 0°23′55″W | 1101104 | Holy Rood Church More images |

== Welwyn Hatfield ==
| Name | Location | Type | Completed | Date designated | Grid ref. Geo-coordinates | Entry number | Image |
|---|---|---|---|---|---|---|---|
| New Saint Lawrence Church | Ayot St. Lawrence | Church | 1778 | 24 January 1967 | TL1917116895; 51°50′17″N 0°16′18″W | 1348106 | New Saint Lawrence Church More images |
| Brocket Hall | Lemsford | Country House | c. 1760 | 6 February 1952 | TL2140813036; 51°48′10″N 0°14′26″W | 1100987 | Brocket Hall More images |
| Hatfield House | Old Hatfield, Hatfield | Country House | 1607–1612 | 6 February 1952 | TL2371508394; 51°45′38″N 0°12′32″W | 1173363 | Hatfield House More images |
| Parish Church of St Etheldreda | Hatfield | Church | 13th century | 30 March 1966 | TL2350508488; 51°45′41″N 0°12′43″W | 1348124 | Parish Church of St Etheldreda More images |
| The Palace | Old Hatfield, Hatfield | Bishops Palace | c. 1480 | 6 February 1952 | TL2357808460; 51°45′40″N 0°12′39″W | 1348152 | The Palace More images |
| North Mymms Park with Adjoining Garden Walls and Ha Ha | North Mymms | Country House | c. 1600 | 6 February 1952 | TL2177604267; 51°43′26″N 0°14′18″W | 1100946 | North Mymms Park with Adjoining Garden Walls and Ha Ha More images |
