= Rooks Nest House =

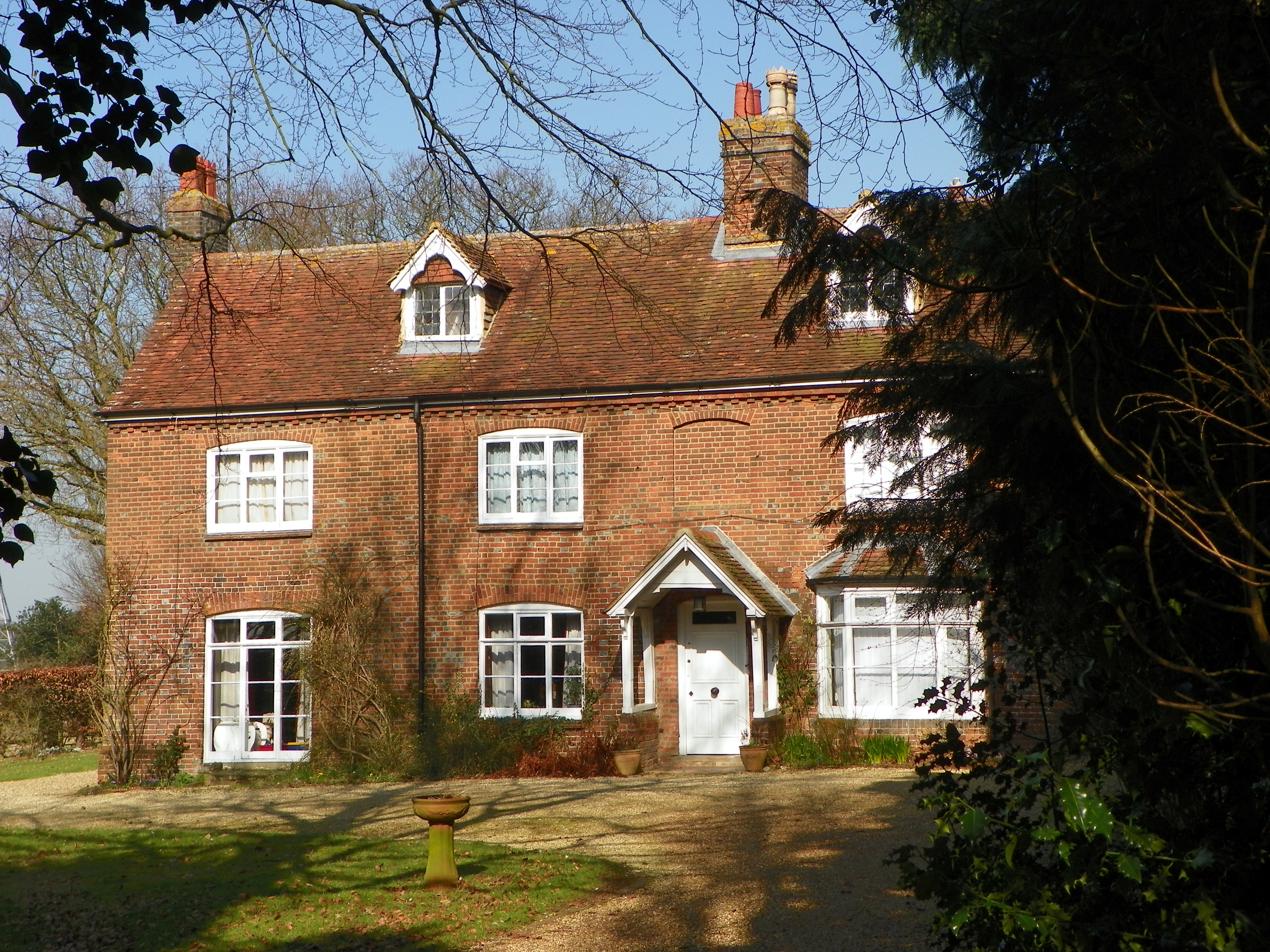
- Rooks Nest House, Stevenage
- Alternative names: Upper Rooks Nest; Howards; Rooksnest

General information
- Type: House
- Address: Weston Road, Stevenage, Hertfordshire, United Kingdom
- Coordinates: 51.9251°N 0.1917°W
- Designations: Grade I listed building
- Known for: Home of E. M. Forster; Inspiration for Howards End; Home of Elizabeth Poston

Rooks Nest House is a house on Weston Road, Stevenage, Hertfordshire. It was the childhood home of the author E. M. Forster (1879–1970) who described it in the novel Howards End. It is Grade I listed for its historical interest and literary associations.

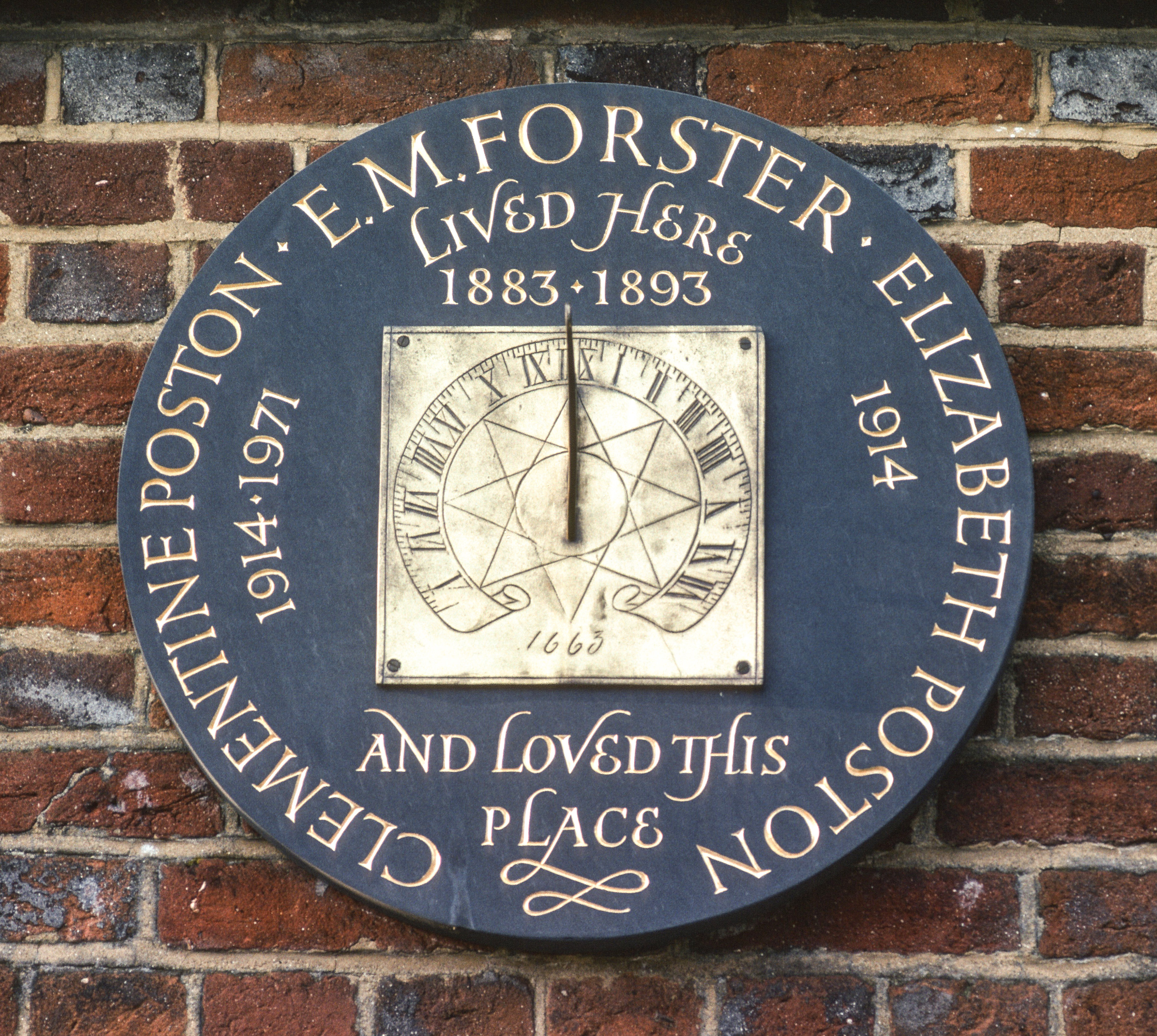
Plaque designed by Bob Duvivier at Rooks Nest, the former home which was the inspiration for Howards End in E M Forster's novel.

Forster's mother Lily, who was widowed, rented the property between 1883 and 1893. Mother and child had to leave, unwillingly, when the owners wished it vacated.

== History and residents ==
The house was originally known as Upper Rooks Nest, but was known as Howards to distinguish it from its neighbour, Lower Rooks Nest Farm, taking the name from the family who farmed there. The Howard family farmed from Rooks Nest House for over 300 years until one Mr Howard's small farm failed due to bad harvests and the importation of cheap straw hats from China and Japan. The family also owned (Lower) Rooks Nest Farm until the early 1700s when it was acquired by the neighbouring Chesfield estate. The Howards prospered in the 18th century but were less fortunate in the 19th century and it was probably too small to be economically viable, while the neighbouring farm continued to grow. The Howards family were all baptised, married and buried at the nearby St Nicholas' Church.

One of the Howards sold the house in 1882 to Lieutenant-Colonel Robert Hindley Wilkinson, who lived at Chesfield Park in the neighbouring parish of Graveley, Wilkinson already owned land in the hamlet of Rooks Nest as part of his Chesfield estate, and with the purchase of the house he then owned the whole hamlet. Where the Howard family went after this is unknown. Wilkinson gave the house a "perfunctory renovation" and changed its name, and the house was mentioned in an 1882 marriage settlement between Caroline, Wilkinson's only surviving child, and Charles Poyntz-Stewart of Upper Norwood, where it was referred to as "Rooksnest late Howards Farm".

Wilkinson advertised the house to let in 1882, at £55 per year including four acres of pasture, or £45 without pasture. The widowed Lily Forster was looking for a home away from London with her son, Morgan (the author E. M. Forster). The house became Forster's childhood home, and he and his mother lived there from March 1883 to 1893. Aged 5, while living in the house, Forster gave lessons to the servant girls, who were aged 10 to 15, in dancing, geography and astrology. Forster also played hide and seek with them, allowing him to discover the house intimately. Forster was fascinated with the house and had affection for it, seeing it as a secure home, though his mother never set down roots locally.

Wilkinson died in 1888 and the property was inherited by his daughter, Caroline Poyntz-Stewart Meanwhile, Lily became friends with the Poston family, including Charles Poston, who moved into Highfield in Pin Green near Stevenage in 1886, with his wife, Clementine, son, Charles, and daughter, Mary. The Forsters moved out of Rooks Nest in 1893 and Lily moved to Tonbridge so Forster could school there as a day boy, but the decision was hastened by Poyntz-Stewart's refusal to renew the lease. Forster was homesick so drew a sketch map of the house and garden, and wrote a brief "Rooks Nest memoir".

Elizabeth Poston, composer and president of the Society of Women Musicians, was born at Highfield in 1905 and in 1914, the widowed Clementine Poston, daughter Elizabeth and son Ralph moved to Rooks Nest House as tenants of the Poyntz-Stewarts of Chesfield. Forster and Poston went on to meet at a concert at the National Gallery during the war, and he became a regular visitor to his old home. Poston stayed at Rooks Nest after her mother's death and was able to buy it. Forster and Poston had installed a plaque on the exterior wall of the building that read: "E. M. Forster, Elizabeth Poston, Clementine Poston lived here and loved this place". Poston stayed there until her death in 1987.

Rooks Nest was then occupied by Dr Malcolm Williamson, the Australian-born Master of the Queen's Music, who died in 2003. In September 2017 the house was put up for sale with a guide price of £1.5 million.

== Influence on Forster's works ==
Howards End (1910) was Forster's novel about his childhood home. Forster's "Rooksnest memoir", written by 1894 when he was 15, mentions Wilkinson as the landlord. Forster's dislike of Wilkinson and the fact he made his mother unhappy led to him thinking all landlords unpleasant. The Postons were unwitting prototypes to the characters Charles and Ruth Wilcox in Howards End. Forster continued to visit the house into the later 1940s, and he retained the furniture all his life. The memoir was published with the Penguin Modern Classics edition of Howards End. Another memoir by Forster, from the 1940s and about West Hackhurst, Abinger Hammer in Surrey, which was his home from 1925, returns to the associations of Rooks Nest.

Lily arranged for successive garden boys to play with Morgan on Wednesday afternoons but they were young and never stayed for long. Morgan's favourite garden boy was called Ansell and in The Longest Journey (1907), the character of Stewart Ansell is a "guardian angel" to Ricky. Ansell, written in 1903, published 1972, is another tribute to him.

== Description ==
Rooks Nest House is located on a hill at the northern edge of Stevenage. In 1882 it was described as "Beautifully situated with extensive views over some of the prettiest parts of Hertfordshire." The house was always in Stevenage parish.

According to the 1976 listing by Historic England, the house is of 17th century or earlier origins and was refronted in the 18th century. The main structure of the house is timber framed, and its front wall is of red brick with some grey headers. It has a tiled roof with two gabled lattice casement dormers. There are two storeys and attics. The first floor has three casement windows with glazing bars under cambered arches. The ground floor has a similar casement window, a French window on the left and a canted bay window on the right. There is a large central chimneystack. The ground floor has a bressummer to a wide fireplace, the timber framework is exposed in some rooms and there are 18th century fielded panelled doors. The house originally had a thatched roof, which attracted mice, and some is still intact under its later covering of tile.

The Howard family had 17 acres of land with the property. It was the Howards who rebuilt the front of the house in the 18th century and installed "fashionable" panelled doors in all rooms. Rooks Nest House still had at 17 acres of land by 1871, but the 1882 marriage settlement described the land as including "house and homestead, home close and malthouse close", with pasturage of 4 acres, 3 roods and 4 perches. When the Fosters were living there it remained relatively unmodernised. Running water was not available until after the Forsters had left, although the hamlet of Rooks Nest was notable as the site of Stevenage's first fresh water supply from a borehole opened here in 1885. However, the borehole did not benefit the Forsters and they did not have a well and they had to purchase drinking water from next door, the Franklin family at Rooks Nest Farm.

An 1882 advert to let the house listed a drawing room, dining room, kitchen, hall, scullery, pantry and larder on the ground floor, four bedrooms on the first floor, attics, WC and cellars. Lily Forster wrote to a friend, describing the house as "a very old gabled house and yet it is perfectly new, it has been refurbished" and described two sitting rooms, a large hall and six bedrooms. She brought her own furniture into the house and set about decorating the house to her own taste, surrounding the fireplace in the drawing room with a large ornate dark-wood mantlepiece that dominated the room. Lily had the room photographed and a copy sent to a family member, in which she mentioned "two little black tea tables", "a tall, old-fashioned bureau [with] a small oak bookcase on each side of it" and a "piano opposite the window". Some years later she had the house redecorated.

The house was designated a Grade I listed building on 30 September 1976 for "historic interest and literary associations".

== Forster Country ==
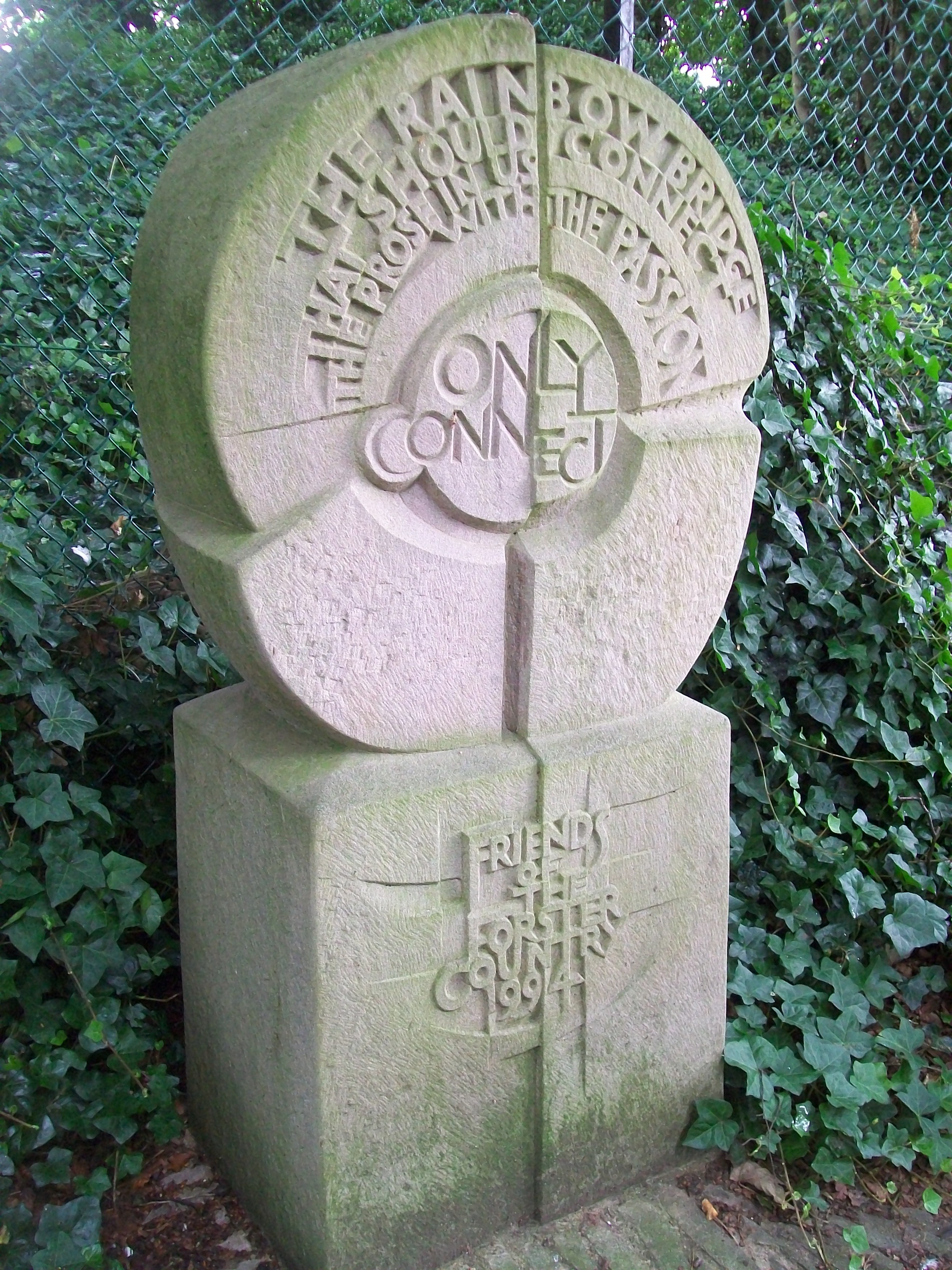
The monument to Forster in Stevenage, Hertfordshire, near Rooks Nest where Forster grew up. He based the setting for his novel Howards End on this area, now informally known as Forster Country.

The building is on the edge of Stevenage, which has expanded massively since being designated a new town in the 1940s. As at 2020, the countryside towards Graveley has been protected as green belt, preserving the views from the house.

The area to the north west and west of Rooks Nest House is the only farmland remaining in Stevenage (the area to the east of the house now comprises the St Nicholas neighbourhood of the town). The landscape was termed 'Forster Country' in a letter to The Times signed by a number of literary figures, published on 29 December 1960, written in response to two compulsory purchase orders made by the Stevenage Development Corporation, and expressed the hope that 200 acres of countryside around the house could be preserved both as one of the last beauty spots within 30 miles of London and "because it is the Forster country of Howards End." The letter says, "Literate people the world over feel that it [Forster country] should be preserved in its original setting as one of our greatest literary landmarks." It was signed by W. H. Auden, John Betjeman, Sir Arthur Bryant, Lord David Cecil, Graham Greene, John G. Murray, Harold Nicolson, Max Reinhardt, Dr C. V. Wedgewood and Vita Sackville-West. In 1979, the centenary of the author's birth, the area was officially named the Forster Country by local planners after efforts by a campaign group, the Friends of the Forster Country, which aims to preserve the landscape that Forster knew for future generations. The area was first named Forster Country in The Guardian in 1961. Friends of the Forster Country were victorious in 1994 when they helped to get a government agreement to modify the Green Belt boundary to "protect for all time the open green space to the north of Stevenage known as the Forster Country". However, as of 2020, there are proposals for housing developments in the area.

On 29 November 1997 a sculpture marking Forster's connection with the area was unveiled beside St Nicholas churchyard by the MP for Stevenage, Barbara Follett. The sculpture is marked with the words "Only Connect" with a fuller text: "THE RAINBOW BRIDGE THAT SHOULD CONNECT THE PROSE IN US WITH THE PASSION". Only Connect is the world's only monument to Forster. It was carved by Angela Godfrey on commission from the Friends of the Forster Country with joint financing from Stevenage Borough Council and Hertfordshire County Council. The title is in acknowledgement of the subtitle of Howards End and it marks the entry to Forster Country.

== See also ==
- Grade I listed buildings in Hertfordshire

== Bibliography ==
- Ashby, Margaret (1982). The Book of Stevenage. Barracuda Books. ISBN 0860231755.
- Ashby, Margaret (1991). Forster Country. Flaunden Press. ISBN 0951824201.
- Ashby, Margaret (1995). Stevenage Past. Phillimore & Co. ISBN 0850339707.
- Ashby, Margaret; Hepworth, John; Pitcher, June (August 1998). On Foot in the Forster Country. Stevenage Museum.
