= Robert Wilkinson (English cricketer) =

British cricketer and academic

Robert Hindley Wilkinson (1811 – 5 February 1888) was a British academic, and a cricketer with amateur status who was active from 1828 to 1831.

== Life ==
Wilkinson was born in London, the son of Robert Wilkinson and his wife Catherine Allix, daughter of John Peter Allix of Swaffham Prior; the Rev. Charles Allix Wilkinson, the writer, and Isaac Herbert Wilkinson were his brothers, in a family of seven brothers and three sisters. He attended Eton College and was cricket captain there in 1828. He entered King's College, Cambridge, in 1830, graduating B.A. in 1833 and M.A. in 1836. He was a Fellow of King's from 1832 to 1852, and bursar in 1846. Entering Lincoln's Inn in 1835, he was called to the bar in 1838. He was an original member of the Philological Society.

Wilkinson was a magistrate and lieutenant-colonel of militia. He was Lord of the manor of Graveley, Hertfordshire, through his wife Caroline Obert. He died in Hitchin, Hertfordshire.

== Cricketer ==
Wilkinson made his debut in 1831 and appeared in one match as an unknown handedness batsman whose bowling style is unknown, playing for Cambridge University. He scored 51 runs with a highest score of 37 and took no wickets.

== Family ==
In 1852 Wilkinson married Caroline Obert, daughter of Vicomte Obert and his wife Margaret Parkins. They had a son, Edward Obert Hindley Wilkinson, an officer of the 60th Rifles drowned after the battle of Ingogo in 1881. Their daughter Caroline Elizabeth married Charles Poyntz Stewart.

== Rooksnest and the E. M. Forster connection ==
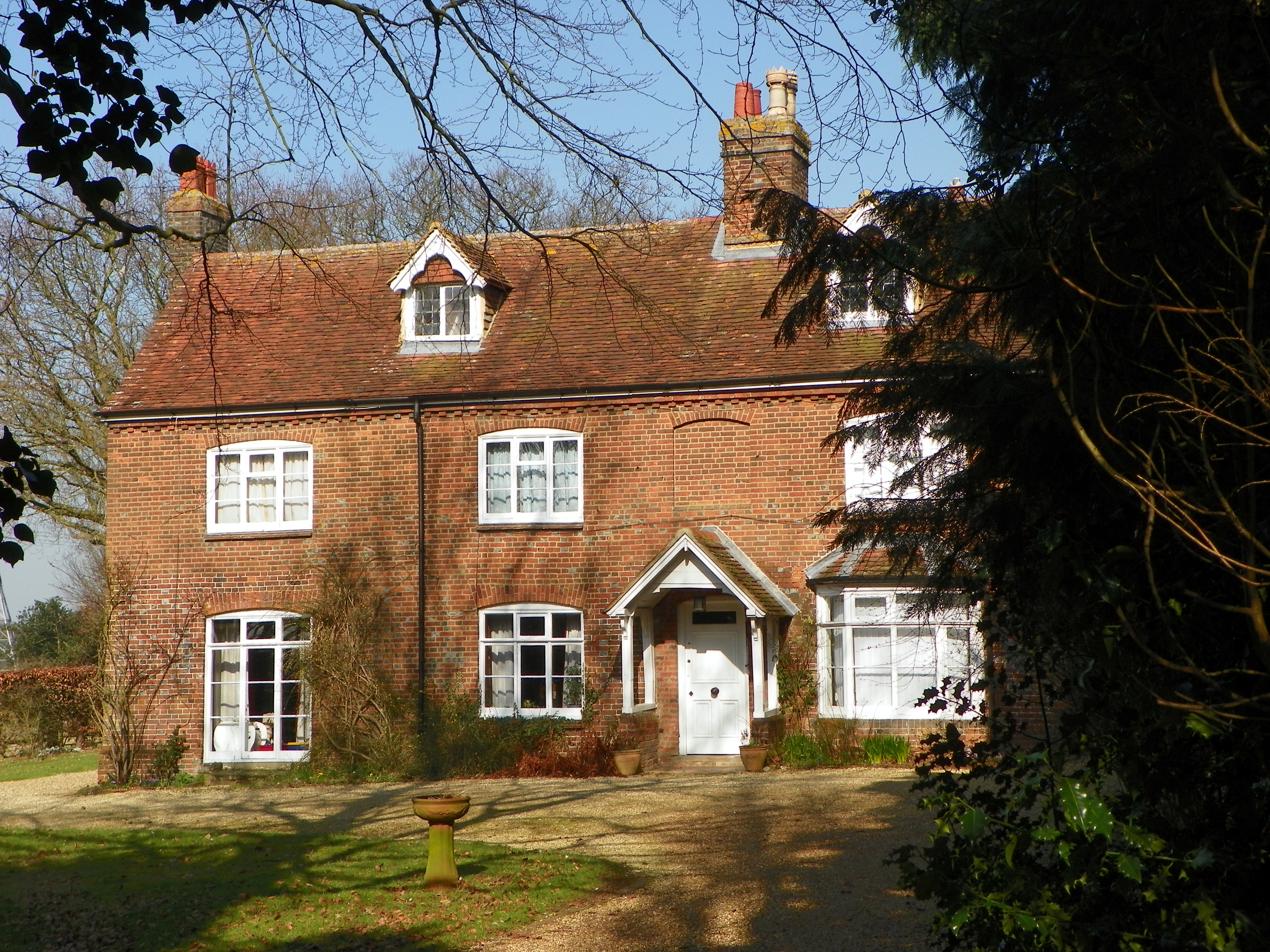
Rook's Nest House today

Wilkinson lived at Chesfield Park on the boundary between the parishes of Graveley and Stevenage. Nearby was a house on Weston Road, Stevenage, which he bought from another local family, the Howards. Between 1883 and 1893 Wilkinson let the house, known as Rooksnest, to the mother of the author E. M. Forster. Lily Forster and her son had to leave, unwillingly, when the Poyntz Stewarts, to whom the property had passed, wished it vacated.

Forster had written a piece about the house, the "Rooksnest memoir", by 1894 when he was 15 which mentions Wilkinson as landlord. Howards End (1910) was his novel about his childhood home; he continued to visit the house into the later 1940s, and he retained the furniture all his life. From 1914 Elizabeth Poston lived there: the Forsters had known the Poston family when they were the residents. The memoir was published with the Penguin Modern Classics edition of Howards End. Another memoir by Forster, from the 1940s and about West Hackhurst, Abinger Hammer in Surrey which was his home from 1925, returns to the associations of Rooksnest.

Rooksnest, now called Rook's Nest House, had once been named Howards. It became a Grade I listed building in 1976.

== Bibliography ==
- Haygarth, Arthur (1996) [1862]. Scores & Biographies, Volume 1 (1744–1826). Kennington: Frederick Lillywhite. ISBN 978-19-00592-23-9.
- Haygarth, Arthur (1997) [1862]. Scores & Biographies, Volume 2 (1827–1840). Kennington: Frederick Lillywhite. ISBN 978-19-00592-23-9.
