= Church of St John the Baptist, Royston, Hertfordshire =

Church in Hertfordshire, England

Coordinates: 52°02′52″N 0°01′21″W

Parish Church of St. John the Baptist and St. Thomas of Canterbury
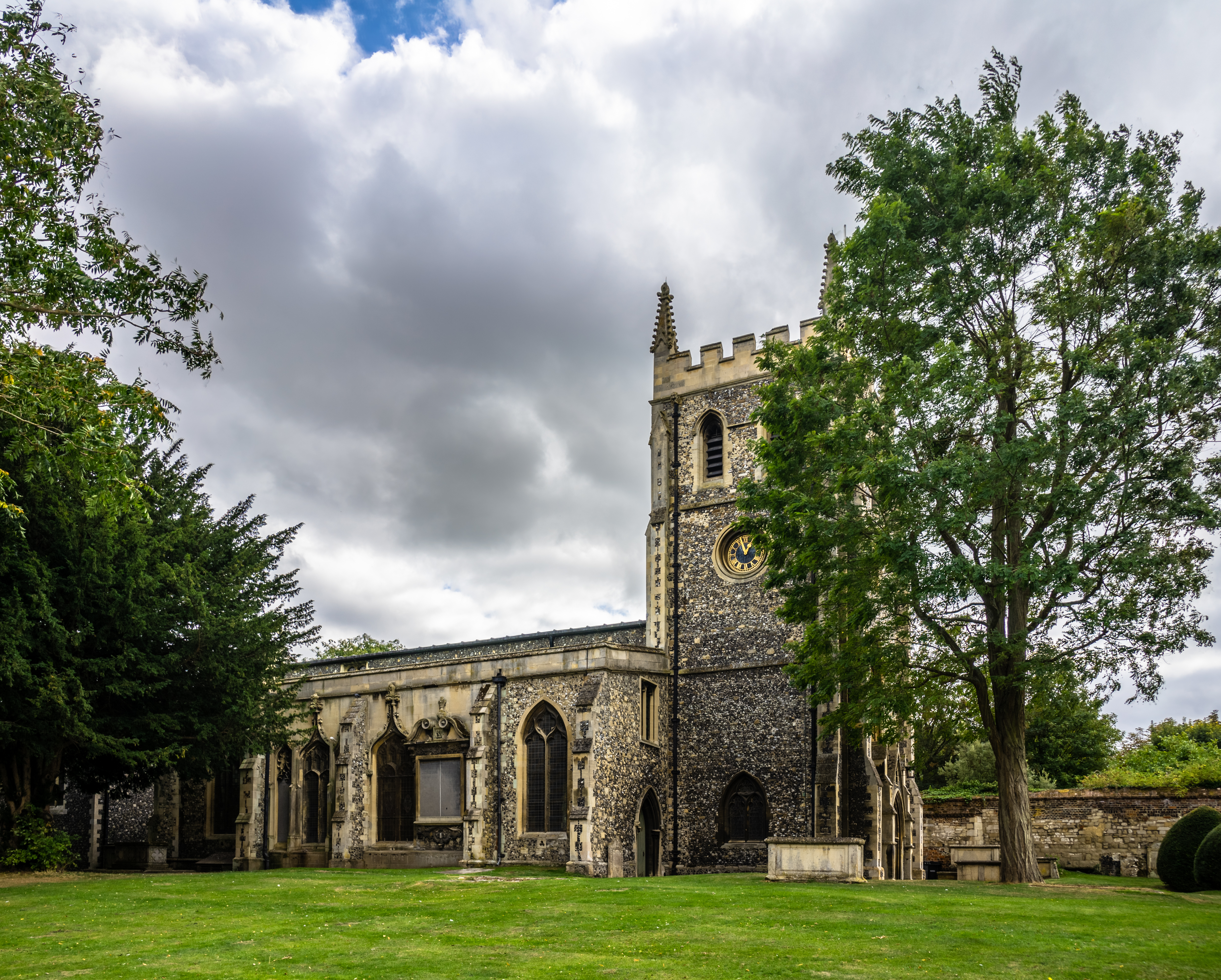
- St. John the Baptist, Royston

- Shown within Hertfordshire
- OS grid reference: TL 35762 40678
- Country: England
- Denomination: Church of England
- Website: roystonparishchurch.org.uk

Architecture
- Heritage designation: Grade I listed building
- Designated: 14 June 1964
- Years built: c1250-1981

Administration
- Province: Canterbury
- Diocese: St Albans
- Archdeaconry: Hertford
- Deanery: Buntingford

The Church of St John the Baptist is an Anglican church in the town of Royston, Hertfordshire, England. The nave and aisles, which were built c. 1250, originally formed the quire and sanctuary of a large church belonging to the Augustinian Priory of Royston. It was converted to a parish church following the Dissolution of the Monasteries.

On 9 December 2018 the church was severely damaged by fire. All eight bells in the tower, three of which dated from 1739, cracked due to the extreme heat. The bells were recast by John Taylor & Co in 2020 and are hung in the original 1901 bell-frame, which survived the blaze.
