= St Nicholas' Church, Stevenage =

Church in Hertfordshire, England

- The Parish Church of St Nicholas
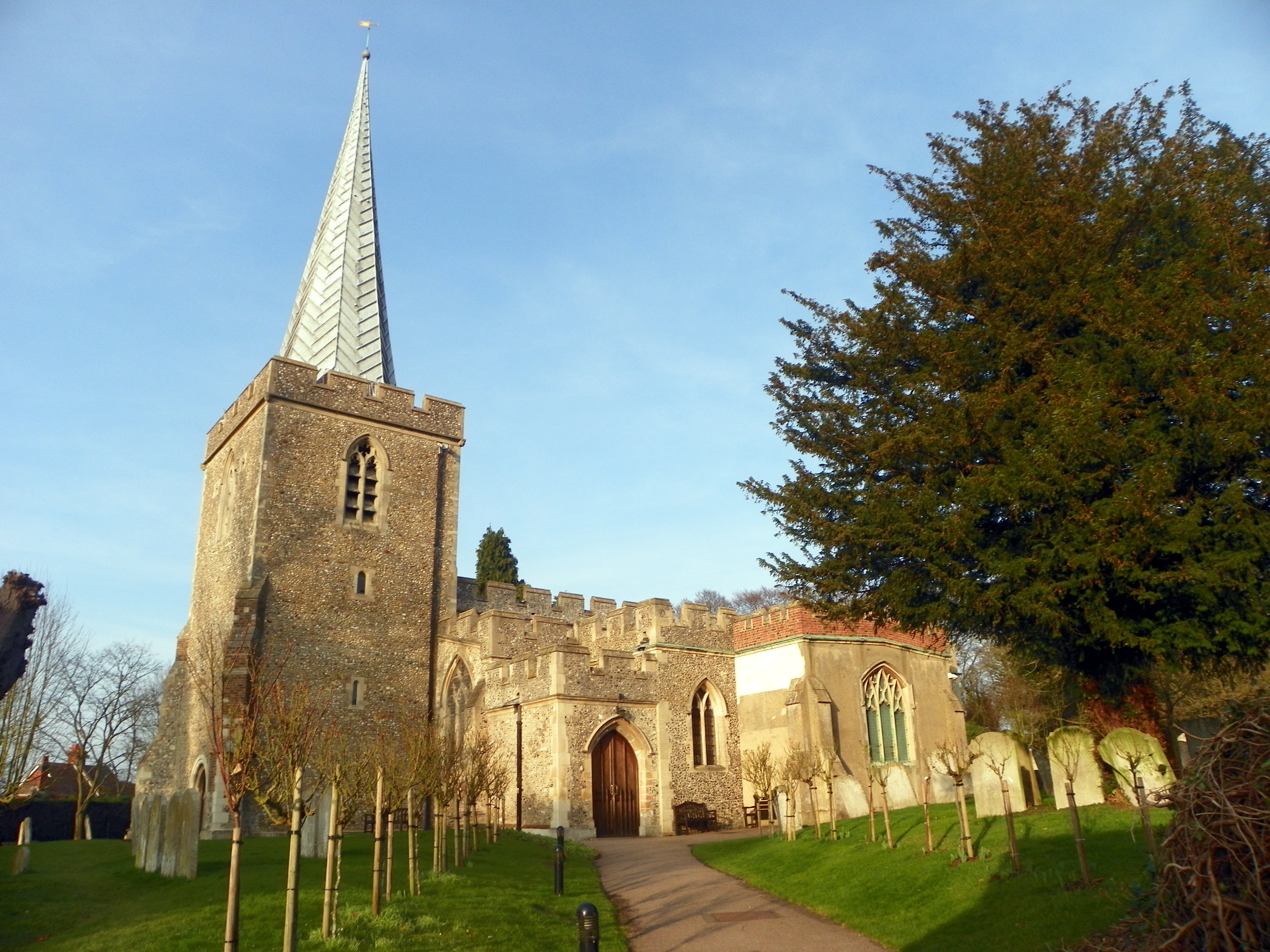
- St Nicholas' Church viewed from the Lych Gate

- Shown within Hertfordshire
- 51.920546°N 0.197298°W
- OS grid reference: TL240262
- Location: Stevenage
- Country: England
- Denomination: Church of England
- Previous denomination: Roman Catholic
- Churchmanship: Evangelical
- Website: www.saintnicholaschurch.org.uk

History
- Status: Parish church
- Dedication: St Nicholas

Architecture
- Functional status: Active
- Heritage designation: Grade I listed building
- Designated: 18 February 1948

Specifications
- Materials: Flint, stone, brick, wood

Administration
- Province: Canterbury
- Diocese: St Albans
- Archdeaconry: Hertford
- Deanery: Stevenage
- Parish: St Nicholas, Stevenage

Clergy
- Vicar: Revd. Edward Keene

St Nicholas' Church is an Anglican parish church in Stevenage, a town in Hertfordshire, England.

It occupies a hilltop site above Old Stevenage. It is a Grade I listed building and is composed of a tower, entrance porch, nave, north and south aisles, choir, Lady chapel, Trinity chapel, and vestry.

== History ==
The earliest settlement in Stevenage was on the site of the present St Nicholas' Church. It was likely established in the 7th century. This Saxon village of wooden huts may have been centered around a small wooden church on a hilltop, or may have been a more scattered collection of farmsteads. It was at this time that the name "Stevenage" emerged, with early variants including "Stigenace" and "Stithenace" in the 11th century, the meaning of which is generally accepted as "at the stiff or strong oak", though some scholars favour "at the strong gate". In Saxon times, England was divided into parishes, each with its church and a rector or vicar. The boundaries of Stevenage parish were defined at about 1100 and were unchanged for 850 years. The church in this time was enlarged and embellished. Parishes were organised into dioceses; Stevenage was in the Diocese of Lincoln. At this time, England was part of the Roman Catholic Church in Europe.

In the early 12th century (probably around 1120, though perhaps as early as 1100), a thick-walled flint tower was built onto the church, where villagers could find refuge, and fire arrows at attackers through the narrow windows, and the Saxon church was replaced by Norman one. The flints, sourced from hills to the north of the town, were knapped to produce smooth faces, and set into lime mortar. The tower also contains Hertfordshire puddingstone, brownish-white quartzite and speckled black and white volcanic rock. In the 13th century, the town moved away from the church to the Great North Road. Most of the church was completely rebuilt at this time, leaving just the tower, which is now the oldest part of the church. Traces of an earlier nave, which predates the tower, can be found on the eastern face of the tower. Expansion of Stevenage in the 15th century is shown by expansion of the church at the same time. At this time, the aisles were widened, the chancel was rebuilt, and the spire was added in the second half of the 15th century. The church was remote from the main settlement of Stevenage but also served many hamlets and farmsteads.

In the 16th century, Protestant groups emerged, and Catholics and Protestants persecuted each other. There was religious upheaval during the reigns of Henry VIII, Edward VI and Mary I, from Henry's break with Rome in 1535 to Mary's death in 1558. Stevenage had as its rector at this time the Reverend Thomas Alleyne, who was respected and loved by his parishioners, who saw him as a father figure. The Church of England (Anglican Church) emerged from these tumultuous years. Alleyne was a Protestant, and Stevenage was probably Protestant in its outlook, as much of Hertfordshire was at this time. Stevenage became part of the Diocese of London. During the English Civil War, the church suffered the loss of stained glass windows, murals were whitewashed and ornaments were destroyed by Roundhead supporters.

In 1841, the number of seats in the church was increased from 314 to 634, but this was still inadequate as the population of Stevenage was 1850. As Stevenage expanded in the 1850s, a new church was needed as the population reached 2118. In 1861, a chapel-of-ease, the Holy Trinity Church, was built for the residents of new roads in the south of Stevenage who objected to the long walk to St Nicholas' Church, especially as they would often find the church was full. In 1877, Stevenage was placed in the Diocese of St Albans. St Nicholas' Church was designated a Grade I listed building on 18 February 1948.

Stevenage was designated the first new town in 1946 (the first new town built in England following World War II). Those concerned with the new town realised that new centres for people to meet were needed to create a sense of community, so several new churches were to be built. In 1955, the Reverend Eric Cordingly became rector of Stevenage and led the development and reorganisation of the Church of England in Stevenage. Each neighbourhood of the town would have its own church building and priest-in-charge, and there would be one large, centrally located church as the parish church for the town, St George's (later St Andrew and St George's), to which the title of rector would be attached. St George's took over from St Nicholas' as the civic church of the town. St Nicholas' and its daughter church, the Holy Trinity, became daughter churches of St George's, leading to sarcastic remarks that the daughter was older than the mother, and resentment that the ancient church had been casually demoted.

In 1970, the ecclesiastical parish of Stevenage was divided into seven parishes, each with its own church and vicar (though St George's retained the title of rector), so St Nicholas' regained its parish church status. In 1998, the benefice of St Nicholas was joined with that of St Mary, Graveley.

== Clergy ==
The earliest known rector of Stevenage is Nicholas Fitz-Simon, who was appointed in 1213. Notable incumbents who left their mark on the town include Stephen Hellard, who bequeathed a set of almshouses to the town, rent-free, provided the residents commended his soul to God every day, and Thomas Alleyne, who left funds in his will for a free grammar school, which, combined with that of a yeoman, Edward Wilshire, provided The Thomas Alleyne School in 1558, surviving today as The Thomas Alleyne Academy.

In 1960, the new parish church of St George was consecrated and St Nicholas became a district church in the care of a priest-in-charge. In 1970, the parish of Stevenage was divided into seven separate parishes, and St Nicholas regained its status as a parish church, with the incumbent having the title of vicar. In 1998, the benefice of St Nicholas was joined with that of St Mary, Graveley, so from that date, each incumbent was vicar of St Nicholas and St Mary.

Rectors of Stevenage
| Name | Appointed | Appointment ended | Note |
|---|---|---|---|
| Nicholas Fitz-Simon | 1213 | Unknown | |
| William de Berkhamsted | Unknown | Unknown | |
| Adam de Boxgrave | 1255 | Unknown | |
| Henry de Borham | Unknown | Unknown | |
| Gerald de Standon | 15 March 1276 | Unknown | |
| Richard de Gloucester | 5 December 1314 | Unknown | |
| John de Michaeldeane | 8 January 1328 | Unknown | |
| Philip de Westone | 1333 | Unknown | |
| Robert de Lee | 1340 | Unknown | |
| Robert atte Brome | 1350 | Unknown | |
| William Tankerville | 1373 | Unknown | |
| John Dyne | 1382 | Unknown | |
| John de Newton | 1393 | Unknown | |
| John de Belverge | 1395 | Unknown | |
| John Rowland | February 1397 | 1408 | |
| John Lawrence | July 1408 | Unknown | |
| William Brewster | Unknown | Unknown | |
| John Pygge | August 1432 | Unknown | |
| Stephen Hellard | July 1472 | 1500 (died) | |
| William Blackwell | September 1506 | Unknown | |
| Thomas Alleyne | Unknown | 1558 (died) | |
| John Battie | 1558 | Unknown | |
| John Sterne | 1577 | Unknown | |
| Robert Pattinson | 1578 | Unknown | |
| William Pratt | December 1579 | 1629 (died) | |
| Robert Chester | 1633 | April 1664 (died) | |
| Stafford Leventhorpe | May 1664 | October 1678 (died) | |
| Richard Shoard | January 1678 | Unknown | |
| Fulke Tudor | April 1680 | 1688 (died) | |
| Josiah Bentham | April 1689 | April 1723 (died) | |
| Charles Baron | September 1723 | October 1725 (died) | |
| Thomas Stamper | November 1725 | October 1733 (died) | |
| Robert Style | February 1734 | 1737 (died) | |
| Nicholas Cholwell | 1737 | September 1773 (died) | |
| Samuel Hemming | November 1773 | 1781 (resigned) | |
| Henry Baker | March 1781 | 1833 (died) | |
| Robert George Baker | 1833 | 1834 | Cousin of the above |
| George Becher Blomfield | 1834 | 1874 (resigned) | Canon of Chester |
| William Jowitt | 1874 | 1912 | Father of William Jowitt, 1st Earl Jowitt |
| Henry William Eliot Molony | 1912 | 1918 | Canon of St Albans |
| Charles Morgan Smith | 1918 | 1945 | Canon of St Albans |
| John Humphrey King | 1945 | 1954 | |
| Eric William Bradley Cordingly | 1955 | 1962 | Chaplain to the Queen |
| Stanley Seart Sutton | 1962 | 1969 | |
Priests-in-charge of St Nicholas
| Eric Arthur Gaskell | 1960 | 1966 (resigned) | |
| John Trevor Scott | 1966 | 1969 (resigned) | |
| Christopher James Weston | 1970 | 1971 (became vicar, see below) | |
Vicars of St Nicholas
| Christopher James Weston | 1971 | 1987 (resigned) | |
| John Richard Bainbridge | 1987 | 1999 (resigned) | |
| Donald Edward Dowling | 1999 | 2010 (resigned) | |
| David Mark Brown | 2011 | | |
| Edward Keene | | (present) | |

== Architecture and fittings ==
The church now comprises the tower, an entrance porch, nave, north and south aisles, choir, Lady chapel, Trinity chapel and vestry. The square-shaped font dates to the early 13th century and has a medieval carved wooden cover. The tower's walls are 5 feet (1.5 m) thick on three sides at the base and 3 feet 7 inches (1.09 m) at the top. It measures 24 feet 7 inches (7.49 m) by 22 feet 1 inch (6.73 m) and is aligned about 12.5° west of north. The church is entirely embattled.

The wooden church attached to the 12th century stone tower was replaced in the 13th century. Aisles were added circa 1230, and the present chancel was built in around 1330, the aisles were widened and the font was installed. The interior was decorated with paintings and stained glass, and it had a decorated roof and a gilded and painted screen between the chancel and the nave. Faint traces of murals dating to this period can still be seen. A spire of the traditional Hertfordshire design was added to the tower in the 14th or 15th century. The roof may have been raised and later lowered, evidenced by the presence of a door high on the tower, above the present roof, which presumably enclosed a higher nave roof.

Around 1836, the walls were damp from soil accumulating on the outside walls to a height of 4 feet (1.2 m) above the floor of the interior, so the soil was removed, leaving a ditch 5 feet (1.5 m) wide, a low wall was built to keep the ditch banks up and the ditch was paved with bricks. Following this, repairs were carried out to the tower; the spire was repaired and re-leaded, the battlements were restored, a cornice was run around the tower, the windows and doors were repaired and the whole surface of the tower was repaired.

In 1841, the north-east vestry, south transept (since converted to a parish room) and south porch were added, and the pews were replaced. The rector at the time, George Becher Blomfield, set about repairing leaks and draughts, and had a musicians' gallery at the west end of the church and its two supporting pillars removed to enable the repairs, and they were not replaced. The pillars were moved to a coaching inn on the High Street where they remain to this day. The entire ceiling was coloured to resemble oak; the chancel ceiling of plain plaster was taken down and renewed with transverse beams supported by angels painted in fresco. Two concealed windows were discovered in the chancel with the mullions and tracery nearly perfect, as were the remains of three sedilia and a double piscina. The damaged font was repaired and moved.

In 1914, the rector, Canon Molony, set about to restore the church where "the rain has been streaming down the inside walls in the south-west corner of the transept and the boarding of the nave has required further temporary repairs in order to save people from going through the flooring." The south aisle was enlarged at around this time.

The tower houses eight bells, though in a 1553 list of church goods, four bells were listed, and it was increased to six before 1700. The church also contains six 14th- or 15th-century oak misericords, including one with a carved image of a woman with a branks in her mouth (though sometimes interpreted as a Green Man) and another of an angel. Three of the others have foliage carved on them, and the sixth is plain.

An organ was installed in 1836, and it was enlarged in 1858, however, a new organ was erected in 1885. Alterations were made in the church for the new organ and new choir stalls. The brass lectern was presented to the church in 1871. There are nine stained glass windows in the church. A carved reredos dates from 1890. The oak pews installed in 1964 are by Robert (Mouseman) Thompson. St Nicholas' Church underwent redecoration in 2009, and the parish room was refurbished in the 2010s with a kitchen and two upstairs toilets.

== Memorials ==
St Nicholas' Church has been called "unremarkable" within the county of Hertfordshire in that it has fewer medieval monuments and memorials than other parishes. It contains six visible surviving monuments from the Middle Ages, five of them were brasses set into stone slabs. The only surviving brass is a memorial to Stephen Hellard, who was rector of Stevenage from 1472 until his death in 1506, and is buried in the church. The brass is in the north of the altar and shows Hellard dressed as a priest in his vestments. It was inscribed while Hellard was alive with a space left for his death date, but the inscription was not completed. The remaining brasses are missing with only indents remaining on the slabs and the details of any inscriptions were never recorded. The sixth is a late-13th century stone effigy of a lady with hands raised in prayer at the east end of the north aisle. It is described as one of the "less common but most fascinating sepulchral devices". It is fragmented into four parts. It was discovered in 1824 being used as a doorstep to the south aisle, and was in good condition having been placed upside down, perhaps for centuries. The colours were preserved but have since faded, and the carving has worn, but a drawing of it was made upon its discovery, showing how it looked at the time. The lady is supported by two figures; it is generally accepted that the right figure is of a priest, the other may be an angel, a priest or a gentleman. There is no evidence as to the lady's identity, and it is not known whether the effigy would have originally been set on top of a tomb or within a wall.

Among the wall memorials in the church are a carved marble wall monument to Charles Gibbon dating to 1771, and a brass tablet that was placed on the wall at the south end of the communion rail to notify the esteem in which the Canon Blomfield, rector from 1834 to 1874, was held, by both friends and parishioners, after his death in 1885. Above the door in the north aisle is a memorial tablet, described as the most stylish of the church's memorials, to Lieutenant Jellicoe Turner and his wife Georgiana Elizabeth Turner, who died in 1844 and 1831 respectively. Lt. Turner had paid for the church organ and tower repairs in 1836. A memorial plaque was dedicated to William Jowitt, 1st Earl Jowitt in 1991. Each of the nine stained glass windows contains a monumental inscription.

Other wall tablets and memorials inside the church include:

- George Becher Blomfield (died 1885), Canon of Chester and rector of Stevenage 1834–1874
- Frances Maria Blomfield (died 1837), wife of the Reverend George Becher Blomfield
- Sara Bowcocke (1628–1660), wife of Richard Bowcocke, daughter of John Nodes, mother of two daughters, one abortive, the other Sara
- Ivon Gordon Fellowes (died 1915), youngest son of Rear Admiral Sir Thomas Hounsom Butler Fellowes, killed in action aboard HMS Irresistible aged 17
- Captain Rupert Caldwell Butler Fellowes (died 1918), third son of Rear Admiral Sir Thomas Hounsom Butler Fellowes, killed in action in France aged 24
- William Jowitt (1834–1912), rector of Stevenage 1874–1912; and Louisa Margaret Jowitt (1840–1926), his wife
- Captain Sidney Henry Lowry (died 1917), killed in action in Flanders aged 29
- Henry William Eliot Molony, Canon of St Albans and rector of Stevenage 1912–1918
- William Pratt (died 1629), rector of Stevenage 1579–1629; Latin inscription

Angela Godfrey's Only Connect monument to E. M. Forster, who lived in the nearby Rooks Nest and after whom the area to the north of the church known as Forster Country was named, stands at the edge of the churchyard, and marks the entrance to Forster Country. It is the world's only monument to Forster. The monument was commissioned by the Friends of the Forster Country, funded jointly by Stevenage Borough Council and Hertfordshire County Council, and unveiled by Stevenage's then MP, Barbara Follett, on 29 November 1997. The title is in acknowledgement of the subtitle of Forster's novel Howards End. It was carved in Watts Cliff Stone, a Millstone Grit rich in plagioclase which gives it a lilac colour, from a quarry near Elton, Derbyshire.

== Graffiti ==
St Nicholas' Church contains a "surprising" number of drawings on its pillars, giving insight into the minds of the medieval inhabitants of Stevenage. The graffiti has been described as among the finest of their kind in Hertfordshire, if not in all the "chalk churches" in eastern England, and can be regarded as just as important as the plague writings of Ashwell church's graffiti. The graffiti in the nave could date to as early as the 12th century, while some probably dates to the 17th or 18th century. They are in the form of masons' marks, geometric designs, human figures, shields, crosses and writing.

== Churchyard ==
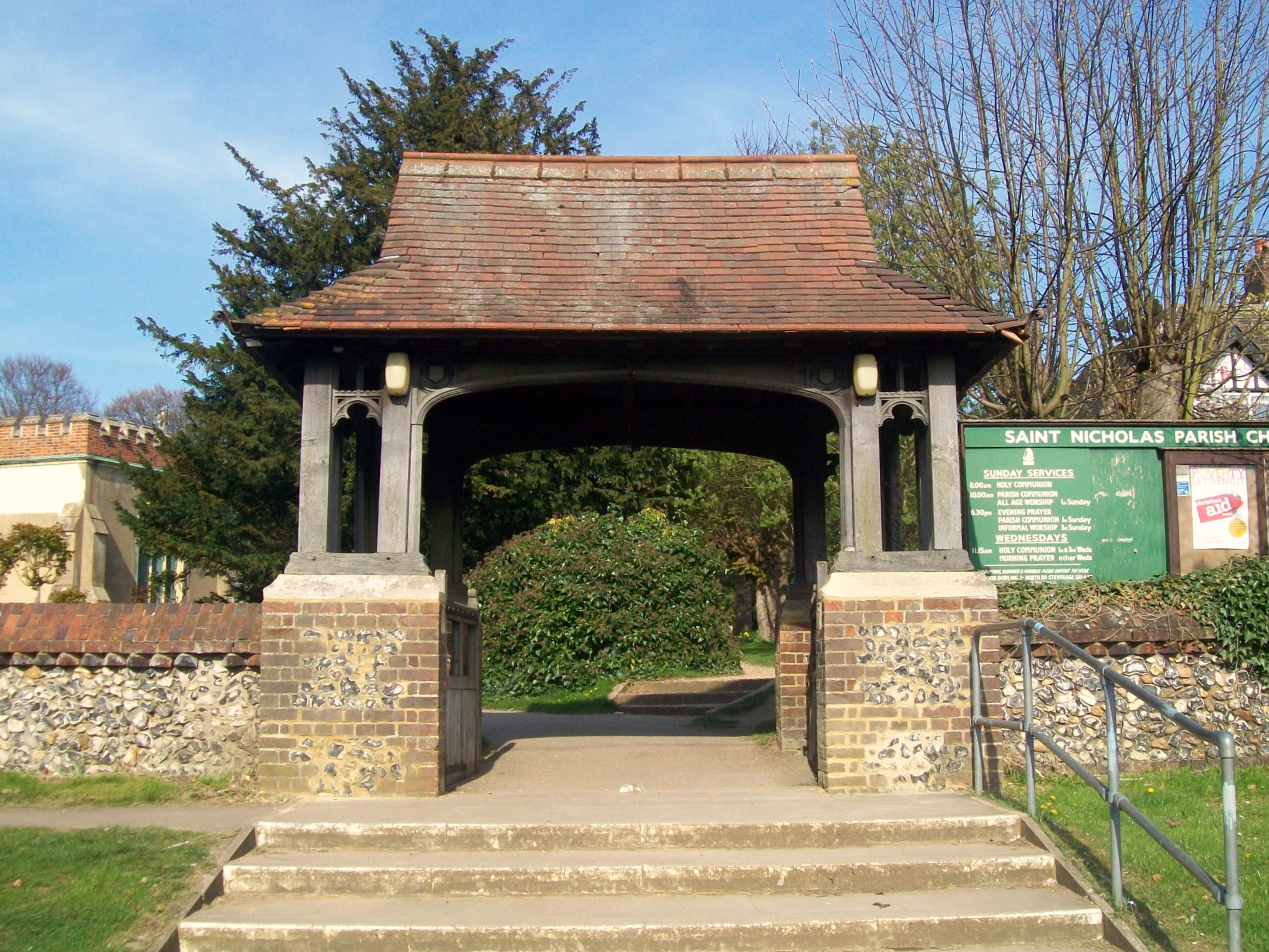
The lychgate

The churchyard has existed since the original church was on the same site. It has been enlarged several times. In 1862, about 0.75 acres (0.30 ha) of land was purchased by parishioners and added to the churchyard. Further land was added on the eastern side of the churchyard c.1895. The most recent expansion was in 1930 and it is now 3.5 acres (1.4 ha). The churchyard is now closed to burials but adjoins a municipal cemetery to the east. The lychgate at the entrance to the churchyard was erected in 1895, after Mrs George Smyth left money in her will devoted to the expense of doing so.

The monumental inscriptions in the churchyard (and within the church) have been recorded three times, in 1908, 1962 and 1985. In 1985, 1,275 inscriptions were recorded in the churchyard, and a further 19 were recorded in 1962 that were not found in 1985. Among those buried in the churchyard are Albert and Ebenezer Fox. There are a small number of war graves, maintained by the War Graves Commission.

The churchyard is in a conservation area and plays an important part in the countryside by acting as a refuge for birds, mammals, insects and plants including goldilocks buttercup, meadow saxifrage and lady's smock. Old beech trees line the footpath to Forster's monument. Other trees planted in the churchyard include large-leaved lime, Swedish whitebeam, Norway maple, copper beech, English oak, hornbeam, false acacia, Indian bean, Turkey oak, ornamental crab, white cherry and mountain ash, many of which were planted in memory of various people. The churchyard is maintained by the church from bequests and contributions from the parishioners and Stevenage Borough Council.
