= Elizabeth Poston =

English composer (1905–1987)

Elizabeth Poston

Elizabeth Poston (24 October 1905 – 18 March 1987) was an English composer, pianist, organist, and writer.

== Early life and career ==
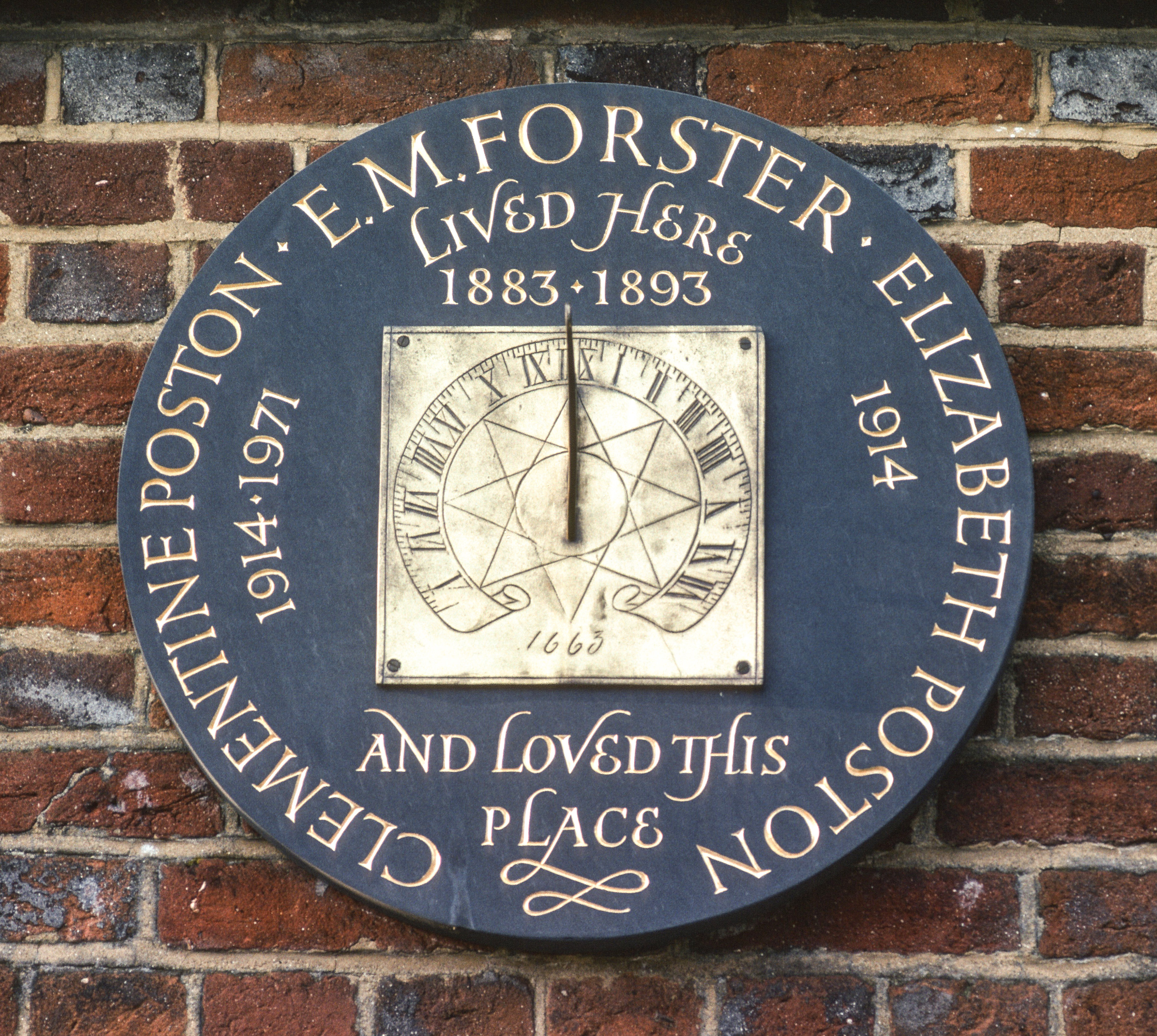
Plaque designed by Bob Duvivier at Rooks Nest, the former home which was the inspiration for Howards End in E M Forster's novel.

Poston was born in Highfield House in Pin Green, which is now the site of Hampson Park in Stevenage. In 1914 she moved with her mother, Clementine Poston, to nearby Rooks Nest House where E. M. Forster had lived as a child. Poston and Forster subsequently became good friends. After attending Queen Margaret's School, York and studying piano with Harold Samuel and organ with Sir Stanley Marchant, she attended the Royal Academy of Music (RAM) in London, where both Peter Warlock and Ralph Vaughan Williams encouraged her talents and where she studied composition with Julius Harrison. She won a prize from the RAM for her one movement Violin Sonata, which was subsequently broadcast by the BBC on 9 July 1928, with Antonio Brosa as soloist and Victor Hely-Hutchinson piano.

When she graduated from the RAM in 1925 seven of her songs were published, and in 1928 she published five more. Poston went abroad between 1930 and 1939, where she studied architecture and collected folksongs in Central Europe. She was also a respected performer, premiering Walter Leigh’s Concertino for harpsichord and strings in 1934.

== Wartime and the BBC ==
When she returned to England at the beginning of World War II Poston joined the BBC and became director of music in the European Service. During the war she is said to have carried out secretive work as an agent, using contacts she had made over her past decade of travel. At the BBC she apparently used gramophone records to send coded messages to allies in Europe. Poston's discussion with Julius Harrison, composer of Bredon Hill which is "witness to the eternal spirit of England", was aired by the BBC in 1942. She also played the piano at the National Gallery lunchtime concerts organised by Myra Hess.

Poston left the BBC briefly in 1945, but returned in 1946 at the invitation of Douglas Cleverdon to advise on the creation of the BBC Third Programme. She subsequently became one of the youngest composers to be represented on the network at its opening, with her incidental music for John Milton's Comus.

== Composition ==
Poston composed scores for radio and television productions – over 40 for radio alone – and collaborated with C. S. Lewis, Dylan Thomas, Terence Tiller and other writers. She wrote the score for the 1970 BBC television production of Howards End (broadcast on 26 December 1970 as Play of the Month, now lost) while living in Rooks Nest House, which was the setting for the novel.

Her carols, especially Jesus Christ the Apple Tree (1967) and The Boar's Head Carol (1960), remain widely performed. The Nativity (1950), a sequence of newly composed carols and adaptations from folk songs or Medieval manuscripts retelling the Christmas Story, was premiered as a radio feature produced by Terence Tiller, but had an afterlife as a choral work for concert performance. It's one of two extended choral works of hers to have been recorded. The other is An English Day Book, a 20-minute sequence of sacred and profane poetry settings relating to different times of the day and year. This work includes a setting of Sweet Suffolk Owl by Thomas Vautor that has achieved separate popularity. A new recording was issued in 2024. There are also anthems, mostly dating from the 1950s, such as the four movement Song of Wisdom (1956), written for Yardley Grammar School in Birmingham.

The Concertino da camera on a Theme of Martin Peerson (1957) is a significant example of her music for chamber ensembles, and has been recorded. A Swiss radio broadcast of her 1960 Trio for flute, viola and harp can be heard on YouTube, and a new recording of the Trio by the Korros Ensemble was released in 2021. A six-minute work for string orchestra, Blackberry Fold: Requiem for a Dog, received its first broadcast in February 1976.

In total there are over 300 compositions, some still to be discovered. Poston's extensive archives are now housed at the Hertfordshire Archives and Local Studies in Hertford.

== Writing and editing ==
In addition to composing, Poston was an academic, writer and editor. In 1947 she created a five-part lecture series on Peter Warlock for the BBC. Much later, she defended his reputation in a very personal broadcast talk.

She wrote articles and programme notes for the Arts Council of Great Britain and was the editor of a number of vocal music anthologies, including The Children's Song Book (1961), which was described as "a little autobiography, reflecting her own delight in songs since the earliest she remembers from the age of two". The book contains five of her own original settings, including a short song version of Jesus Christ the Apple Tree that was the germ of her famous choral piece, fully realised six years later. There were also three Penguin collections – The Penguin Book of Christmas Carols (two volumes, 1965 and 1971), and (with Alan Lomax) The Penguin Book of American Folksongs (1964) – as well as (with David Holbrook) The Cambridge Hymnal (1970).

== Later career ==
Poston was the president of the Society of Women Musicians 1955–1961.

She continued to live at Rooks Nest House until her death at the age of 81 in 1987. A catalogue of her works by her friend Dr John Alabaster published in 2018 lists some two dozen of her compositions considered lost. One of them, the Festal Te Deum, first performed in 1959, was rediscovered in 2018.

== Selected music for BBC Radio and Television ==
- A Parsonage in the Hesperides (Robert Herrick, producer Douglas Cleverdon): Home Service, 20 September 1944)
- The Elizabethans (producer Douglas Cleverdon): Home Service, 16 January 1946
- Comus (John Milton, Henry Lawes): Third Programme, 30 September 1946
- The Spear of Gold (L.A.G. Strong): Third Programme, 26 November 1946
- In Parenthesis (David Jones): Third Programme, 13 December 1946
- The Life and Death of Dr John Donne (producer Douglas Cleverdon): Third Programme. 21 May 1947
- Paradise Lost (Milton, producer John Cleverdon): 12 programmes, Third Programme, 27 October - 21 December 1947
- The Death of Adam (producer Terence Tiller): Third Programme, 24 October 1949
- Lilith (producer Terence Tiller): Third Programme, 2 September 1950
- The Nativity (producer Terence Tiller): Third Programme, 26 December 1950
- The Holy Child (producer Terence Tiller): Third Programme, 20 February 1952
- Emperor and Galilean (Henrik Ibsen, producer Raymond Raikes): Third Programme, 17 May 1953
- Chastelard (Algernon Charles Swinburne): Third Programme, 27 February 1954
- Sheba (Bridget Boland): Home Service, 6 January 1955
- Diarmuid and Grainne (Padraic Fallon): Third Programme, 22 January 1956
- Sonata Form of Words (Jean Morris): Third Programme, 2 January 1962
- St Teresa of Avila (Hugh Ross Williamson): Network Three, 9 February 1966
- Harold (Tennyson): Home Service, 10 October 1966
- Mandragola (Machiavelli): Radio 3, 27 October 1967
- The Idylls of the King (Tennyson): Radio 3, 2 February 1968)
- After Ten Years (C.S.Lewis, producer Terence Tiller): Radio 3, 9 March 1969
- Howards End (E.M.Forster): BBC One Television, 26 December 1970
- The Batchelors Banquet (Thomas Dekker, producer Terence Tiller): Radio 3, 20 June 1971
- Sweet England's Pride (Alison Plowden): Radio 4, 14 November 1971
- A Room with a View (E.M.Forster): BBC One Television, 15 April 1973
- The Last Temptation (Nikos Kazantzakis): Radio 4, 16 September 1973
- The Girl Who Lost Her Glove (Penelope Shuttle): Radio 4, 4 March 1975
- For God and for Profit (Iris Origo): Three programmes on life in medieval Tuscany, Radio 3, 20 March - 3 April 1978
- Liberty Comes to Krahwinkel (Johann Nestroy): Radio 3, 28 August 1983
