= Moor Place, Hertfordshire =

Country house in Hertfordshire, England

Coordinates: 51°51′03″N 0°03′45″E

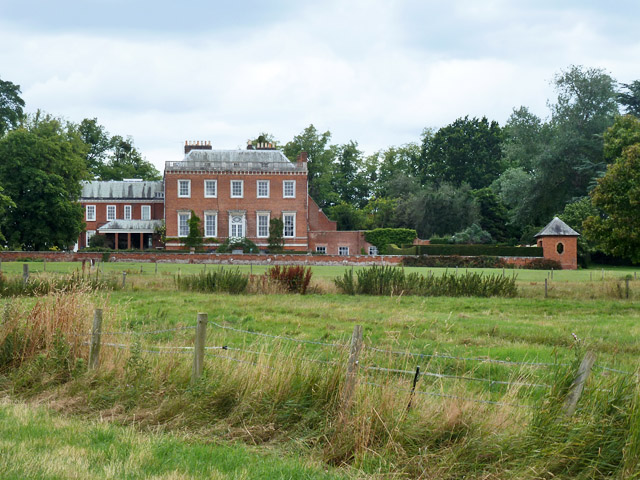
Moor Place in 2015

Moor Place is a country house within the civil parish of Much Hadham, in the East Hertfordshire district, in the county of Hertfordshire, England. It is designated in the National Heritage List for England as a Grade I listed building. The house was built between 1775 and 1779 for James Brebner Gordon by the architect Robert Mitchell.
