= St Mary's Church, Hemel Hempstead =

Church in Hertfordshire, England

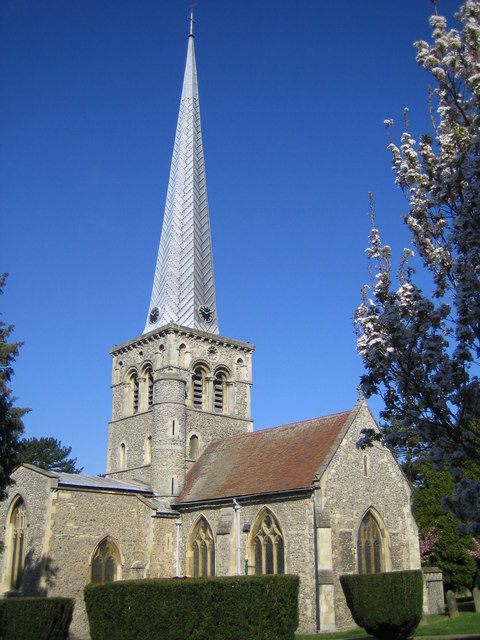
- St Mary's Church, Hemel Hempstead. View, from the south east showing the chancel, south transept, tower and spire.
- St Mary's Church, Hemel Hempstead
- 51.7591°N 0.4727°W
- Denomination: Church of England
- Churchmanship: Liberal Catholic

History
- Dedication: St. Mary

Administration
- Province: Canterbury
- Diocese: St Albans
- Deanery: Hemel Hempstead
- Parish: St Mary & St Paul

Clergy
- Vicar: Canon John Williams

St Mary's Church, Hemel Hempstead in Hertfordshire, England is the parish church of the town and its oldest place of worship. It is a Grade I listed building.

== History ==
A Saxon coffin was discovered in the churchyard in 1836, with an inscription on the lid claiming it to be that of King Offa of the Mercians. This supports speculation that a Saxon church once occupied the site. The coffin is unfortunately now lost.

Construction of the present building commenced in 1140 and the church was dedicated in 1150, although construction continued for another 30 years. It is not known why such a grand church was constructed in what at the time was a small hamlet.

The building is cruciform in shape, with a chancel (the first part to be built), a nave, south and north transepts, and a tower. A spire, at 200 feet one of the tallest in Europe, was added in the 14th century. It is topped by a gilded weather vane. A 19th-century vestry was added on the church's north-east corner. The church is built from the local clunch stone and flint with some addition of Roman bricks. The architecture is Norman throughout apart from porches added in the 14th and 15th centuries.

In 1302, a cell to Ashridge Priory was founded in Hemel Hempstead and the church had collegiate status until the Dissolution of the monasteries in 1536. A door at the base of the tower enabled the monks to access the church without having to mix with the townspeople.

The church contains a memorial to Sir Astley Paston Cooper. It has an organ made by Walker organ, which was refurbished in 2008.

A ring of five bells was recorded in the reign of Edward VI. None of these remain and the present ring is of eight bells dating from 1590 to 1767. In 1950, as part of the church's 800th anniversary, the bells were retuned by Gillett and Johnston of Croydon and rehung on steel frames with completely new fittings. The eight bells are inscribed as follows:

1. (Treble) Lester and Pack – 1758

2. Lester and Pack – 1758

3. Chandler made me – 1688

4. Praise the Lord – 1633

5. Lawdate Domini – undated

6. God save King James – 1604

7. Sana Manet Christi – 1617

8. (Tenor) Lester and Pack – 1767

The font is original Norman, although surrounded by 19th-century decoration.
