= St James' Church, Stanstead Abbotts =

Coordinates: 51.7807°N 0.0276°E

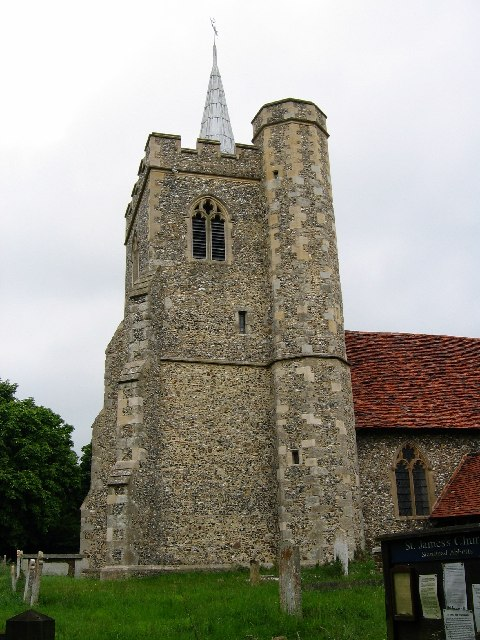
- Tower of St James' Church, Stanstead Abbotts, from the south

- Location in Hertfordshire
- OS grid reference: TL 39972 11061
- Location: Stanstead Abbotts, Hertfordshire
- Country: England
- Denomination: Anglican
- Website: Churches Conservation Trust

Architecture
- Functional status: Redundant
- Heritage designation: Grade I
- Designated: 24 January 1967
- Architectural type: Church
- Style: Gothic

Specifications
- Materials: Flint and brick, with tiled roofs

St James' Church is a redundant Anglican church near the village of Stanstead Abbotts, Hertfordshire, England. It is recorded in the National Heritage List for England (NHLE) as a Grade I listed building, having been designated in 1967. The church is under the care of the Churches Conservation Trust. The church is about 1 mile (1.6 km) to the southeast of the village on the north side of the B181 road. It stands on the top of a hill overlooking the Lea marshes.

The description in the NHLE states it is "of outstanding interest as a medieval church with an unrestored 18th-century interior". In the Buildings of England series, the architectural historian Nikolaus Pevsner wrote "Inside there are few churches in the county which have so well preserved an 18th-century village character".

== History ==
The nave probably dates from the 12th century, and the chancel from the following century. The tower and porch were built in the 15th century, and the northeast chapel was added in 1577. In 1881 a new church, dedicated to Saint Andrew, was built nearer to the village centre and this superseded St James'.

== Architecture ==
=== Exterior ===
The main building material used is flint rubble with stone dressings. There is brickwork in the northeast chapel and in the east wall of the chancel. Some Roman tiles have been incorporated in the flint walls. The roofs are tiled, and the porch is timber-framed. Its plan consists of a nave and chancel under one roof without any structural division, a northeast chapel, a south porch, and a west tower. The tower is in two stages with angle buttresses at the west corners. At the southeast angle is a projecting octagonal stair turret which rises higher than the tower. In the west wall is a doorway with a three-light window above it. There are two-light bell openings on each side.

At the top of the tower is a battlemented parapet and a small lead-covered spire. In the north wall of the nave is a blocked doorway, but no windows. The chapel has a small west door, two two-light windows in the north wall, and a three-light window on the east side. The east window of the chancel also has three lights. There are two two-light windows in the south wall of both the chancel and the nave. All the windows are Perpendicular in style. The south porch is gabled with cusped bargeboards. The lower part of the sides is boarded, and the upper part is open. The south doorway dates from the 13th century.

=== Interior ===
The interior of the church is whitewashed. The tower arch dates from the early 15th century. The north arcade has four bays carried on octagonal piers. The circular font dates from the 13th century, and is carried on a 15th century pedestal. The 16th-century two-decker pulpit stands on the south wall. On the east walls of the chapel are royal arms and commandment boards. In the chancel is a 13th-century double piscina. In the nave are three hatchments, a tortoise stove and box pews. Under the tower arch is a screen which has been made from the former canopy of the pulpit. Part of the former rood screen now forms part of a pew.

The north chapel contains a monument to Sir Edward Baesh who died in 1587. It contains the effigies of Sir Edward and his wife, both of whom are kneeling, and carvings of their children, also kneeling. Over the monument is a canopy with a round arch supported on classical columns, with a cornice with his arms. In the north window of the chapel are fragments of stained glass, with parts of Sir Edward's arms, his motto, and other lettering. On the north and east walls are the remains of painted inscriptions. A stained glass window by the artist Thomas Denny was installed in the chapel in 2013, the design based upon passages from Psalms 37 and 84

There are brasses in the chancel and nave from the 15th and 16th centuries. Also in the church are wall monuments from the 19th century. The single-manual organ was built in 1871 by Bevington and Sons. There is a ring of three bells. The oldest two are dated 1605 and 1617, and were cast by Robert Oldfield. The other, by John Briant, dates from 1790.

== External features ==
In the churchyard are six monuments and a tomb, all of which are listed at Grade II. The tomb has three monuments on its top, one in red granite, the other two in white marble. It was possibly originally designed by Alfred Waterhouse in 1881 for members of the Buxton family of Easneye. The Rowley Monument, dated 1746 is a limestone tombchest to the memory of James Rowley. Another stone monument dates from the 19th century and is surrounded by traceried cast iron railings. The Hankin Monuments are two limestone tombchests; one dates from the 18th century and the other is dated 1809. The Clarke Monument is also a limestone tombchest; it is to the memory of Joseph Clarke and is dated 1725. Another monument consists of weathered oak timbers dating from the 18th century, with an illegible inscription. The Allen Monument is another limestone tombchest; it is to the memory of William Allen and is dated 1827.

== See also ==
- List of churches preserved by the Churches Conservation Trust in the East of England
