= Church of St Mary the Virgin, Walkern =

Grade I listed church in Hertfordshire, England

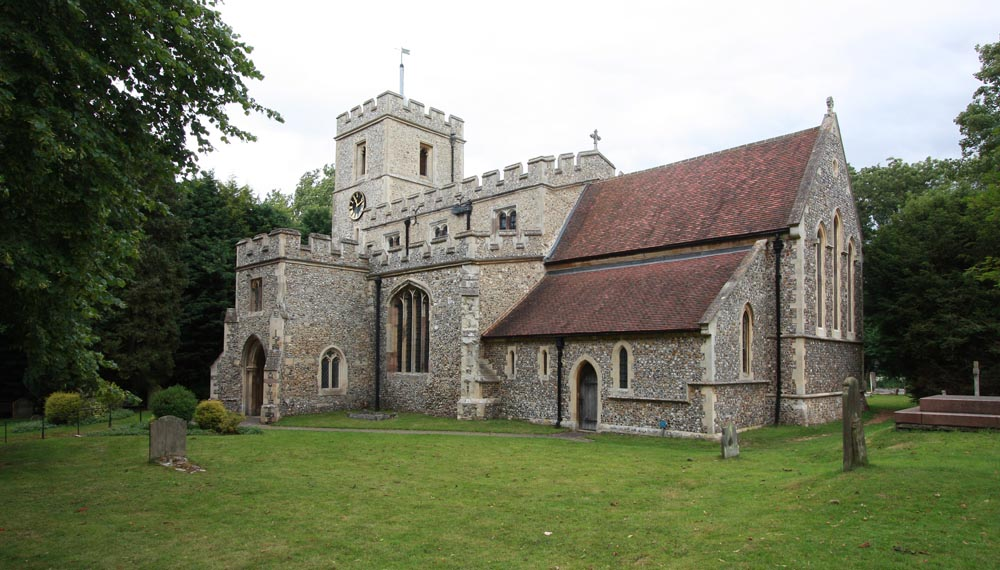
- Church of St Mary the Virgin, Walkern
- 51°55′22″N 0°07′17″W
- OS grid reference: TL 29286 26565
- Location: Walkern, Hertfordshire
- Country: England

Administration
- Province: Canterbury
- Diocese: St Albans

The parish church of St Mary the Virgin in Walkern, Hertfordshire, dates from before the Norman Conquest and has been altered in the succeeding centuries. The nave retains at least one Anglo-Saxon wall.

== Interior ==
There is an Anglo-Saxon sculpture in the south aisle over what was the original doorway to the church.

There is a Purbeck marble effigy of a knight with crossed legs. The cross-legged attitude in tomb sculpture was fashionable in the British Isles in the 13th century. It has been suggested that the sculpture represents William de Lanvalei, lord of Walkern in the early 13th century, and one of the men designated as enforcers of Magna Carta.

== Administration ==
The parish is part of a united benefice with Ardeley, Benington, Cottered, and Throcking.

== Conservation ==
The building was listed Grade I in 1966. It is within a conservation area on the edge of the village near the River Beane.
