= Church of St Mary, Gilston =

Church of St Mary
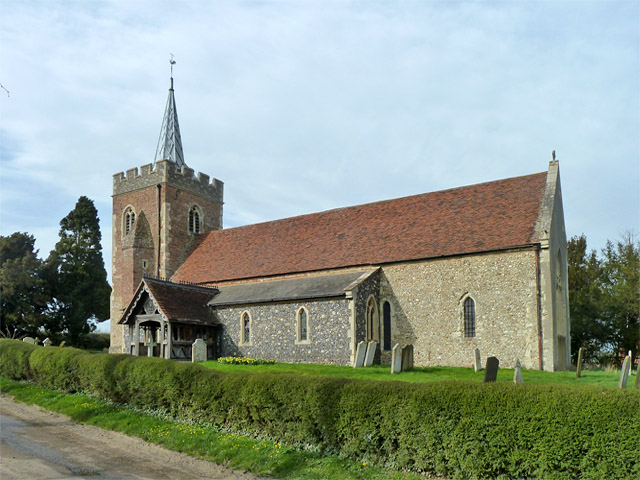

- Location within Hertfordshire
- 51.8019°N 0.0868°E
- OS grid reference: TL 43981 13526
- Location: Gilston, Hertfordshire
- Country: England
- Denomination: Anglican

History
- Status: Parish church

Architecture
- Functional status: Active
- Heritage designation: Grade I listed
- Designated: 24 January 1967
- Architect(s): Philip Hardwick, Victorian restoration
- Years built: Late 13th century, restored 1852

Administration
- Parish: Gilston with Eastwick

St Mary's Church is an Anglican parish church in Gilston, Hertfordshire, England. It dates from the 13th century. The church was restored by Philip Hardwick in 1852. It is a Grade I listed building. In the churchyard is the Johnston Monument designed by Eric Gill in 1923. This has its own Grade I historic designation.

== History and description ==
The current church dates from the late 13th century, although it is probably a reconstruction of an earlier church. In 1852, a local landowner, John Hodgson, commissioned Philip Hardwick to undertake a reconstruction. As the village served by the church had been largely abandoned, the rebuilding was modest and much early material and work remains.

St Mary's remains an active parish church with occasional, monthly, services. The church is a Grade I listed building.

=== Johnston Monument ===
In the south-west corner of the churchyard are three memorial stones to members of the Johnston family. The central cross commemorates Lieutenant Geoffrey Stewart Johnston who was killed on 14 May 1915 at the Second Battle of Ypres and whose name is recorded at the Menin Gate. Memorial stones to either side commemorate Johnston's parents, Rose Alice, who died in 1907, and Reginald Eden who died in 1922. (Note: Reginald Eden Johnston served as Deputy Governor of the Bank of England from 1907 to 1909. The bank's archive holds correspondence between him and the bank's doctor regarding the early retirement on grounds of ill health of Kenneth Grahame. Grahame's premature departure from the bank saw him go on to write The Wind in the Willows.) The memorial was designed in 1923 by Eric Gill whose connection with the Johnston family may have come through Edward Johnston, director of the calligraphy course at the Central School of Art and Design in London, where Gill studied from 1901. (Note: Edward Johnston is best remembered for his designs of the lettering, the Johnston typeface, used on the London Underground.) The Johnston Monument has its own Grade I listing. The monument is currently in a poor state of repair, with the central cross having lost its top section although it remains in the churchyard. As at 2023, the monument is listed on the Heritage at Risk Register.
