= Gilston =

Village in Hertfordshire, England

Coordinates: 51.7896014°N 0.099346°E

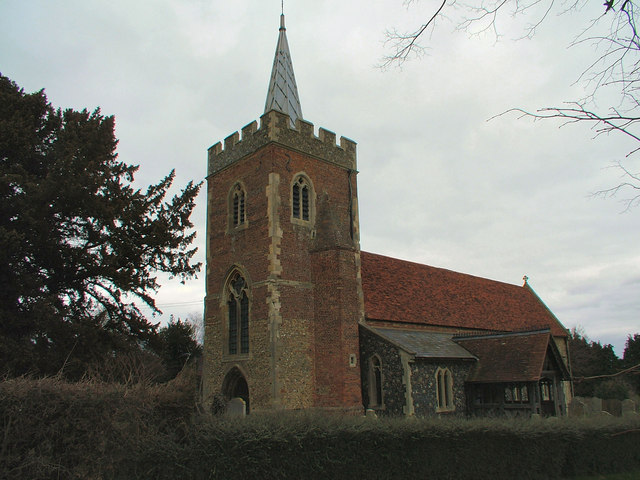
- St Mary's church, Gilston

- Location within Hertfordshire
- Population: 777 (Parish, 2021)
- OS grid reference: TL 448 121
- Civil parish: Gilston
- District: East Hertfordshire
- Shire county: Hertfordshire
- Region: East
- Country: England
- Sovereign state: United Kingdom
- Post town: HARLOW
- Postcode district: CM20
- Dialling code: 01279
- Police: Hertfordshire
- Fire: Hertfordshire
- Ambulance: East of England
- UK Parliament: Hertford and Stortford

Gilston is a village and civil parish in the East Hertfordshire district of Hertfordshire, England. It lies 1 mile (1.6 km) north of the centre of Harlow, its post town, which lies over the county boundary in Essex. The River Stort forms the southern boundary of the parish and is also the county boundary. At the 2021 census the parish had a population of 777.

It shares a grouped parish council with the neighbouring parish of Eastwick.

== History ==
The name derives from Gedel or Gydel, an Old English personal name, and tun, meaning farm or settlement. A variation in spelling may be seen as "Gedeleston", in a legal record in 1424.

The Parish Church of St Mary dates from the 13th century, and is Grade I listed. The churchyard includes a listed memorial to the Johnston family, and there is a 17th-century tomb of the Gore family of Netherhall and an 18th-century tomb of the Turvin family of Terlings Park in the church chancel. The Gore family included a Lord Mayor of London and the Gore and Turvin families both included a High Sheriff of Hertfordshire.

The Plume of Feathers Inn dates from the 18th century.

Gilston Park is a 19th-century country house, which is Grade II* listed. It was designed by Philip Charles Hardwick in 1852 and extended by Arthur Blomfield in 1887, with later work by Blomfield's son, A C Blomfield. It was later home to the Salvin Bowlby family, who founded the Gilston and Eastwick Working Men's Club, now the village hall, in 1908.

In 2017, the government designated the "Harlow and Gilston Garden Town" as an initiative to provide new housing in the area around Harlow, including on land north of the River Stort around Gilston. Planning permission for 10,000 homes and supporting infrastructure in the Gilston area was granted in 2025.

== See also ==
- The Hundred Parishes
