= Howards End =

1910 novel by E. M. Forster

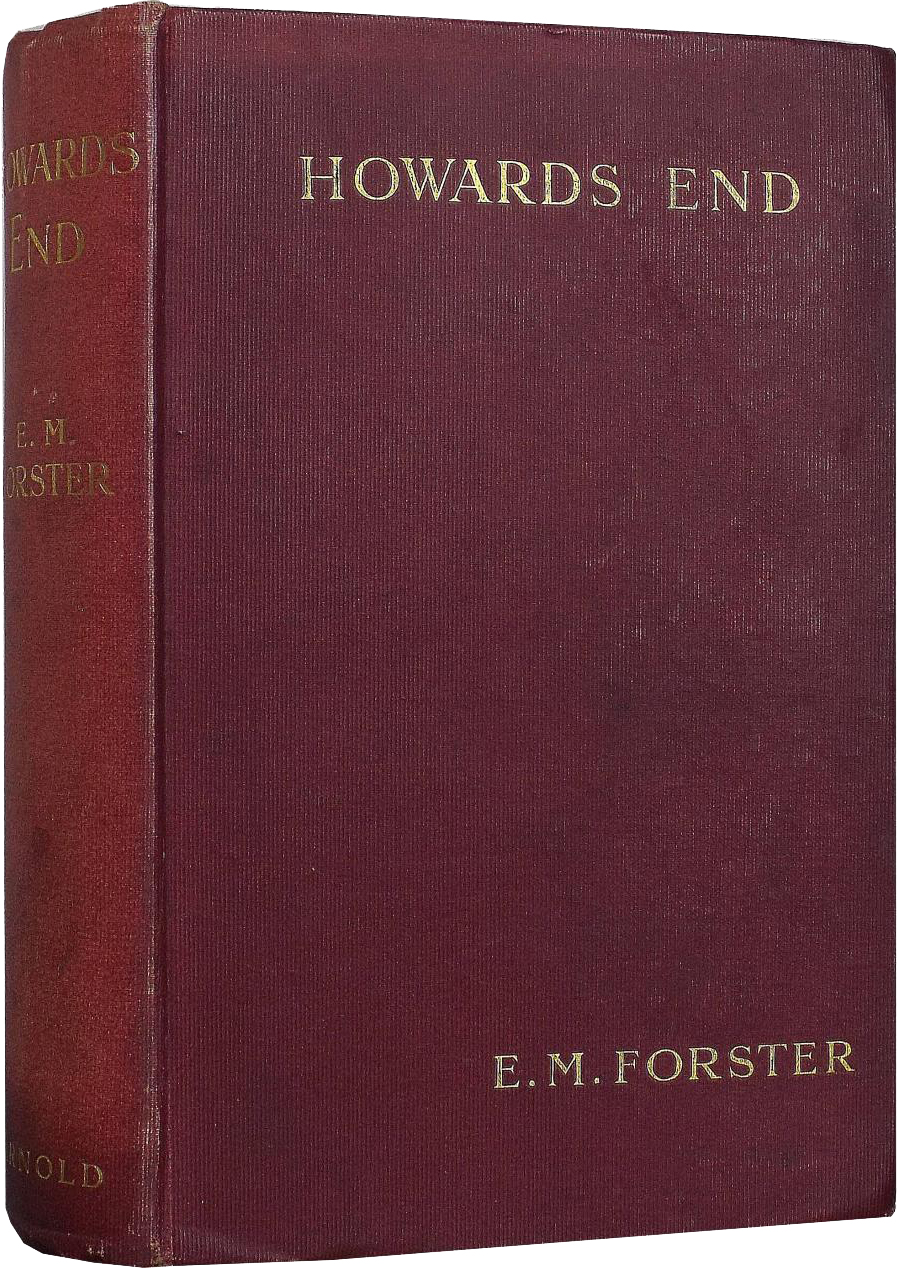
- Cover of first UK edition
- Author: E. M. Forster
- Language: English
- Genre: Novel
- Publisher: Edward Arnold (London)
- Publication date: 18 October 1910
- Publication place: United Kingdom
- Media type: Hardback
- Pages: 343
- Text: Howards End at Wikisource

Howards End is a novel by E. M. Forster, first published in 1910, about social conventions, codes of conduct and relationships in turn-of-the-century England. Howards End is considered by many to be Forster's masterpiece. The book was conceived in June 1908 and worked on throughout the following year; it was completed in July 1910.

== Premise ==
The story revolves around three families in England at the beginning of the 20th century: the Wilcoxes, rich capitalists with a fortune made in the colonies; the half-German Schlegel siblings (Margaret, Helen, and Tibby), whose cultural pursuits have much in common with the Bloomsbury Group; and the Basts, an impoverished young couple from a lower-class background. The idealistic, intelligent Schlegel sisters seek to help the struggling Basts and to rid the Wilcoxes of some of their deep-seated social and economic prejudices.

== Plot summary ==
The Schlegels, an intellectual and idealistic family, once befriended the Wilcoxes, a wealthy and conventional family, in Germany. While visiting the Wilcoxes' country house, Howards End, Helen Schlegel becomes engaged to Paul Wilcox, the second eldest son of the family. The pair soon regret their hasty decision and break off the engagement.

Months later, the Wilcoxes move to London, renting a house near the Schlegels'. Helen's sister Margaret befriends Ruth Wilcox, the matriarch of the family, who feels a deep connection to Howards End. Around Christmastime, Margaret explains that her family will have to leave their childhood home of Wickham Place as the lease will shortly expire. After complications following a surgery, Ruth writes a note leaving Howards End to Margaret and dies soon after. Her widowed husband Henry and his children discover the note and soon dismiss the notion of undue influence on Margaret's part, but decide to burn the note on the basis that the Schlegels already have a suitable home in Wickham Place.

Helen mistakenly steals the umbrella of an aspirational clerk, Leonard Bast; after retrieving it, Margaret offers him her card. Leonard develops a friendship with the Schlegels despite his living with a former prostitute, Jacky. Margaret and Helen debate how best they can improve Leonard's situation, and following a warning from Henry advise him to resign from his job at an insurance company due to its anticipated collapse. Margaret asks Henry for assistance in finding a new home following the expiration of the lease at Wickham Place, alerting him to the reason for Ruth's deathbed note. He proposes to Margaret, who accepts, but his children are opposed to the match, fearing that Margaret wishes to take Howards End for herself.

Helen arrives at the wedding of Henry's daughter Evie with Leonard and Jacky, who are now married and in dire financial straits owing to Henry's advice. Henry recognises Jacky as his former mistress and accuses the Schlegels and Basts of plotting against him. Although disturbed by the revelation, Margaret forgives Henry and does not break off the engagement. Helen argues with Margaret over Henry's mistreatment of both Leonard and Jacky and spends the night with Leonard discussing their plight. Helen later decides to leave the country after sending money to the Basts through her brother Tibby, but Leonard returns the first cheque and refuses further assistance.

After her wedding to Henry, Margaret becomes concerned about Helen's restless travels. When their Aunt Juley falls ill, Margaret asks Helen to return to England, but Helen refuses to see the family. Margaret and Henry visit Howards End, hoping to surprise Helen, but discover her secret pregnancy. Margaret stands by her sister and urges Henry to forgive Helen as she has forgiven him, but he remains unconvinced. Leonard arrives at Howards End the next day, tormented by his affair with Helen and unaware of her presence there. Charles Wilcox attacks Leonard, who stumbles backward into a bookcase. It collapses and falls on him, covering him with books. Leonard, who had undiagnosed heart condition, experiences heart failure and dies. Margaret decides to leave Henry, but he reveals that Charles will be charged with manslaughter by the local authorities. Charles is found guilty and sentenced to prison.

Henry, overwhelmed by shame, agrees to honour Ruth's wish and leave Howards End to Margaret. He also stipulates that, after Margaret's death, the property will pass to the son of Helen and Leonard. Helen returns to Howards End, and the family warmly welcomes her and her son.

== Reception ==
In 1998, the Modern Library ranked Howards End 38th on its list of the 100 best English-language novels of the 20th century.

A Manchester Guardian review written in the year of the novel's publication praised it as "a novel of high quality written with what appears to be a feminine brilliance of perception."

Critics have described Howards End as a "Condition-of-England novel" for its depiction of the poverty and precarity of the Bast family as well as the rapid changes in the social and economic structure of England in the Edwardian period. The Wilcox family represent "new money" as well as global capitalism with their ownership of the Imperial and West African Rubber Company, while the German Schlegel sisters represent the educated, cosmopolitan "New Woman" and raise questions of women's suffrage. The Wilcoxes were possibly inspired by the harsh landlords of Forster's childhood home, while the Schlegels were loosely based on Virginia Woolf and her sister Vanessa Bell, who were Forster's contemporaries in the liberal and humanist-minded Bloomsbury Group.

The eponymous house, Howards End, "is a mystical symbol of the beauty and gentility of that fast-disappearing world. The question of who will own it – for which read England's social future – dominates the book." Located in the countryside, away from London, it has immense sentimental value for Mrs Ruth Wilcox, who threatens the male line of inheritance when she attempts to leave the house to her new friend Margaret Schlegel upon her death. The core message of the novel is its epigraph, "Only connect", a similar theme to that of Forster's novel Maurice, which also features cross-class relationships. In the end, the three families are forced into a form of uneasy reconciliation; critic Barbara Morden argues:

"Ultimately, it is Leonard Bast, the uprooted and dispossessed peasant, who proves to be the key to the novel's pattern of connection and theme of inheritance. It is his and Helen's illegitimate baby, a child of nature rather than a "Son of Empire", born at the heart of the old house into a newly constituted family, who will inherit Howards End, perhaps England.

Several critics have also assessed the influence of Forster's closeted homosexuality on the novel. Critic Vivian Gornick argued that Forster's lack of romantic or sexual experience at the time of writing "haunts" the book: "Unable to achieve emotional experience himself, yet impelled to write about it, he here adopts the intellectually intelligent voice of a writer who senses the import of what lies behind the tragedy of life but doesn't really know what he's talking about."

== Rooks Nest House ==
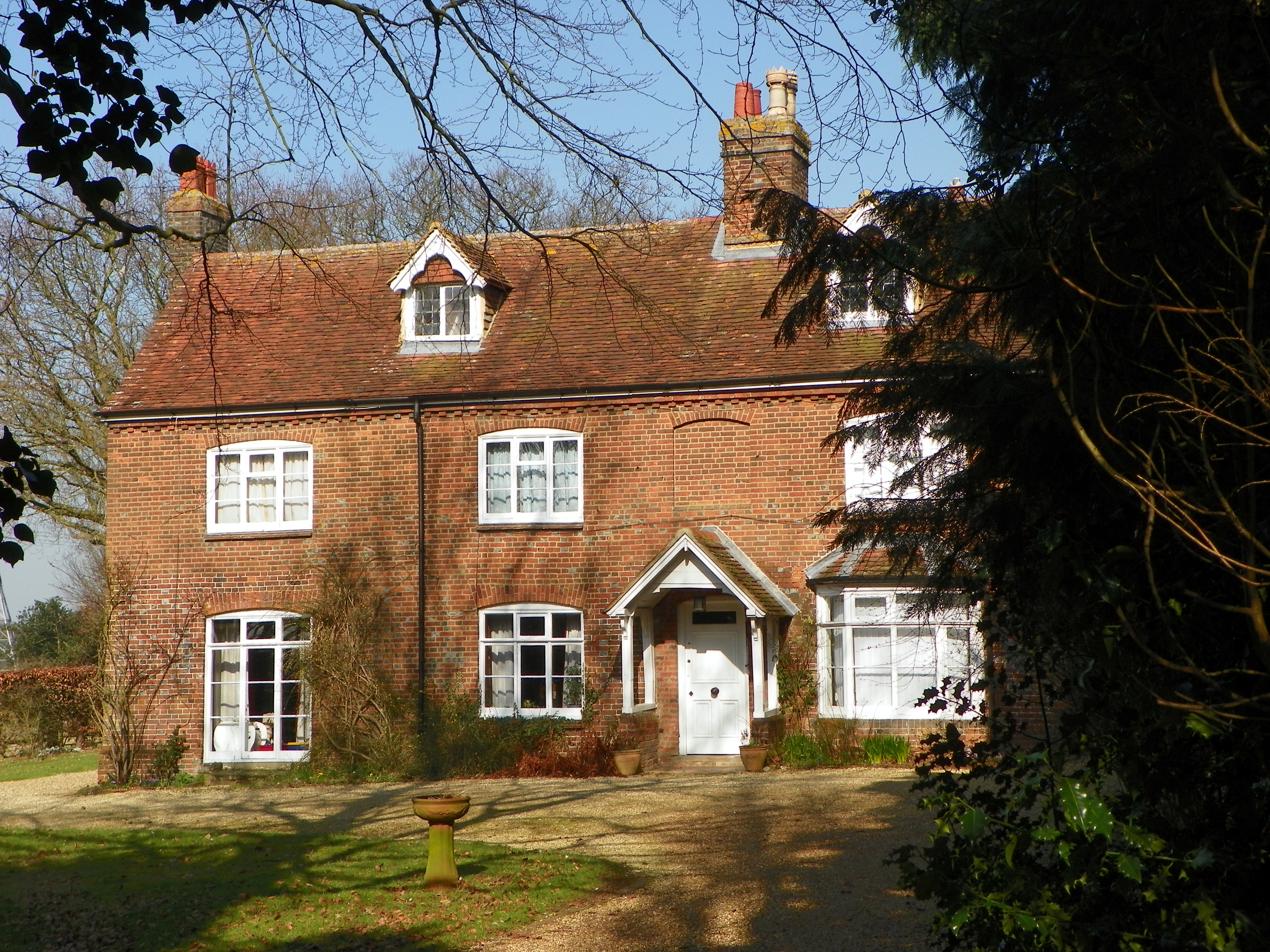
Rooks Nest House, Stevenage

Forster based his description of Howards End on a house in the hamlet of Rooks Nest in Hertfordshire, his childhood home from 1883 to 1893. The house, known in Forster's childhood as "Rooksnest" had, as in the novel, been owned by a family named Howard, and the house itself had been called "Howards" in their day. According to his description in an appendix to the novel, Rooks Nest was a hamlet with a farm on the Weston Road just outside Stevenage. The house is marked on modern Ordnance Survey maps at grid reference TL244267.

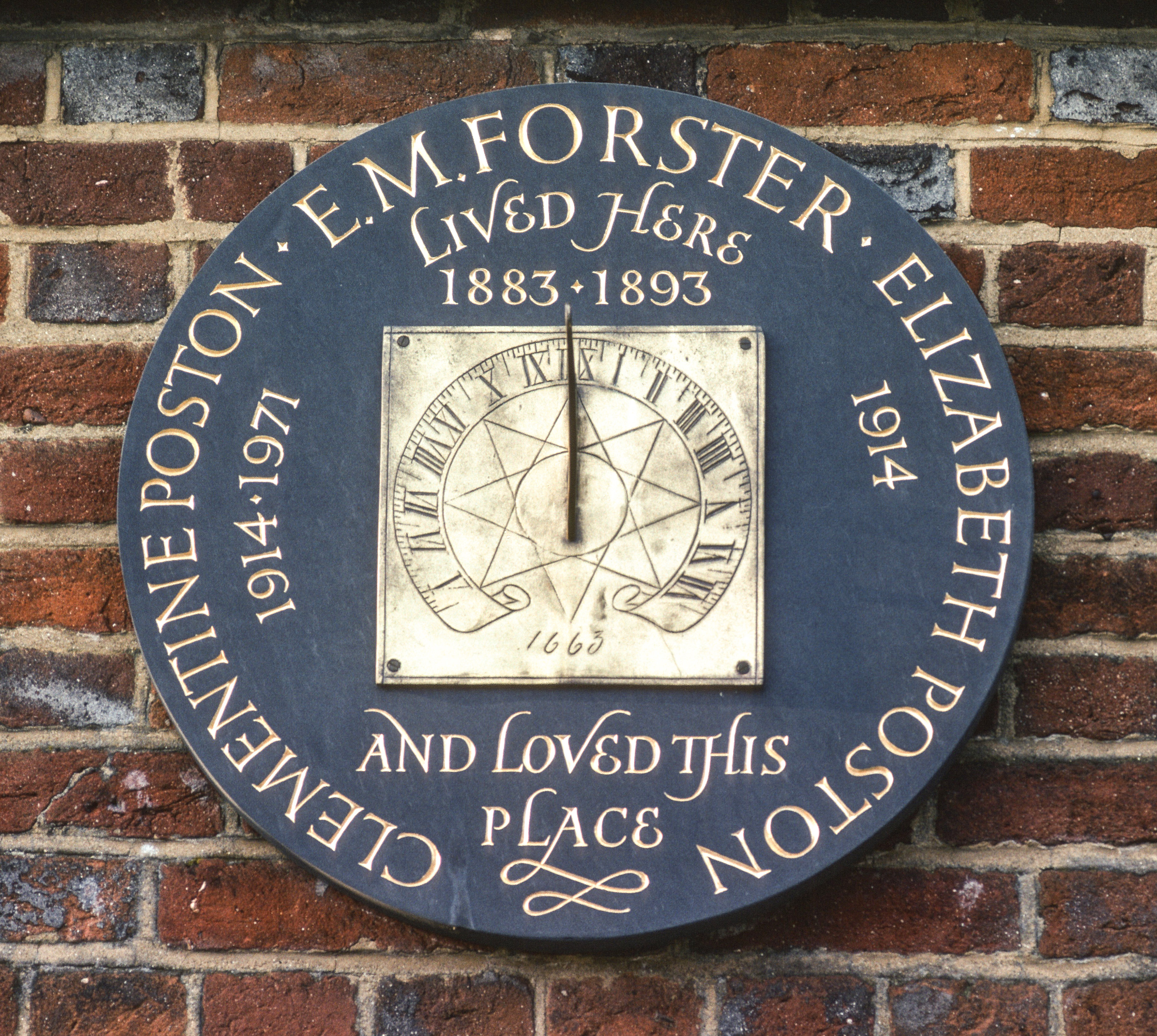
Plaque at Rooks Nest, the former home which was the inspiration for Howards End in E M Forster's novel.

The area to the north-west and west of Rooks Nest House is the only farmland remaining in Stevenage (the area to the east of the house now comprises the St Nicholas neighbourhood of the town). The landscape was termed "Forster country" in a letter to The Times signed by a number of literary figures, published on 29 December 1960. The letter was written in response to two compulsory purchase orders made by the Stevenage Development Corporation; it expressed the hope that 200 acres of the countryside around the house could be preserved both as one of the last beauty spots within 30 miles of London and "because it is the Forster country of Howards End." In 1979, the centenary of the author's birth, the area was officially named the Forster Country by local planners after efforts by a campaign group, the Friends of the Forster Country, which aimed to preserve for future generations the landscape that Forster knew. In 1997, a sculpture marking Forster's connection with the area was unveiled beside St Nicholas churchyard by the MP for Stevenage, Barbara Follett. In September 2017 Rooks Nest house was put up for sale.

In the novel, Wickham Place, the London home of the Schlegel sisters, was demolished to make way for a block of flats; it did not have a direct real-world counterpart. Forster's conception of it owed a great deal to number 1 All Souls Place, where the sisters of Goldsworthy Lowes Dickinson lived.

== Adaptations ==
=== Literature ===
On Beauty, a 2005 novel by Zadie Smith, is loosely based on Howards End and was written as a homage to Forster.

=== Theatre ===
A stage adaptation by Lance Sieveking and Cottrell, was performed in 1967 on tour and at the New Theatre in London, with Gwen Watford, Gemma Jones, Michael Goodliffe, Joyce Carey and Andrew Ray in the cast. Forster co-operated in the production.

The Inheritance is a play in two parts by Matthew Lopez, which derives inspiration from the Forster novel to portray instead the generation that came after the height of the AIDS crisis, addressing the life of a young gay man in New York. The play opened on 2 March 2018, at Young Vic and later transferred to the West End at the Noël Coward Theatre. The production won four Olivier Awards including Best Play. The play opened on Broadway at the Ethel Barrymore Theatre in November 2019 and in March 2020 closed a few days earlier than announced due to the COVID-19 pandemic. The play was awarded the 2021 Tony Award for Best Play. Das Vermächtnis, the German translation by Hannes Becker, premiered at Munich's Residenztheater in January 2022; at Vienna's Theater in der Josefstadt in March 2025.

=== Television ===
A British television adaptation of the novel in the BBC's Play of the Month series was broadcast in 1970, and starred Leo Genn, Sarah-Jane Gwillim, and Glenda Jackson.

In November 2017, a four-part miniseries by Kenneth Lonergan was released on the BBC and Starz.

=== Film ===
A film version made in 1992 stars Emma Thompson, Vanessa Redgrave, Helena Bonham Carter, Anthony Hopkins, and Samuel West. The film was named Best Picture by BAFTA in 1992 and won the 45th Anniversary Prize at the Cannes Film Festival. At the 65th Academy Awards the film won three Academy Awards for films released in 1992: Thompson for Best Actress, Luciana Arrighi for Best Art Direction, and Ruth Prawer Jhabvala for Best Screenplay Based on Material Previously Produced or Published. It was also nominated for the Academy Award for Best Picture.

=== Radio ===
In 1949, an adaptation by Horton Heath aired on NBC University Theatre, with Alma Lawton as Margaret Schlegel, Eileen Erskine as Helen Schlegel, Tom Dillon as Henry Wilcox, Ben Wright as Charles Wilcox, Terry Kilburn as Leonard Bast, and Queenie Leonard as Jacky Bast.

In 2009, a two-part adaptation by Amanda Dalton was released on BBC Radio 4, with John Hurt as the narrator, Lisa Dillon as Margaret Schlegel, Jill Cardo as Helen Schlegel, Tom Ferguson as Tibby Schlegel, Alexandra Mathie as Aunt Juley, Malcolm Raeburn as Henry Wilcox, Ann Rye as Ruth Wilcox, and Joseph Kloska as Charles Wilcox.

=== Opera ===
Allen Shearer's opera Howards End, America (2016), with a libretto by Claudia Stevens, moves the action to 1950s Boston. The adaptation is discussed in Stevens's article "Page to Stage: A New Opera, Howards End, America" in the Polish Journal of English Studies.
