= Graveley, Hertfordshire =

Village in Hertfordshire, England

Coordinates: 51.93563°N 0.21054°W

Graveley
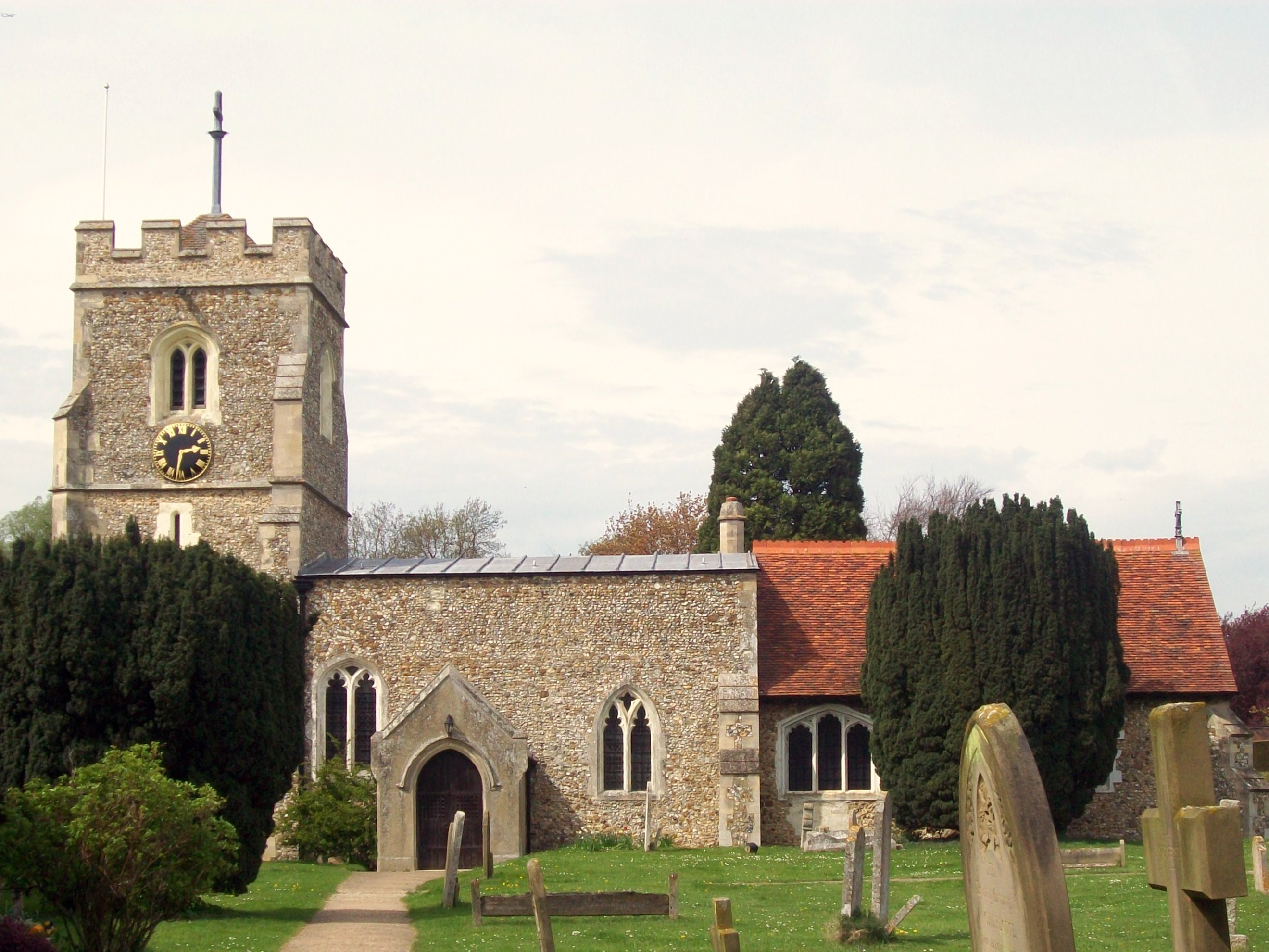
- St Mary's Church, Graveley

- Location within Hertfordshire
- Population: 498 (Parish, 2021)
- OS grid reference: TL232278
- Civil parish: Graveley
- District: North Hertfordshire
- Shire county: Hertfordshire
- Region: East
- Country: England
- Sovereign state: United Kingdom
- Post town: Hitchin
- Postcode district: SG4
- Dialling code: 01438
- Police: Hertfordshire
- Fire: Hertfordshire
- Ambulance: East of England
- UK Parliament: Hitchin

Graveley is a village and civil parish about four miles east of Hitchin and two miles north of Stevenage in Hertfordshire, England. The parish also includes the hamlet of Chesfield. The population of the parish in the 2021 census was 498.

== History ==
Graveley is mentioned in the Domesday Book. It was granted by William the Conqueror to Goisbert of Beauvais.

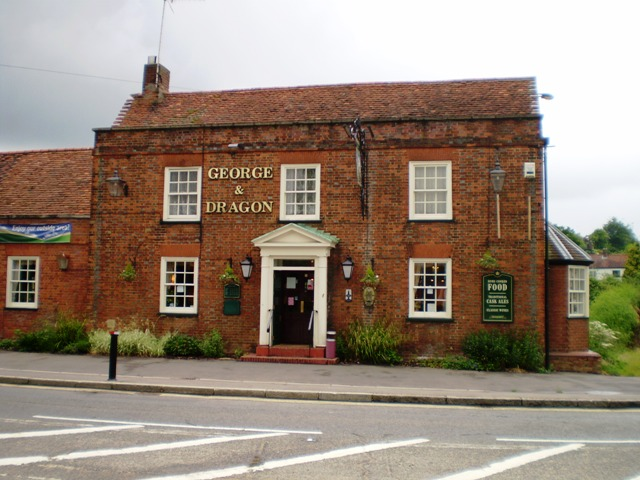
The chequered brick facade of the George and Dragon

The village is built on a Roman road, which developed into a section of the Great North Road. This section of the road was managed by the Stevenage and Biggleswade Turnpike Trust in the 18th century; one of their milestones survives in the village, reporting that it is 33 miles from London.

The village was by-passed by the A1(M) motorway in the 1960s.

== Architecture ==
The medieval church is of flint construction.

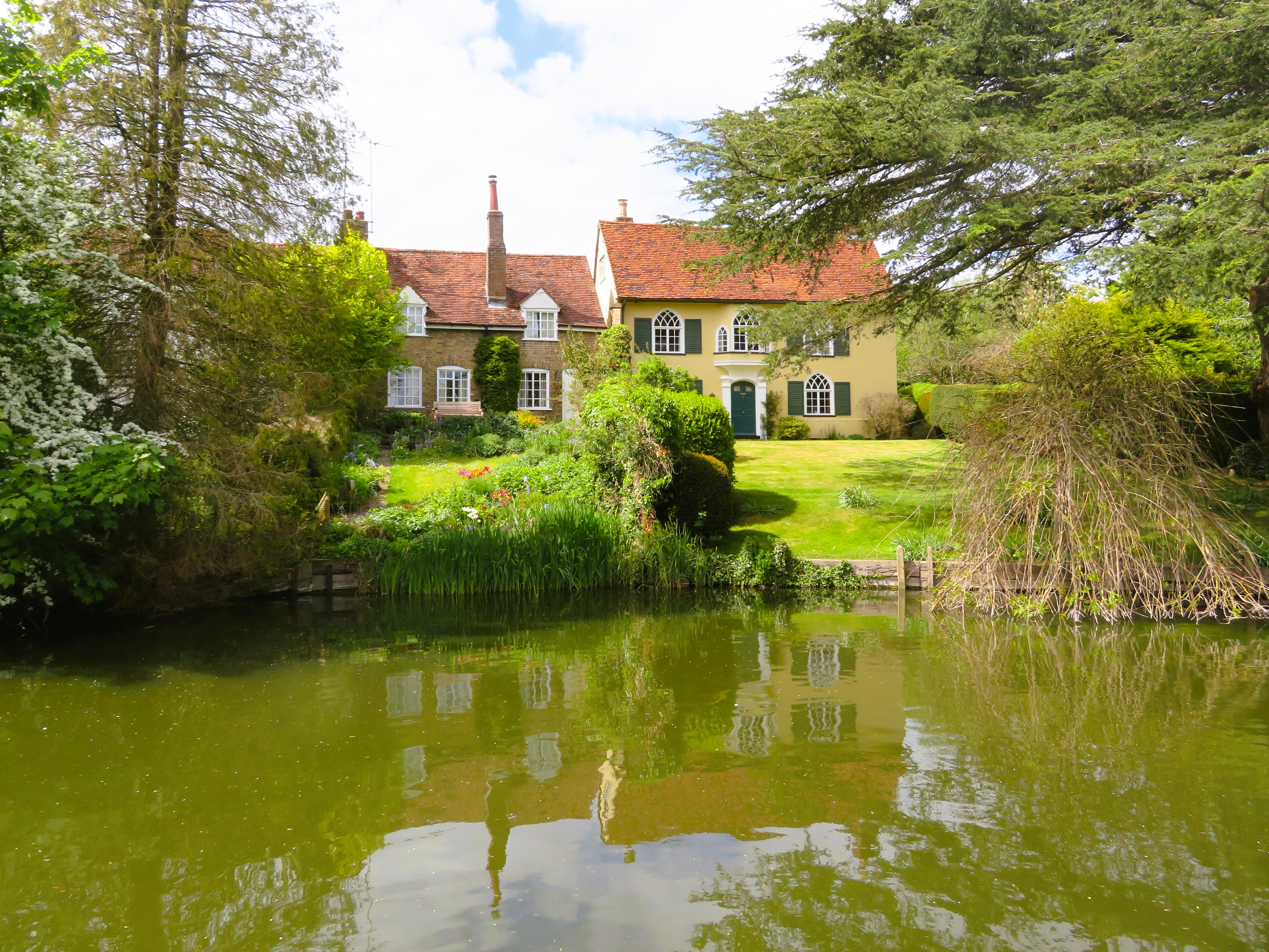
Village pond at Graveley

There are a number of attractive cottages and houses, including The George and Dragon pub, which has an 18th-century facade, and The Wagon & Horses. At one time there were four pubs, but two have now closed down.

== Parish boundaries ==
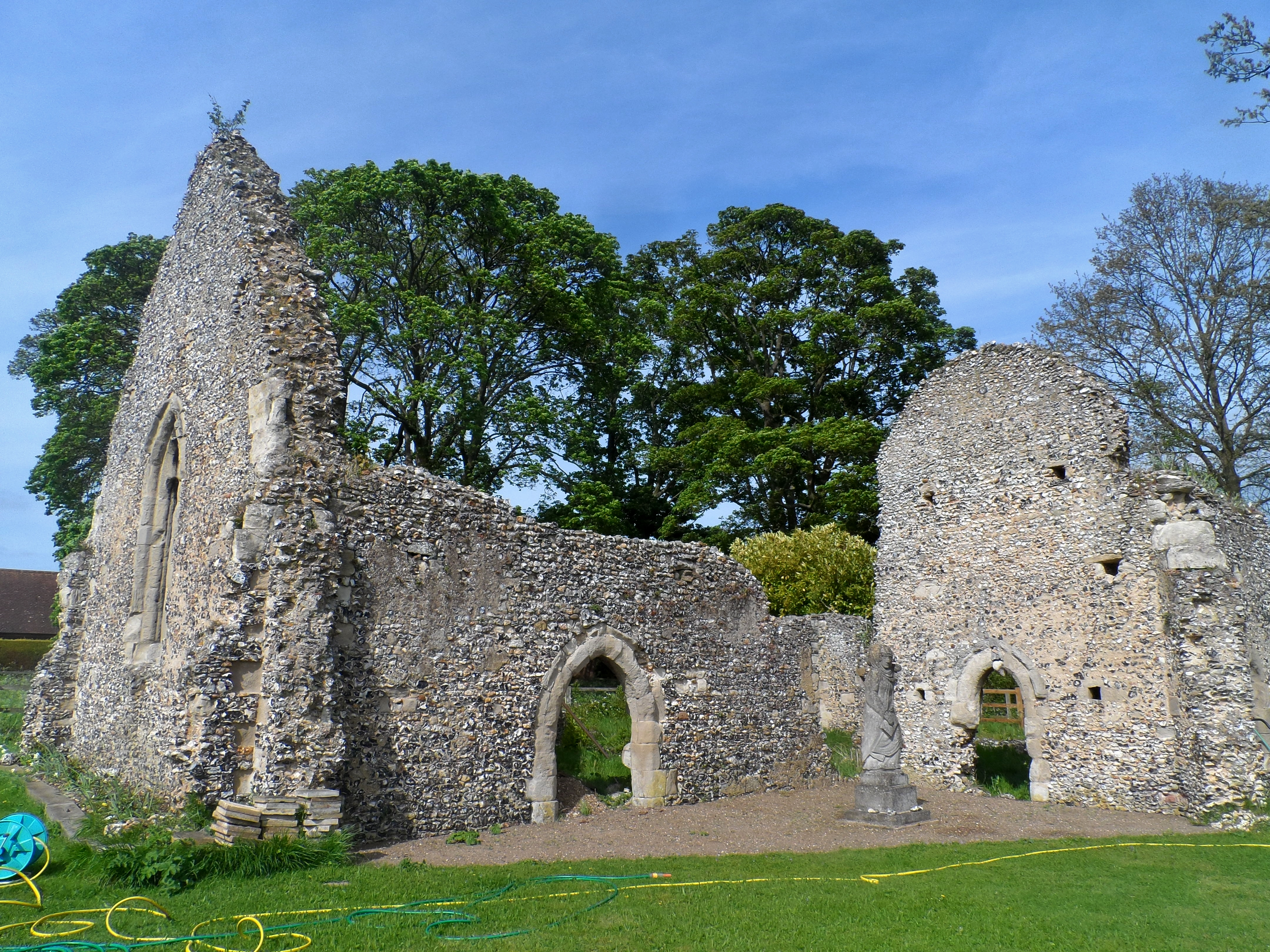
St Ethelreda's Church, Chesfield

The parish absorbed the site of a lost settlement, Chesfield (or Chivesfield), about a mile to the east of Graveley; little remains there apart from the ruined walls of its 14th-century church, a farm and a couple of cottages. Graveley and Chesfield had been separate parishes but were united in 1445.

In 1953, the southern part of Graveley parish, including Corey's Mill and the future site of the Lister Hospital, was transferred to become part of Stevenage Urban District.

In 2011, Graveley parish ceded some of its territory to become the new civil parish of Great Ashby.

== Governance ==
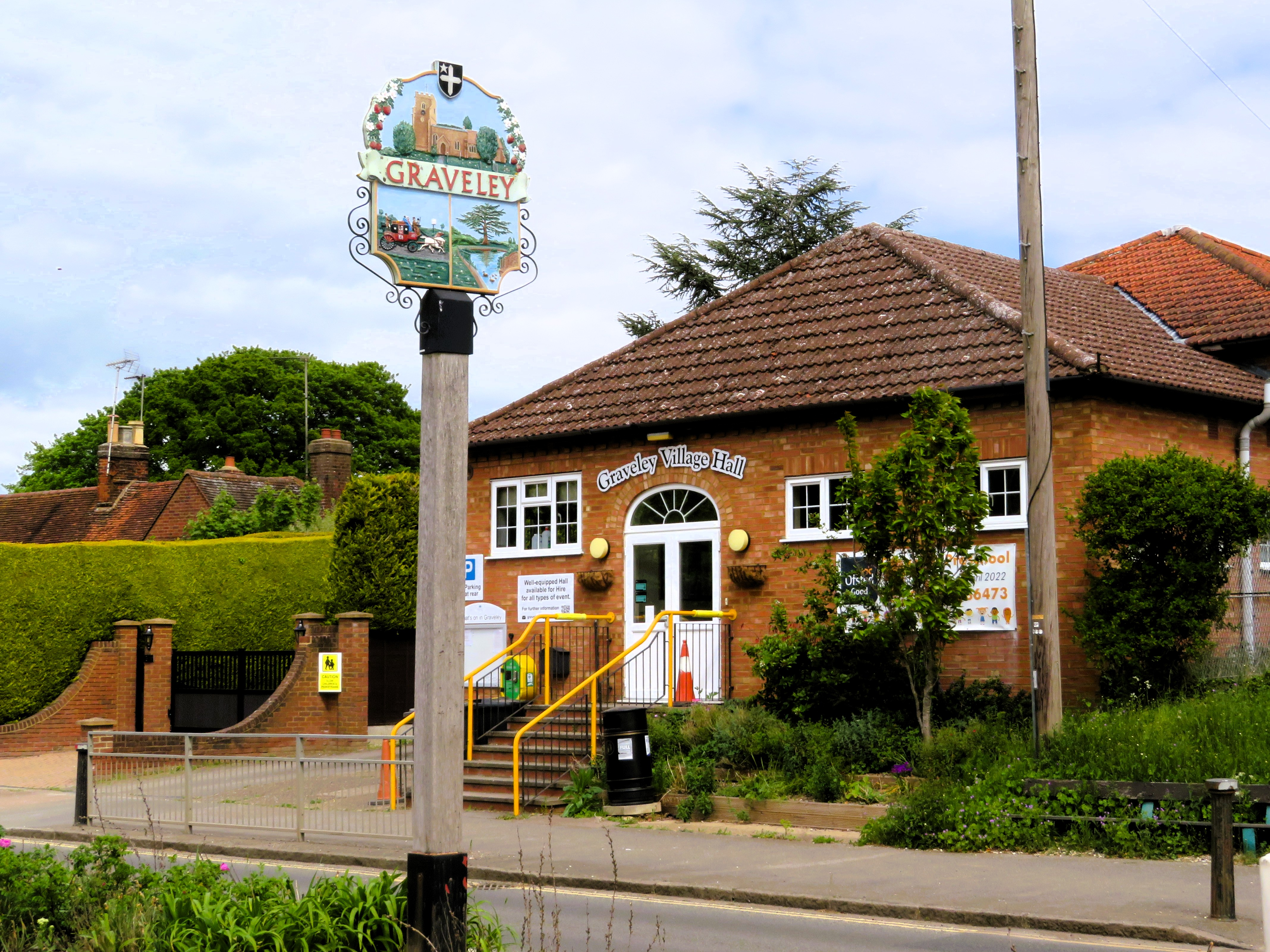
Village Hall, High Street

Graveley has three tiers of local government at parish, district and county level: Graveley Parish Council, North Hertfordshire District Council, and Hertfordshire County Council. The parish council meets at the village hall on High Street.
