= Sele Farm =

Area of Hertford, England

Coordinates: 51°48′10″N 0°06′20″W

Sele Farm is an area on the north-western edge of Hertford, Hertfordshire.

== Geography ==
Sele Farm is mostly 60 metres above sea level, on a hill between the River Mimram and River Beane.

== Area ==
Up to 2028, the area will continue to be surrounded by fields and farmland with a mix of social and private housing. It has a variety of shops located in Fleming Crescent. A doctor's surgery is located nearby in Tudor Way. The Golden Griffin public house is at the intersection of Welwyn Road and Windsor Drive. Opposite the pub is Calton Court, a flexicare housing scheme provided by Sovereign Network Group (formerly Riversmead Housing/Network Homes), which was opened in March 2013 by Mark Prisk MP. The Sele Farm area extends across the road to contain the Sele School and Thieves Lane up to and including Turpins Close, Calton Avenue and Bentley Road.

Towards the end of 2028 development of the Archer's Spring site immediately west of Sele Farm will begin with a target of 342 new homes. Plans for building more homes on Bacon's Farm next to Archer's Spring and Panshanger Park on the south side of Welwyn Road are also taking shape for the 2030s.

Public transport links: the 323 bus service from Welwyn Garden City to Ware, Hertfordshire) now serves Sele Farm in place of the 395 which was cancelled in August 2025. The 379 stops at the end of Windsor Drive and goes to Stevenage via Bramfield, Datchworth and Knebworth. The 724, which stops near the Golden Griffin on Welwyn Road, goes east terminating at Harlow via Ware and west to Heathrow Central bus station via Welwyn Garden City, Hatfield, St Albans, Watford and Rickmansworth. Bus links to other nearby towns are located within walking distance e.g. the 390 to Stevenage. Hertford North railway station (HFN) is nearby at the bottom of Welwyn Road and runs on the Hertford Loop Line southbound to London King's Cross or Moorgate and northbound to Stevenage and the East Coast Main Line.

One primary school, St Andrews CE School, is located within Sele Farm and there are 2 others nearby, Hollybush JMI and St Joseph's Catholic school. A senior school, The Sele School, accommodating Selections Children's Centre is situated on the estate.

Sele Farm contains two children's play parks, one in Bentley Road, and the other at the rear of the area on The Ridgeway estate. The Ridgeway Local Park borders the Sele Farm Community Centre and a multi use games area, opened in 2008. It has been awarded the Green Flag Award continually since 2009. In addition to these parks, the estate has a number of open spaces.

There is a St John Ambulance unit on Hawthorn Close off Tudor Way.

Hertford Cemetery is behind Tudor Way and the entrance is on Bramfield Road.

Nearby Sele Mill on North Road was the first recorded paper mill in the UK and went into production circa 1488.
