= John Tate (papermaker) =

English papermaker

John Tate was the first English papermaker and was active in the second half of the 15th century. According to the Oxford Dictionary of National Biography he was born about 1448. A businessman based in London, he was a member of the Mercers Company.

== Early life ==
The Tates were a successful business family with international trading connections. The subject was known to contemporaries as "John Tate the younger", and is believed have been the son of the John Tate who served as Lord Mayor of London in 1473. Neither father nor son is to be confused with a third John Tate, apparently a cousin of the subject, who was knighted and who served as Lord Mayor in 1496-97 and 1514–15.

== Papermaking ==
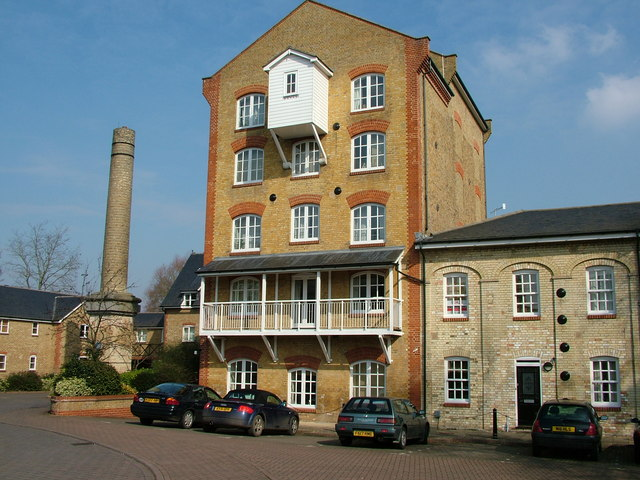
Sele Mill has been rebuilt since Tudor times

Tate acquired a long-established watermill called Sele Mill. At that time it was just outside Hertford, but now it is within the town's suburbs. The mill was powered by the River Beane, a chalk stream, near its confluence with the River Lea. This facility was converted into a paper mill. Paper was produced there in the 1490s, and possibly earlier.

The catchment of the Beane was a rural area, but there is evidence that Tate found customers locally with some of his paper being used for record-keeping by the Woodhall estate a few miles upstream. Importantly for his business plan, the mill was less than 30 miles from the capital which could be accessed via Ermine Street or the River Lea (see note^{1}). One London-based customer was Wynkyn de Worde, who took over Caxton's print shop in the 1490s. Another London-based customer was Henry VII of England. The king, who had given Hertford Castle to his wife in 1487, visited the mill in 1498. He is known to have made a return visit the following year. It has been suggested that one of the watermarks used by Tate, a Tudor rose, was designed with royal use in mind.

The quality of the paper was good, but the mill seems to have ceased producing it at the beginning of the 16th century for reasons which are not clear. Tate mentioned the building in his will of 1507 along with a stock of white paper he had there. Possibly he could not get a good enough price for his paper, although, as far as is known, there were not any other British producers.

== Final years ==
Tate wrote his will in 1507 and died that year or the following. He had been living at Mincing Lane in the City of London and was buried at St Dunstan-in-the-East.

== Legacy ==
Sele Mill was rebuilt at the end of the 19th century. It is now used as apartments.

After Tate's time a paper industry was reestablished in Hertfordshire. The valley of the River Gade proved a suitable site and, in a significant break-through, a continuous paper making machine was installed at Frogmore Mill in 1803.

== Notes ==
1. The first Act of Parliament for navigational improvement of the River Lea was granted in 1425.
