= Stapleford, Hertfordshire =

Village in Hertfordshire, England

Coordinates: 51.836°N 00.09°W

Stapleford
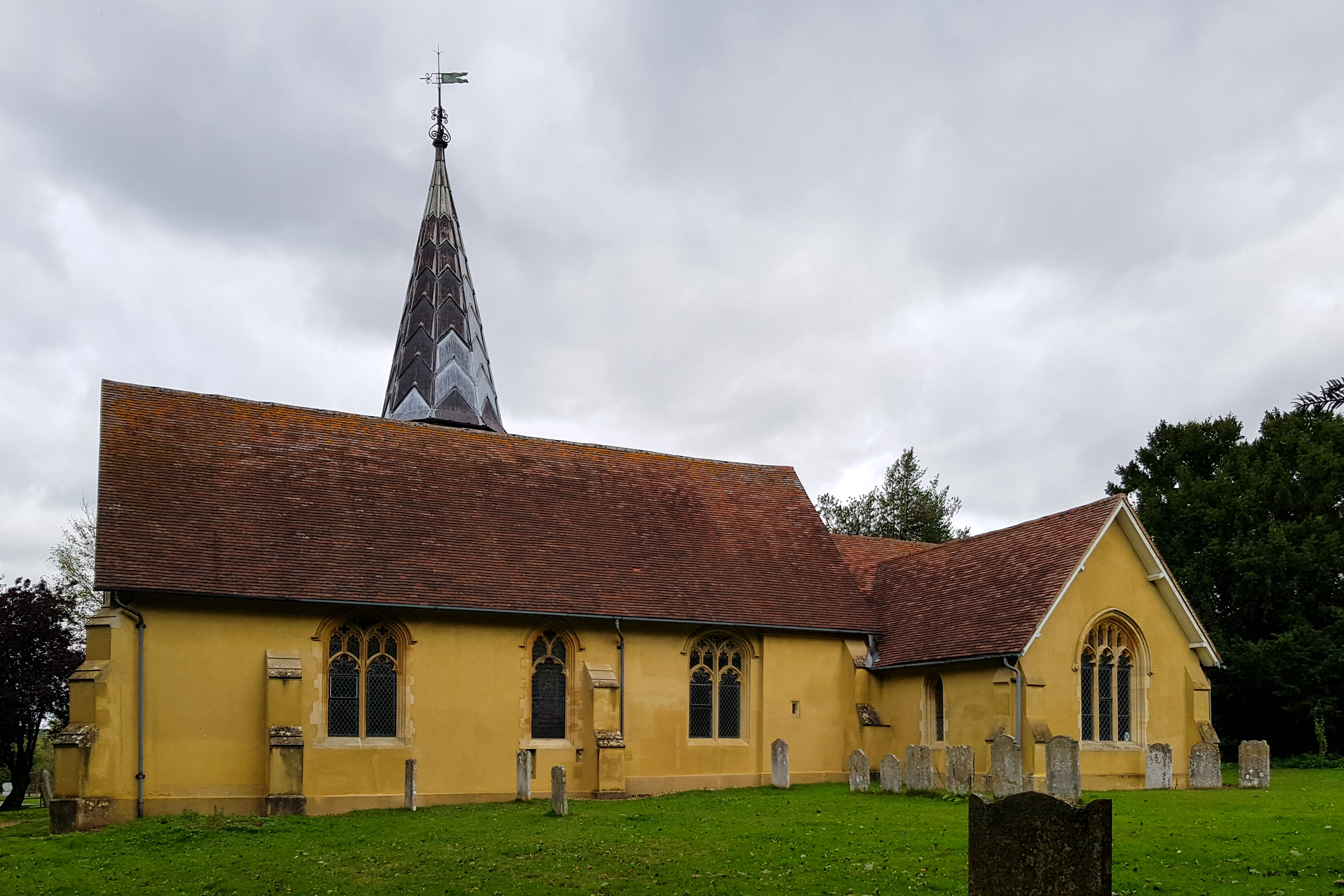
- The church of St Mary, Stapleford

- Location within Hertfordshire
- Population: 575 (Parish, 2021)
- OS grid reference: TL310171
- Civil parish: Stapleford and Waterford
- District: East Hertfordshire
- Shire county: Hertfordshire
- Region: East
- Country: England
- Sovereign state: United Kingdom
- Post town: HERTFORD
- Postcode district: SG14
- Dialling code: 01992
- UK Parliament: North East Hertfordshire

Stapleford is a village in the civil parish of Stapleford and Waterford, in the East Hertfordshire district of Hertfordshire, England. The village lies in the Beane valley, on the A119 road about 3 miles (5 km) north of Hertford, its post town. As well as Stapleford village itself, the parish includes the village of Waterford and surrounding rural areas. At the 2021 census, the parish had a population of 575. On 1 April 2026 the parish was renamed from "Stapleford" to "Stapleford and Waterford".

== History ==
The placename occurs as Stapelford in an Exchequer document of 1210, lending weight to Walter William Skeat's suggestion that the site of a ford crossing the Beane was marked by an upright stake, in Anglo-Saxon stapel.

In the 1887, John Marius Wilson described Stapleford as:

"a parish in the district and county of Hertford; 2¾ miles N of Hertford r. station. It has a post-office under Hertford. Acres, 1,319. Real property, £1,622. Pop., 226. Houses, 45. The property is all in one estate. The living is a rectory in the diocese of Rochester. Value, £280. Patron, A Smith, Esq. The church was repaired and enlarged in 1852. There is a national school.

In 1831, the majority of males were labourers and servants.

Waterford, at the southern end of the parish, historically formed part of the ancient parish of Bengeo. Waterford was transferred into Stapleford parish in 1937.

== Statistics ==
In the 1880s, most men in the parish had occupations in agriculture, whereas women were more often in domestic service; those shown as 'unknown occupation' in the figure are most likely housewives.

Census reports show that from 1880 to 1920 the parish population was around 200. Thereafter, population more than doubled to 500 by 1960, and by 2011 had reached 567.

According to the Office of National Statistics, in 2011 67% of Stapleford's population were Christian and 26% classified themselves as non-religious. Other 2011 statistics show that 299 out of 567 were classified as having very good health. At the 2011 Census, the largest ethnic group was white British with 537 out of 567.

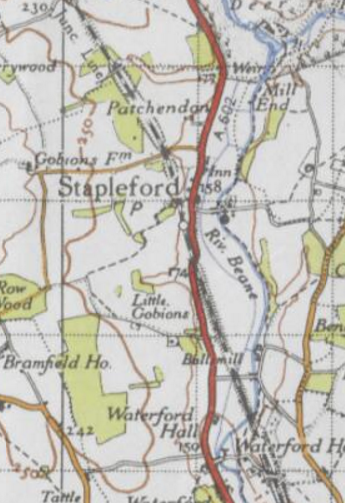
Map of Stapleford, Ordnance Survey of Great Britain New Popular Edition, 160

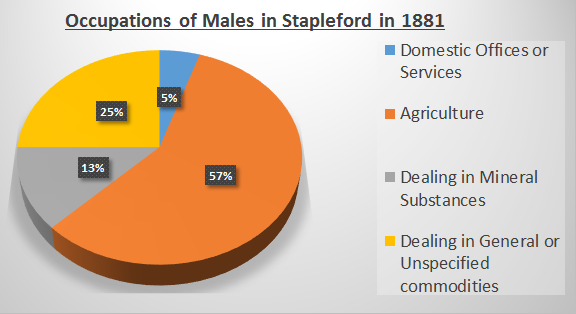
Occupations of males in 1881

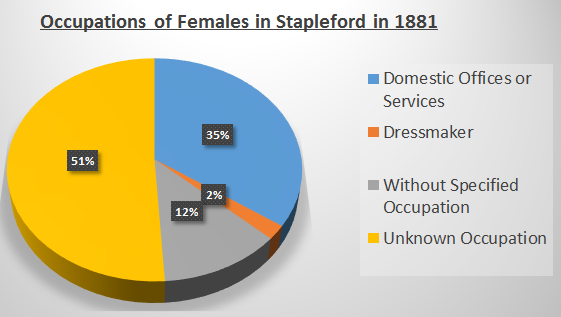
Occupations of females in 1881

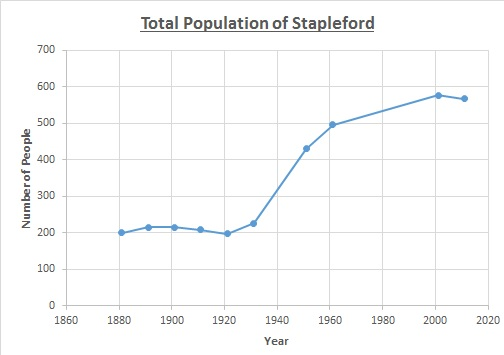
Total population of Stapleford Parish, Hertfordshire, as reported by the Census of Population from 1881 to 2011

== Transport ==
The Hertford loop line runs through the parish, passing close to the west of Stapleford village. Stapleford station was just north of the bridge over the main road, but was only open from 1924 to 1939.

2011 census data shows that only 19 out of 229 households did not have a car or van. Many households had more than one, with 105 households having two cars or vans.

== Economy ==
2011 statistics show that for females of working age, 24% were in part-time work, 28% full-time, 9% in self-employment, while 37% were economically inactive and around 2% were unemployed. For men in the parish, 80% were economically active.

== Parish church ==
The Church of England parish church is dedicated to St Mary. The building was begun in the mid-12th century, altered in later centuries, and restored and enlarged in 1874. It was designated as Grade II* listed in 1966.
