= Aston, Hertfordshire =

Village and civil parish in Hertfordshire, United Kingdom

Coordinates: 51.888°N 0.152°W

Aston
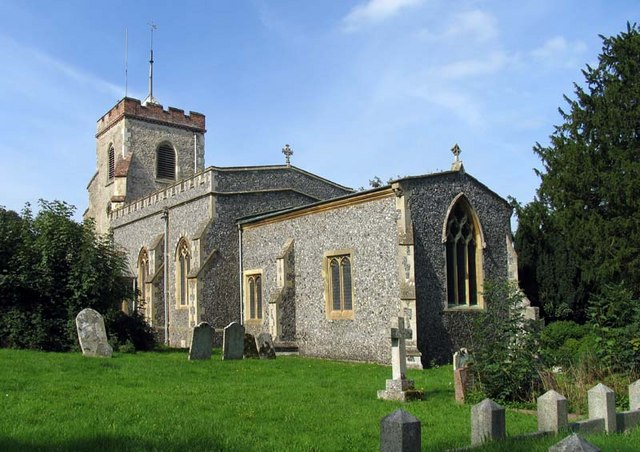
- Parish church of St Mary

- Location within Hertfordshire
- Population: 839 (Parish, 2021)
- District: East Hertfordshire
- Shire county: Hertfordshire
- Region: East
- Country: England
- Sovereign state: United Kingdom
- Post town: STEVENAGE
- Postcode district: SG2
- UK Parliament: Stevenage

Aston is a village and civil parish in the East Hertfordshire district of Hertfordshire, England. It lies 2.5 miles (4.0 km) south-east of the centre of Stevenage, its post town. The village stands on a ridge of high ground between Stevenage to the west and the Beane Valley to the east. As well as the village itself, the parish also includes the hamlets of Aston End and Hooks Cross and surrounding rural areas. At the 2021 census the parish had a population of 839.

== History ==
During the reign of Edward the Confessor (1024–66), the manor of "Estone" was held by three vassals of Stigand, Archbishop of Canterbury. Their names are not known but some land is recorded as that of Wulf the Dane.

By the time the Domesday Book was completed (1086), the small community of Estone, now Aston, was made up of about 25 families and included a priest. A church was probably on the site of the present parish church, which is dedicated to St Mary.

King William I gave 185 manors, including that of Estone, to his half-brother Odo, Bishop of Bayeux. Odo's deceptions, and his ambition to become Pope, so offended the King that he was sentenced to perpetual imprisonment. His treasures and estates, including Estone, reverted to the Crown

The manor, now in Royal possession, was presented by King Henry I in dower to his second wife, 18 year-old Adelicia, upon their marriage in 1121. In that same year Henry founded the Abbey at Reading. After the king died in 1135, the Dowager Queen visited Reading Abbey on the first anniversary of her husband's death and bestowed on the abbot and monks of the monastery the gift of "Easton" Manor.

Easton, so named at this time, remained under monastic control for 300 years until the Dissolution (1536–39), when King Henry VIII proclaimed himself supreme head of the Church. The Abbot of Reading, along with two of his clerks, was publicly murdered for refusing to surrender the Abbey. Distributing the spoils amongst his courtiers, Henry gave the manor of "Aston", for the tenth part of a Knight's fee, and a rent of 17 shillings and 11 pence, to the local favourite Sir Philip Boteler, Sheriff of Hertford.

Sir Philip ruled at Woodhall in the contiguous parish of Watton. To establish himself on his new territory, he chose the site of a ruined building, probably of monastic origin and, using some of the structure and stone from the ruin, he built the manor house which is now known as Aston Bury.

During World War II, Aston House, opposite the church, was occupied by the Special Operations Executive, engaged in the design, testing and production of explosives and secret weapons for use in sabotage operations and guerrilla warfare. Afterwards occupied by the Stevenage Development Corporation it was subsequently demolished in the 1950s.

== Parish church ==
The parish church of St Mary the Virgin is a Grade II* listed building. It was rebuilt about 1230. One detail surviving from that period is the double headed piscina in the south wall of the chancel. The tower was added between 1390 and 1420 and the north aisle and vestry about 1856. The building has undergone many changes to its structure through the passing centuries. A serious fire gutted the tower in 1958 destroying the remaining 15th century stained glass and the ancient bells. The Lych gate was erected to the memory of Rev. George Oddie. His father was also a Rector at Aston. Gregor House and the Dene were their respective rectories.
