= Aston Bury =

Manor house in Aston, Hertfordshire, England

Coordinates: 51.879°N 0.148°W

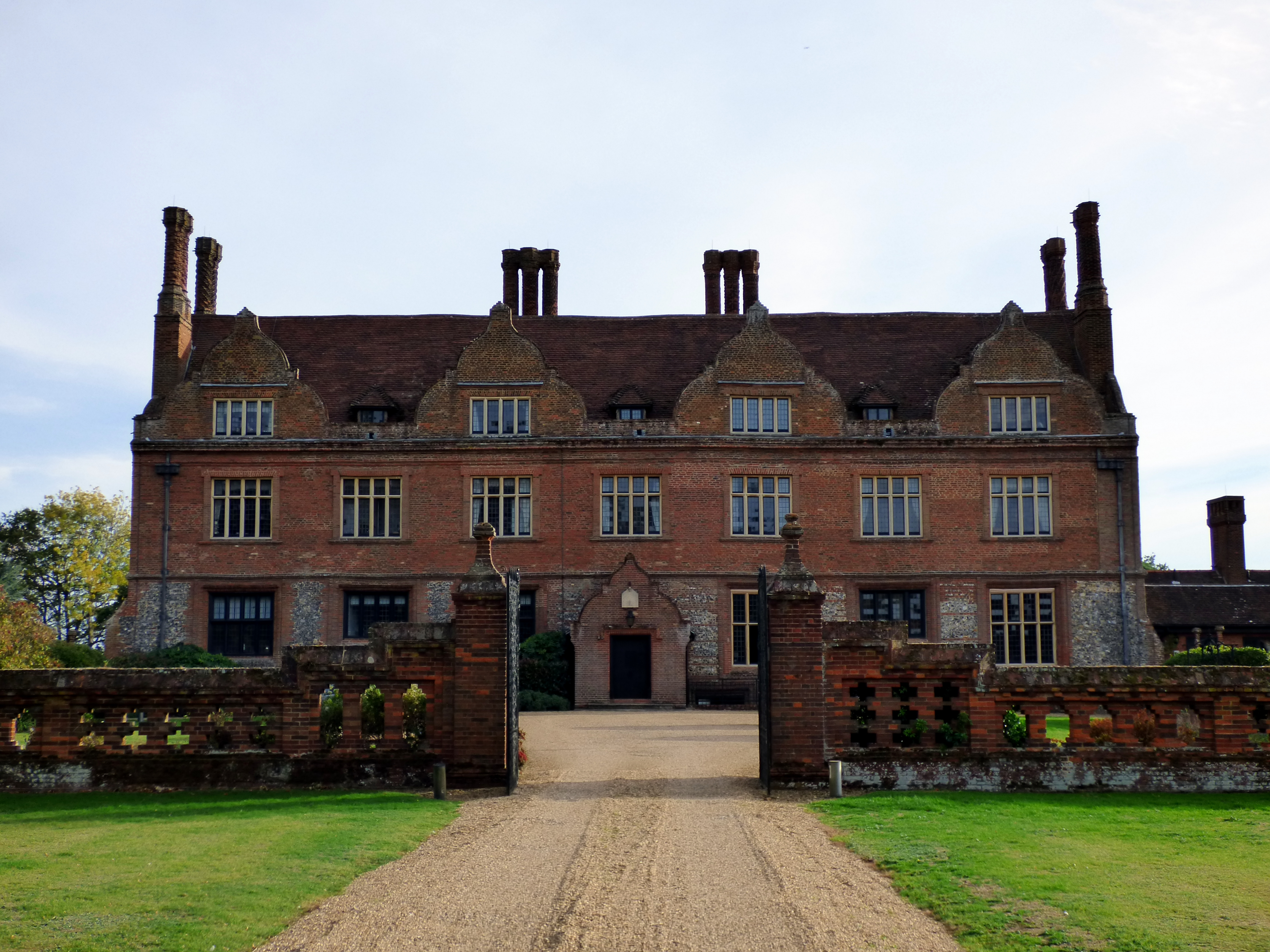
Aston Bury Manor house

Aston Bury is a manor house near Aston, Hertfordshire, England. It is Grade I listed building.

It was built in the mid 17th century, possibly by the Boteler family, restored in 1883 for Captain William Edward Freeman O'Brien and restored again in 1908-09 for Vernon A. Malcolmson. The house is now a luxury apartment block. The building consists of a long rectangular block in two storeys with cellars and attics and two large gabled stair wings at the rear. The ground floor walls are made of flint, banded with brick and with brick dressings. The first floor has timber framing, infilled and faced with brick. The roof is steep and made of red tiles.

== History ==
Aston Bury manor belonged to the monks of St Mary, Reading when it was seized by the Crown at the Dissolution of the Monasteries and leased to Sir Philip Boteler of Watton-at-Stone, (High Sheriff of Hertfordshire in 1533 and 1540). The manor belonged to Sir Henry Cason, of Aston Bury, Birthdate: circa 1600, Death: after April 18, 1649. The manor then descended in the Boteler family until John Palmer Boteler sold it to Sir Thomas Rumbold. It then passed through various hands to Captain William Edward Freeman O'Brien, who sold it in 1907 to Mr. Vernon A. Malcolmson. Malcolmson died in 1948 and his son sold the house to Paul Petrocokino, a leading Member of Moral Re-Armament.

In 1973 Hertfordshire County Council began converting the house to a teacher training centre but after the scheme was abandoned it was converted instead (in 1989) into eleven luxury apartments.
