= Woodhall Park =

Historic house in Hertfordshire, England

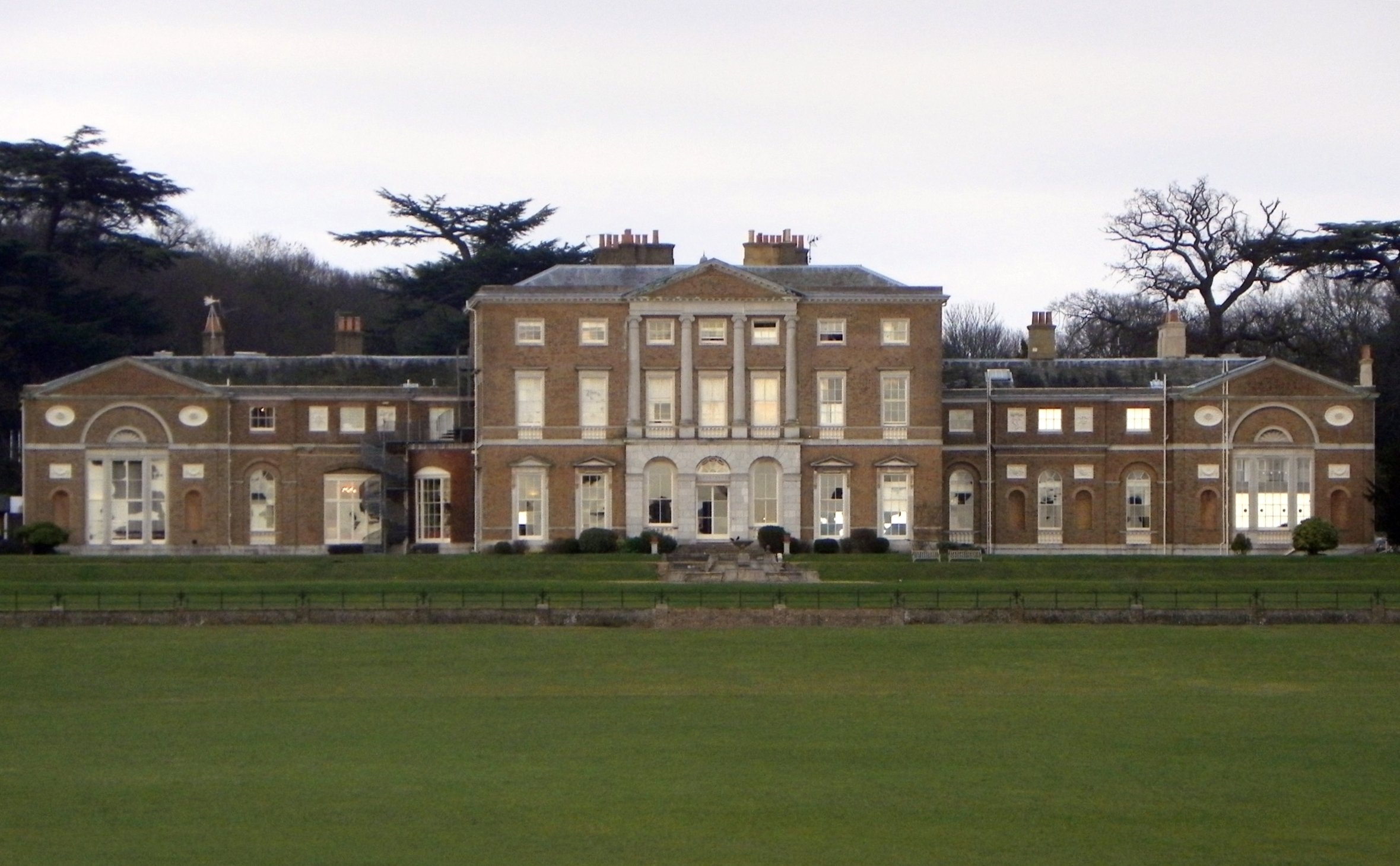
- West front of Heath Mount School
- Interactive map of the Woodhall Park area

General information
- Architectural style: Palladian
- Location: Watton-at-Stone, England

Listed Building – Grade I
- Official name: Woodhall Park (Heath Mount School)
- Designated: 1952
- Reference no.: 1031363
- Coordinates: 51°51′11″N 0°05′23″W
- Construction started: 1770s
- Completed: 1780s and later extensions
- Client: Thomas Rumbold

Technical details
- Structural system: brick; limited use of Coade stone and Portland stone

Design and construction
- Architect: Thomas Leverton

Woodhall Park is a Grade I listed country house near Watton-at-Stone, Hertfordshire, England. The 18th century neo-classical building is set in a walled park in the Beane valley. It has been the home of Heath Mount School since the 1930s.

== History ==
Thomas Rumbold, who was later made a baronet, acquired the Woodhall estate using the fortune he had made in India. One of his partners at Chittagong, Harry Verelst helped with the financing. The estate and its manor house were originally home to the Butler or Boteler family.

The architect Thomas Leverton was commissioned by Rumbold to design a new house to replace the manor house on a nearby site. Rumbold became Governor of Madras in 1778 and made arrangements for work to continue on the house in his absence, payments being made from his account at Goslings Bank. Suffering from poor health, he returned to England in 1780. The East India Company, unhappy about the Second Anglo-Mysore War, dismissed him the following year. He continued to serve as a Member of Parliament until 1790.

When Rumbold died in 1791, he was, according to the Oxford Dictionary of National Biography, insolvent. Under the terms of his will, the property was sold to benefit the children of his second marriage. It was acquired by Paul Benfield, who extended the house. His architect is not known. Benfield, who has been described as "perhaps the most notorious of the nabobs", went bankrupt. The estate was bought by Samuel Smith in 1801.

== Architecture ==
Leverton's designs were exhibited at the Royal Academy in 1777.

=== Interior ===
Describing Leverton's work at Woodhall Park, Nikolaus Pevsner said that his interiors "have a style, decidedly their own, different from Adam's or Chambers's or Holland's" their character coming out most clearly in the central staircase hallway, "profusely but very delicately decorated with plaster à la antique".

== Park ==
Woodhall Park
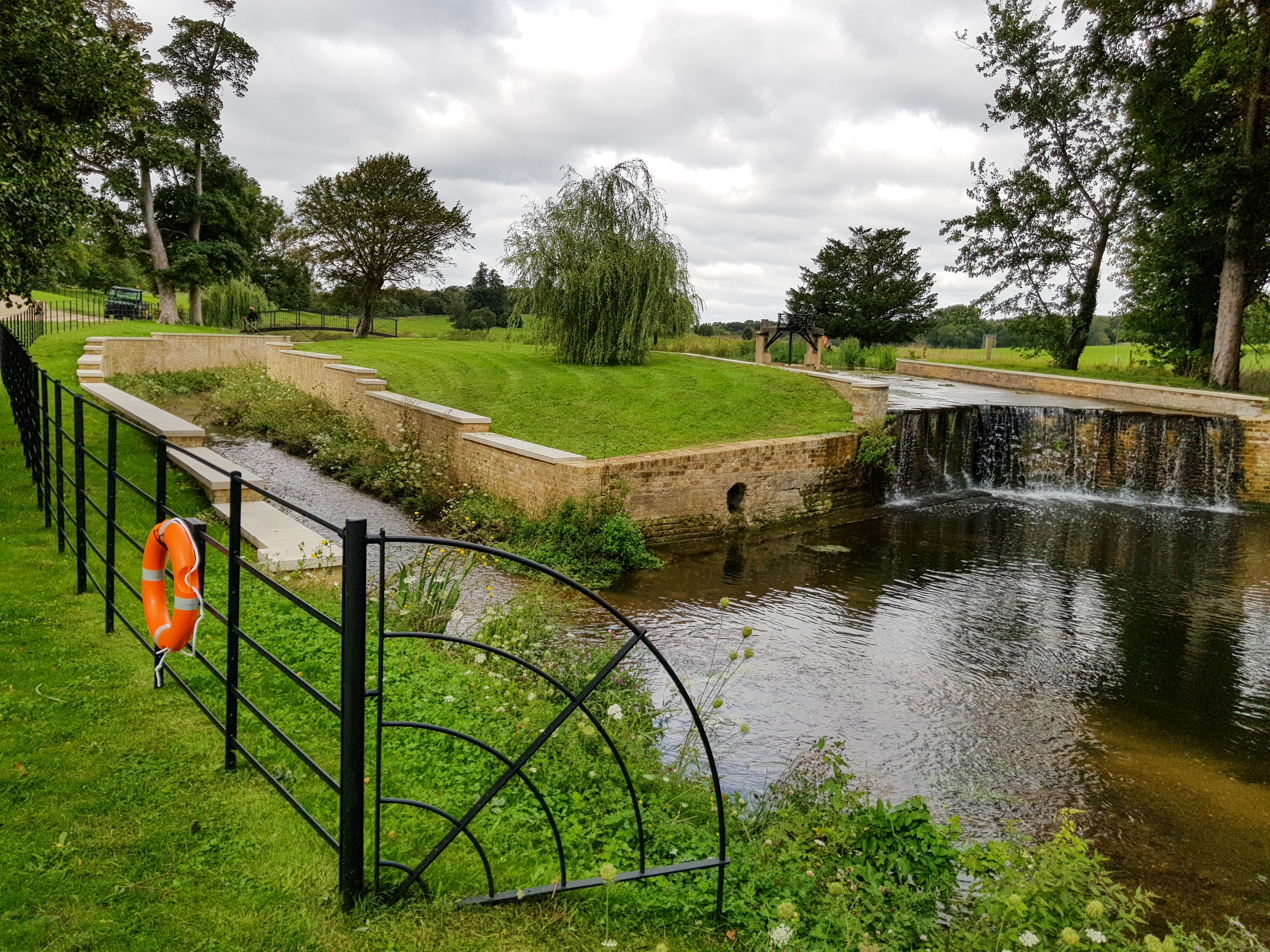
- Cascade, weir and sluice on river Beane
- Interactive map of Woodhall Park
- Type: Park and garden

National Register of Historic Parks and Gardens
- Official name: Woodhall Park
- Designated: 1987
- Reference no.: 1000317

Philip Boteler obtained a licence to create a park in the 16th century. The present appearance of the park reflects landscaping done in the late 18th century for Rumbold. A weir was constructed to hold back the River Beane to create a "broadwater" within sight of the house. In the 21st-century a new channel was dug bypassing the weir to allow fish migration.

As a young man, Joseph Paxton was employed at Woodhall Park by Samuel Smith. He was an apprentice to Smith's gardener, William Griffin. At that time, the garden appears to have had good facilities for fruit growing, one of the activities for which Paxton later achieved fame when working for the Duke of Devonshire. The walled kitchen garden is listed grade II.

The park was listed in 1987 in the Register of Historic Parks and Gardens of Special Historic Interest in England.

=== Boundary wall ===
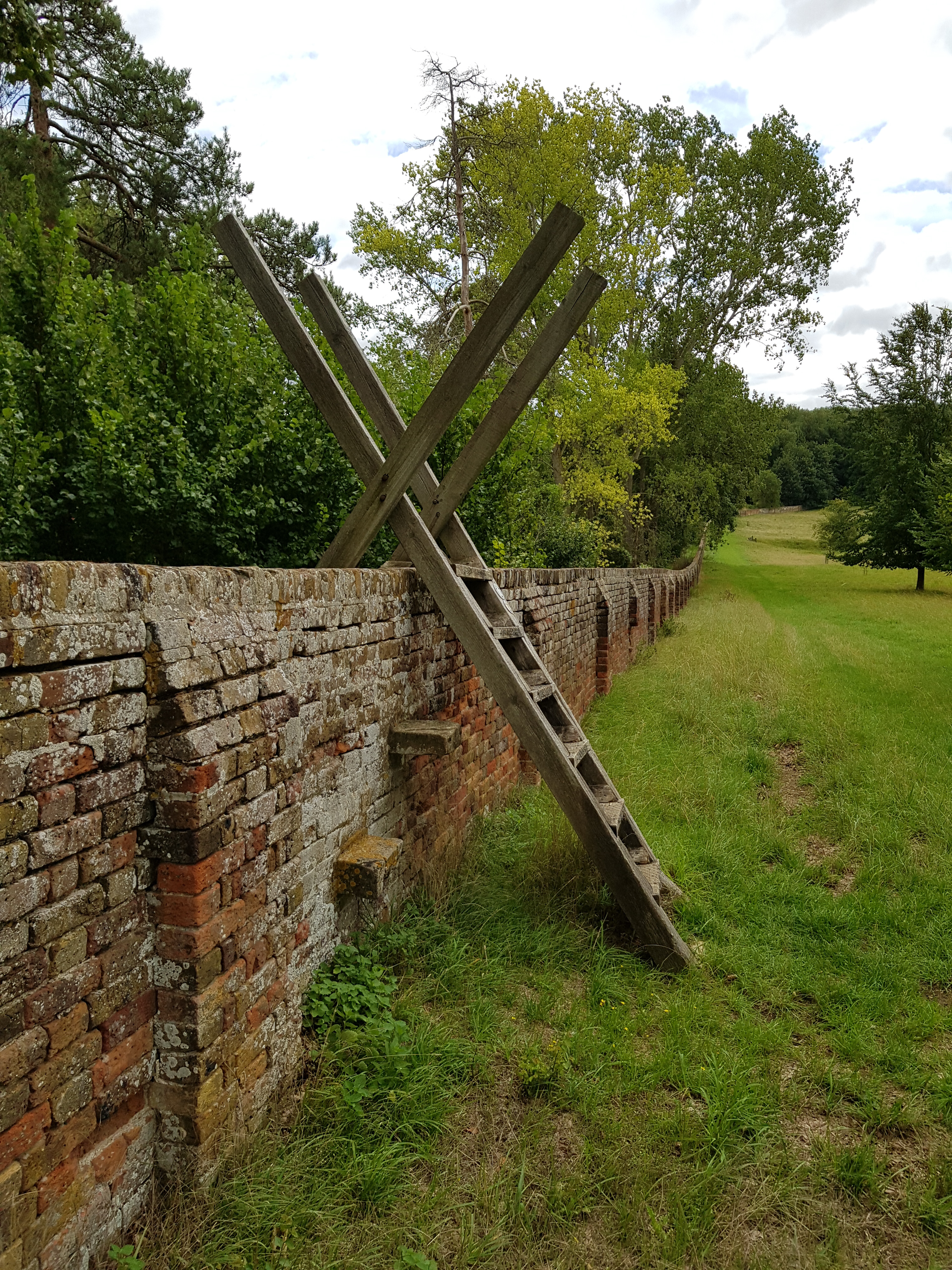
Boundary wall with ladder stile

In the 19th century the Smith family diverted the route of the turnpike between Watton and Ware, moving it further from the house. The boundary of the park is marked by a brick wall along this road (now part of the A602) and also along the road between Watton and Hertford (now part of the A119). There are gatekeepers' lodges controlling access from both roads. "Hertford Lodge East" is dated circa 1870; "Ware Lodge", dated circa 1840, is in Greek Revival style and Grade II listed.
