= Woodford Hall =

House in Woodford, Essex, England

Coordinates: 51°35′54″N 0°01′10″E

Crowe's Estate Act 1727
- Act of Parliament
- Parliament of Great Britain
- Long title: An Act to enable Christopher Crowe, of Woodford Hall, in the County of Essex, Esquire, to sell, or otherwise dispose of, the Mansion-house called Woodford Hall, and all other his Lands and Hereditaments at Woodford, comprized in his Settlement thereof; he having settled other Lands and Hereditaments, in the County of York, of greater Value, to the same Uses, in Lieu thereof.
- Citation: 1 Geo. 2. St. 2. c. 8 Pr.
- Territorial extent: Great Britain

Dates
- Royal assent: 17 April 1728
- Commencement: 23 January 1728 (Note: Start of session.)

Status: Current legislation

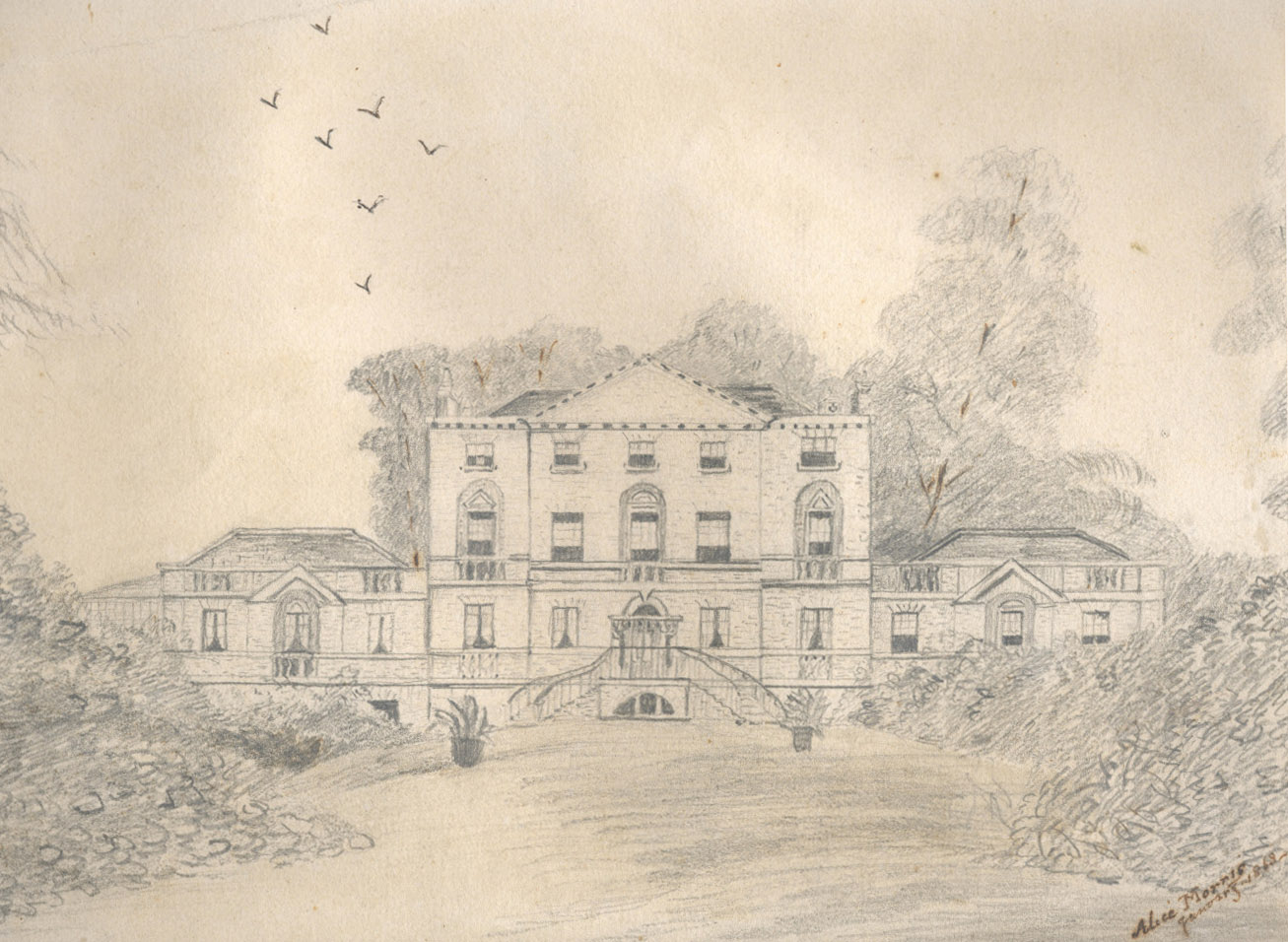
Drawing of Woodford Hall by William Morris's sister Alice

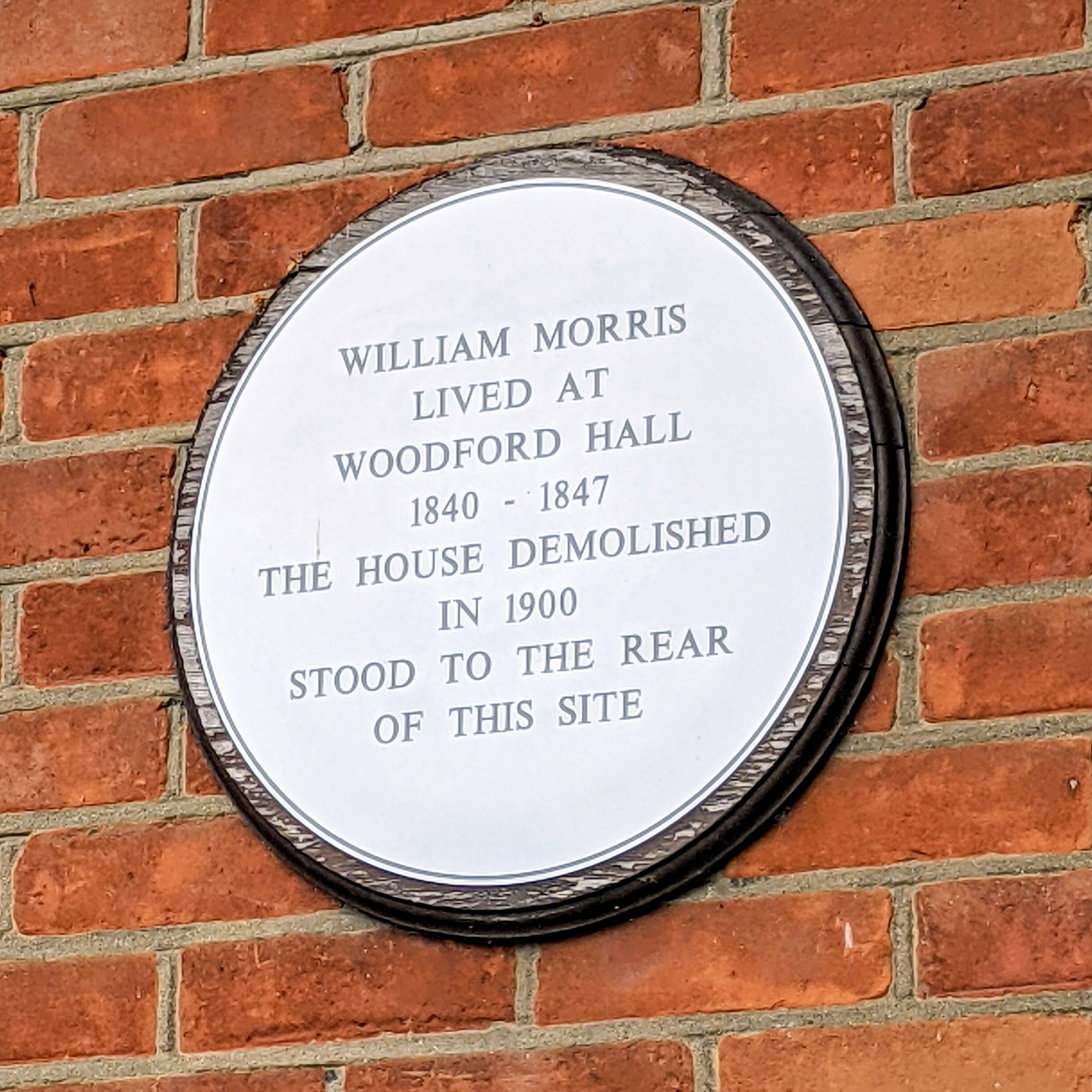
A plaque mentioning Woodford Hall on the Woodford Parish Church Memorial Hall

Woodford Hall was a large house in Woodford, Essex, with 50 acres of land adjacent to Epping Forest.

In 1707, Sir Richard Child sold the Hall to Christopher Crowe, who sold it to William Hunt in 1728, having obtained a private act of Parliament, Crowe's Estate Act 1727 (1 Geo. 2. St. 2. c. 8 Pr.). It remained in the Hunt family until 1801, when it was sold to the politician John Maitland.

It was built or rebuilt in 1775 by the architect Thomas Leverton. In 1777, it was leased to John Goddard, a Rotterdam merchant, whose widow died there in 1814, after which Maitland moved in, dying there in 1831.

William Whitaker Maitland, his son, inherited the property, and leased it to William Cox, and in 1840, to William Morris, father of William Morris the textile designer, poet, and socialist activist, then aged 6. In 1847, his father died unexpectedly, and in 1848, the family moved nearby to the smaller Water House.

In 1869 the Woodford Hall estate was sold to British Land for redevelopment, but was used as Mrs. Gladstone's convalescent home until 1900, when it was demolished.

In 1902, the Parish Church Memorial Hall was built at the front of the site.
