= Whempstead =

Hamlet in Hertfordshire, England

Coordinates: 51°52′N 0°05′W

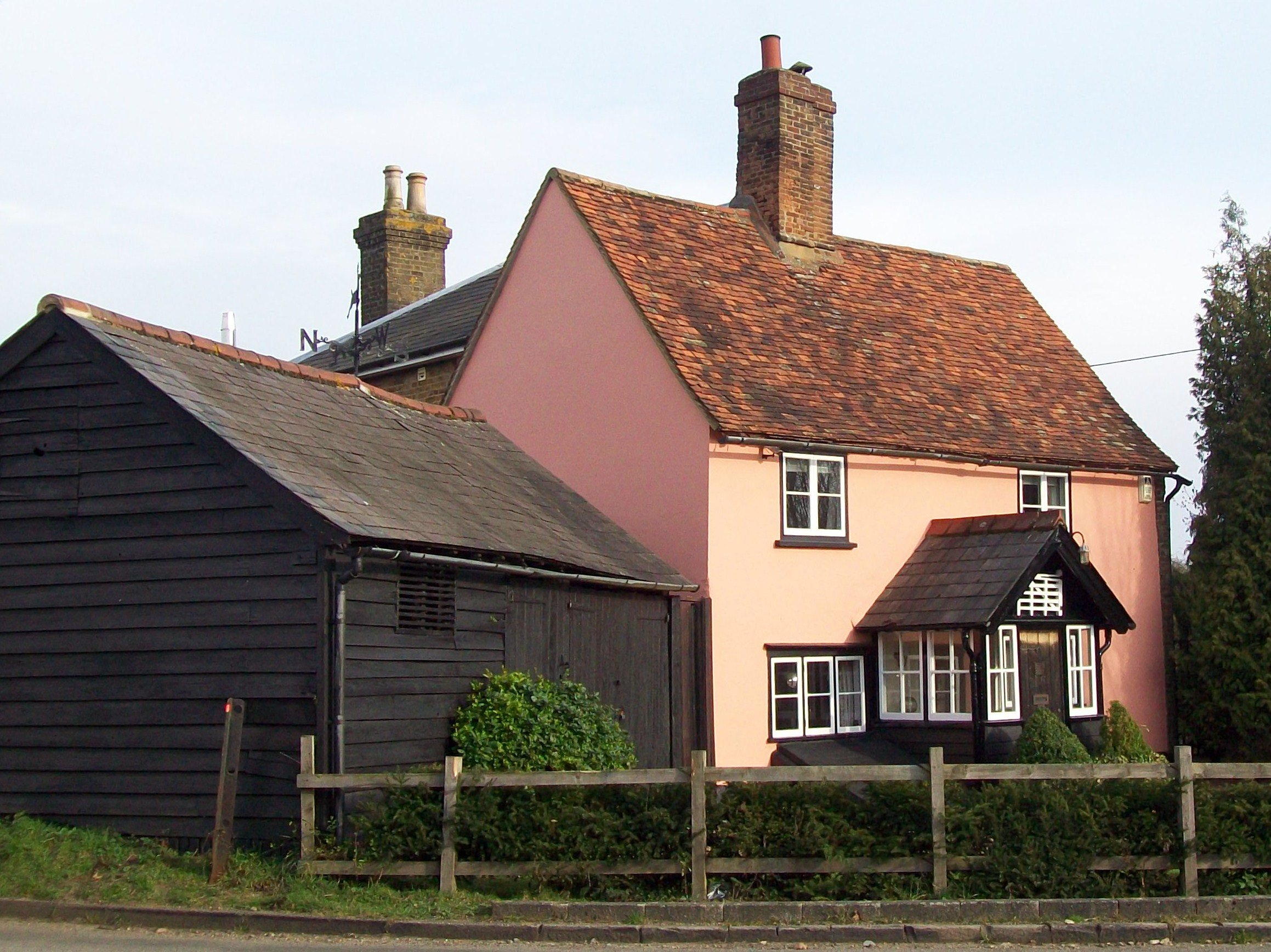
Gate Cottage, Whempstead

Whempstead is a hamlet in the parish of Watton-at-Stone, situated north of Hertford and to the south-east of Stevenage in Hertfordshire, it is close to the villages of Benington and Dane End. The hamlet consists of approximately 15 houses and several farms. All of the surrounding landscape is given over to agriculture. In 1390 a chapel was built at Whempstead, dedicated to the honour of the Blessed Virgin. In 1548 there was a dissolution of the chapel as it was in decay, but some of the buildings survived to the late 1800s, situated at the present Chapel Farm. By 1749 the number of houses had grown to the extent that the hamlet was large enough to be visible on a map of Hertfordshire for the first time. There was a public house The Gate although this closed in the 1960s.
