= The Sele School =

Location
- Welwyn Road; Hertford, Hertfordshire, SG14 2DG; England; 51°47′56″N 0°06′09″W

Information
- Type: Academy
- Department for Education URN: 138484 Tables
- Ofsted: Reports
- Headteacher: Chris Quach
- Gender: Coeducational
- Age: 11 to 18
- Website: http://www.sele.herts.sch.uk

The Sele School is a coeducational secondary school and sixth form with academy status, located in Hertford, Hertfordshire, in the south east of England. The school is situated adjacent to the Sele Farm estate, a major housing area containing a mixture of private and housing association properties. The school serves the Hertford area, with pupils coming from local villages as well as the town.

The school was forced to temporarily halt their sixth form intake; no students started year 12 in both 2022 and 2023.
