= Christopher Crowe (diplomat) =

English consul and landowner

Christopher Crowe (c. 1681 – 9 November 1749) was an English consul and landowner.

In 1705, aged 24, Crowe was appointed English Consul at Livorno, Grand Duchy of Tuscany. He was awarded the "lucrative" contract to supply the British Mediterranean fleet with wine and olive oil during the War of the Spanish Succession, from 1703 to 1711.

He also worked as a prize agent for captured enemy merchant ships, and acquired artworks on behalf of the English nobility, and grew rich.

In 1707, he bought Woodford Hall, a large house and estate in Woodford, Essex, adjacent to Epping Forest from Sir Richard Child.

In 1715, he married Charlotte Lee, Lady Baltimore who had been married to Benedict Leonard Calvert, 4th Baron Baltimore, and they had four children:

- Christopher Crowe (1716–1776)
- Catherine Crowe (1717 – 1782)
- Charlotte Crowe (1718–1742)
- George Crowe (25 November 1719 – 10 October 1782)

In 1722, he bought Kiplin Hall for £7000 from his stepson, Charles Calvert.

In 1728, he sold Woodford Hall to William Hunt in 1727, having obtained a private act of Parliament, Crowe's Estate Act 1727 (1 Geo. 2. St. 2. c. 8 Pr.), to do so.
