= A602 road =

Road in England

A602

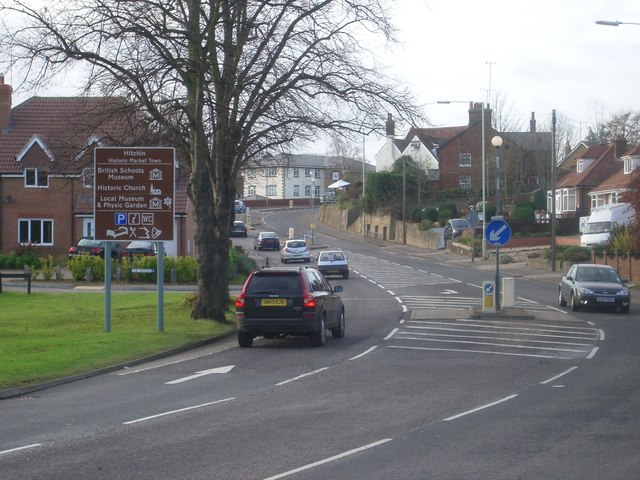

Major junctions
- Northwest end: Hitchin
- A1(M); A10 A119 A1072 A1155 A505
- Southeast end: Ware

Location
- Country: United Kingdom
- Primary destinations: Stevenage

Road network
- Roads in the United Kingdom; Motorways; A and B road zones

The A602 is a road linking Hitchin in Hertfordshire, England, with A10 at Ware in Hertfordshire, via Stevenage.

The course of the road has changed significantly since the 1960s with the construction of several bypasses and relief roads.

In Hitchin, the road starts at a junction with the A505, and follows a relief road round the south of the town centre, before re-joining the course of the original route for 0.9 miles (1.4 km).

The village of Little Wymondley is bypassed by a dual carriageway route to the A1 junction at Corey's Mill.

In Stevenage, the road takes two courses through the town – the first is a concurrency with the A1 round the new town to the junction at Langley Sidings. The second is a route through the town itself, following closely the route of the old Great North Road. The two routes converge and form a northern bypass for the suburb of Broadwater (the old Hertford Road through Broadwater has been closed to motor vehicles since the 1990s, to prevent rat-running).

The next 3 km of road is the only remaining original piece of the route, travelling through the villages of Bragbury End and Hooks Cross. The next feature is a roundabout, and the road once again diverges from its original course and takes a left to bypass the village of Watton-at-Stone. At the eastern end of the Watton-at-Stone bypass (constructed in the late 1980s) it reaches another roundabout.

In the 1970s, the road continued from this point straight ahead down what is now the A119 to Hertford, and then travelled along the course of what is now the B1197 through Hertford Heath to Hoddesdon. With the opening of the A10 Hoddesdon and Ware bypass in the late 1970s, the A602 temporarily terminated at the A414 in Hertford. In 1987, with the opening of the Tonwell bypass, the road was completely re-routed along the course of the B1001 from Watton-at-Stone to meet the modern A10 at Ware. The B1001 itself remains for a short distance, linking the modern A10 with the old road in the town centre (now known as the A1170).

== Future developments ==
=== A602 Corridor Improvements ===
A602 Corridor Improvements
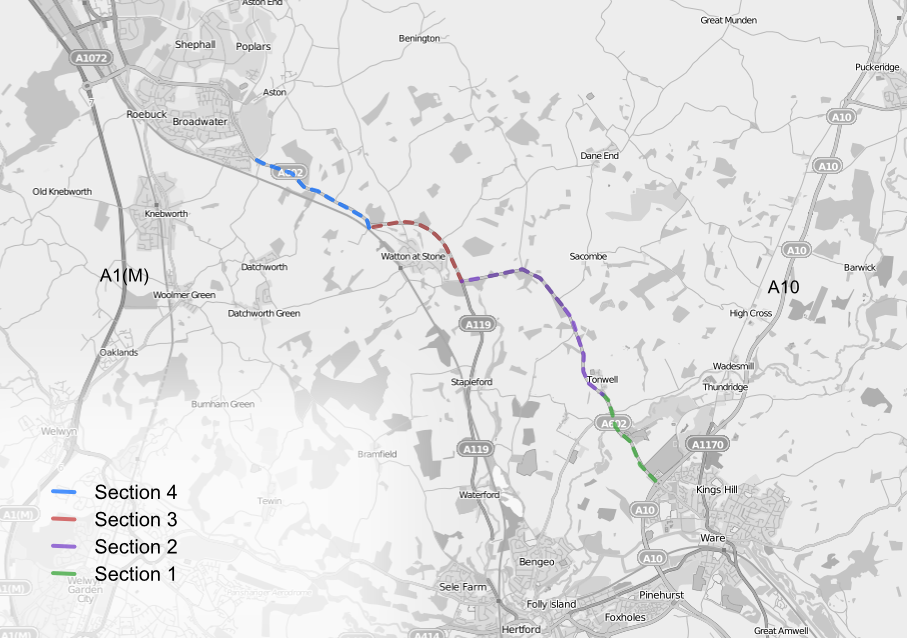
- Location: Hertfordshire
- Proposer: Hertfordshire County Council
- Status: proposed
- Type: Road
- Cost estimate (high): £15.8 million
- Cost estimate (low): £14.3 million
- Start date: Summer 2007
- Geometry: KML

Due to the old nature of the road it suffers from congestion, substandard structure and a high level of accidents. As such a series of developments along much of its stretch where proposed in the 2006-2011 Local Transport Plan. These comprise a number of different schemes but are put forward together under the collective title of 'A602 Corridor Improvements'. The various schemes involve work on junctions, road re-alignment to make severe bends safer, structural maintenance and road safety schemes. It also considers the construction of a bypass at Hooks Cross but this remains in the early proposal stage. In 2006 the estimate cost of the whole strategy was given as between £14.3 and £15.8 million. Each individual scheme is intended to be brought forward as and when funding becomes available. The section between Sacombe Pound and Watton-at-Stone gained planning permission for work to commence in summer 2007 though work was never started, so all sections remain at the proposal stage.
