= Stapleford railway station =

Former railway station in England

Coordinates: 51.83391°N 0.10121°W

Stapleford
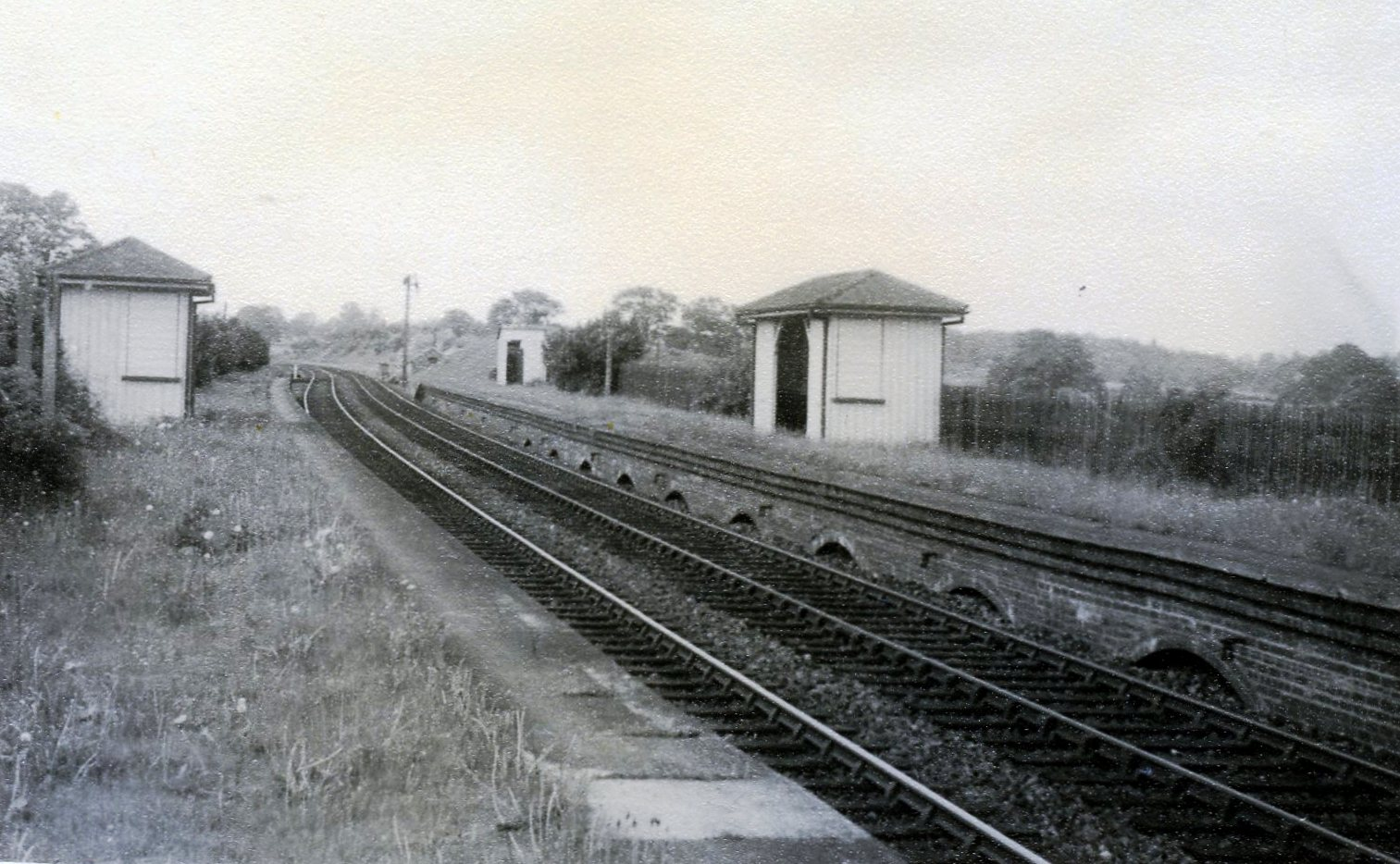

General information
- Location: Stapleford, Herts, District of East Hertfordshire; England
- Grid reference: TL309167
- Platforms: 2

Other information
- Status: Disused

History
- Original company: London and North Eastern Railway
- Post-grouping: London and North Eastern Railway

Key dates
- 2 June 1924: Station opened
- 10 September 1939: Station closed
Location

Stapleford railway station was a station on the Hertford Loop Line, and was situated in the village of Stapleford, Hertfordshire, England.

== History ==
The station was opened by the London and North Eastern Railway on 2 June 1924. It was situated on the Hertford Loop Line, between Hertford North and Watton-at-Stone. Like Watton-at-Stone, it was closed on 10 September 1939; but unlike Watton-at-Stone, Stapleford was not later reopened. It remains as the only closed station on the entire line.

== Routes ==
Preceding station	Historical railways	Following station
Hertford North; Line and station open	London and North Eastern Railway; Hertford Loop Line	Watton-at-Stone; Line and station open
