= Watton-at-Stone railway station =

Railway station in Hertfordshire, England

Watton-at-Stone
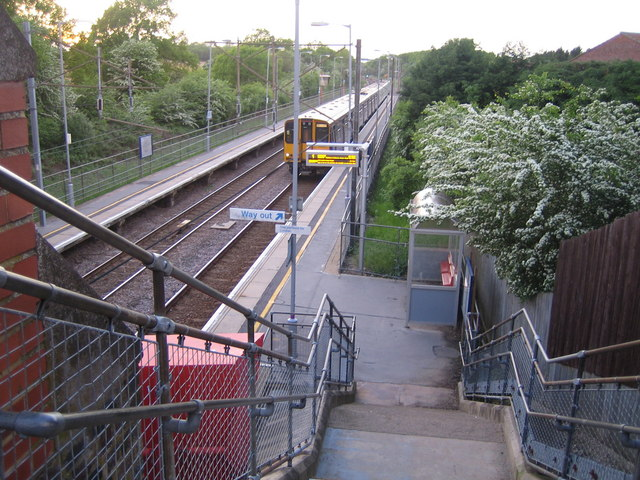

General information
- Location: Watton-at-Stone, District of East Hertfordshire; England
- Coordinates: 51.8569°N 0.1198°W
- Grid reference: TL295192
- Managed by: Great Northern
- Platforms: 2

Other information
- Station code: WAS
- Classification: DfT category E

History
- Original company: London and North Eastern Railway
- Post-grouping: London and North Eastern Railway

Key dates
- 2 June 1924: Opened
- 10 September 1939: Closed
- 17 May 1982: Reopened

Passengers
- 2020–21: ▼42,870
- 2021–22: ▲0.114 million
- 2022–23: ▲0.142 million
- 2023–24: ▲0.159 million
- 2024–25: ▲0.168 million
Location
Notes
- Passenger statistics from the Office of Rail and Road

Watton-at-Stone railway station serves the village of Watton-at-Stone in Hertfordshire, England. It is 23 miles 72 chains (23.90 miles, 38.46 km) down the line from London King's Cross on the Hertford Loop Line between Hertford North and Stevenage and is served by trains operated by Great Northern.

== History ==
According to the Watton-at-Stone Parish Council, a proposal for a rail route between London and Stevenage was approved by Parliament in 1898, though construction did not begin until 1906. A single-track section through Watton-at-Stone opened on 4 March 1918, with the track later being dualled.

The station saw its first passenger train run through on 6 February 1920, but did so only when a train was diverted from the East Coast Main Line as the result of an accident. Scheduled passenger services of four trains per day started on 2 June 1924, stopping on request at Watton-at-Stone.

The station's life as a passenger service was short-lived however, and it closed just 15 years later on 10 September 1939, despite the famed locomotive engineer Nigel Gresley's residency in the village.

The nationalised British Railways considered reopening the station in the 1960s, but it was not until 1981 that a campaign to reopen the station gathered momentum. The bulk of the £120,000 costs were paid for by Hertfordshire County Council and British Rail, but villagers and the parish council responded to a public appeal for funds, and together contributed £8,000. On 17 May 1982, a small crowd gathered to board the 06:23 service from Watton-at-Stone to Moorgate, the first passenger train to serve the village in almost 43 years.

== Services ==
All services at Watton-at-Stone are operated by Great Northern using Class 717 EMUs.

The typical off-peak service in trains per hour is:

- 2 tph to Moorgate via Hertford North
- 2 tph to Stevenage

Preceding station	National Rail	Following station
Hertford North	Great Northern Hertford Loop Line	Stevenage
	Historical railways	
Stapleford Line open, station closed	London and North Eastern Railway Hertford Loop Line	Stevenage Line and station open

== Cultural references ==
In 1977, track in the vicinity of the then closed station was used by British Transport Films as a set to film the notorious public information film The Finishing Line. Using shock tactics to deter children from playing near railway lines, the film was staged as a dream sequence of a parody school sports day with 'events' on and around the track. Local schoolchildren were drafted as actors. The film was broadcast on the nightly Nationwide TV show, and the liberal quantities of stage blood and graphic depiction of injuries became a matter of some controversy.
