= Watton-at-Stone =

Village in Hertfordshire, England

Coordinates: 51.8580°N 0.1130°W

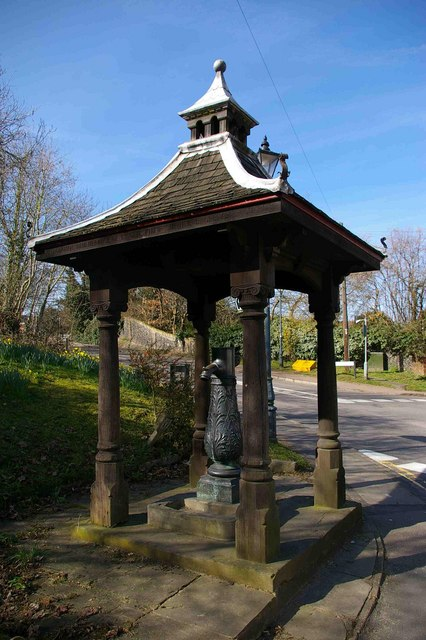
- Village cast iron water pump, dating from the late 19th century

- Location within Hertfordshire
- Population: 2,616 (Parish, 2021)
- OS grid reference: TL299194
- District: East Hertfordshire
- Shire county: Hertfordshire
- Region: East
- Country: England
- Sovereign state: United Kingdom
- Post town: HERTFORD
- Postcode district: SG14
- Dialling code: 01920
- Police: Hertfordshire
- Fire: Hertfordshire
- Ambulance: East of England
- UK Parliament: North East Hertfordshire

Watton-at-Stone is a village and civil parish in the East Hertfordshire district of Hertfordshire, England. It lies 4 miles (6 km) north of Hertford, its post town, and 5 miles (8 km) south-east of the centre of Stevenage. It lies in the valley of the River Beane and is served by Watton-at-Stone railway station. As well as the village itself, the parish also covers surrounding rural areas, including the hamlet of Whempstead and much of the Woodhall Park estate. At the 2021 census, the parish had a population of 2,616.

== History ==
=== Etymology ===
The name Watton first appeared in writing in an 11th-century collection of 10th-century Anglo-Saxon wills as Wattun. It was later recorded in the Domesday Book of 1086 as both Wodtune and Watone. The origin of the word is uncertain, and is variously ascribed to Old English wád or woad, and ton meaning small farming settlement; or waden meaning ford; or from waétan meaning watery.

The suffix -at-Stone dates from the early 13th century and may be derived from the presence of two large examples of Hertfordshire puddingstone, now situated at the former Waggon and Horses public house. However, it is far more likely that the suffix refers to the Roman road (anciently described as a Stone Street) that ran from Verulamium (modern St Albans), fording the River Beane at Watton-at-Stone. The area where the bridge over the railway was built was shown on tithe maps as a common, and the fields to the east and west of this point were named Stoneyfield and Further Stoneyfield. It is deduced that the Roman Road passed through this area, and the later village took its name from the important routeway. In the 1950s, sections of the road agger or embankment, composed of large flint nodules, could still be seen at several points in the village; most obviously, the northern boundary of the grounds of Chestnut House preserves the line of the road

=== Prehistoric archaeological finds ===
Archaeological finds indicate prehistoric activity in the Watton-at-Stone area before the village was established. The earliest finds are Paleolithic hand axes found in the village and also at the Frogmore gravel pit, and there are traces of a Mesolithic site near the roundabout at the northern end of the bypass. Neolithic pits were found off Station Road and several Neolithic or Bronze Age ring ditches are evident in fields surrounding Watton.

To the west of the village near Raffin Green is a significant late Bronze Age site and Iron Age enclosure in the Great Humphreys field. It was close to here that the Iron Age Aston Mirror was found, closer to Watton-at-Stone than to the village of Aston, but technically in Aston parish due to the convoluted border. It is now kept at the British Museum. Another Iron Age enclosure was located by Broom Hall Farm, with an adjacent Roman farmstead and also a nearby Roman crematorium from which 27 burials were extracted. A collection of possibly Belgic armour and weaponry was discovered in the mid-19th century by workers digging a drain to the west of the village.

=== Roman and Anglo-Saxon origins ===
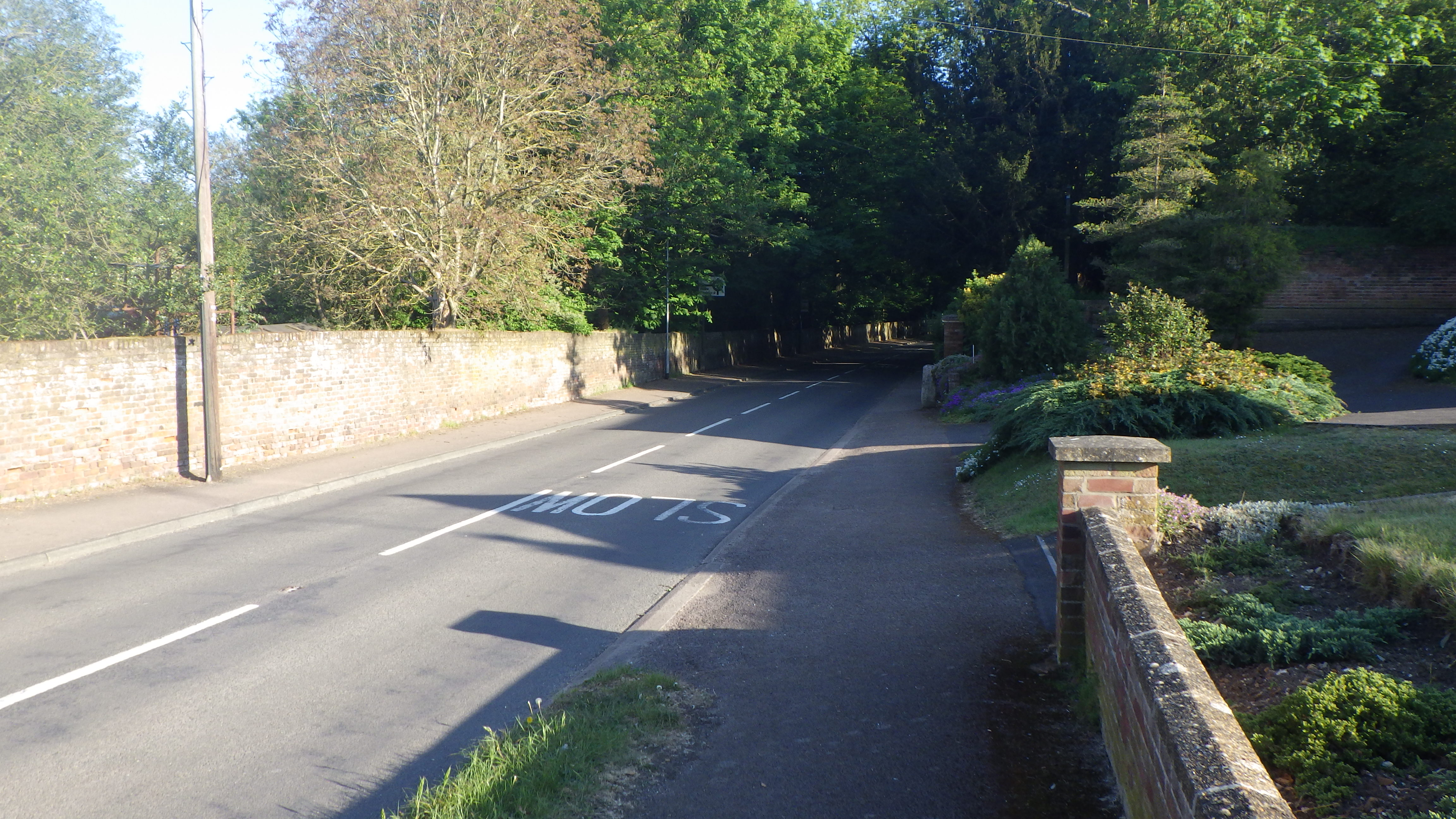
The point where the Roman road crossed the High Street

The origins of Watton-at-Stone are from the construction of the Roman road, which crossed the High Street at the point of the modern milestone. Archaeological evidence suggests significant Roman activity at the roadside, with a probable Roman building near the Rectory and Roman field boundaries off Station Road suggesting some permanent occupation. Watton was possibly a market place trading to travellers as they slowed to cross the River Beane, and the High Street may have been a pre-existing track and therefore the new Roman road formed a crossroads here.

Anglo-Saxon settlers developed Watton further into a village, with evidence of early Anglo-Saxon field boundaries and a crematorium off Station Road. It is likely that the focus of the Anglo-Saxon settlement was on the high ground at Watton Green, overlooking the Roman road and river valley below. There was a possible battle between the Danes and Saxons which took place on a field named "Danesfield" to the west of the village, although the field name is the only evidence to suggest this. If a battle did occur here it would most likely to have been in 911 with 1016 suggested as an alternative possible date.

The Watton manor was anciently held by the Crown but by 1066 the Lord of Watton manor was Alwin Horne, an Anglo-Saxon thegn who owned other lands at Walkern, Sacombe and Middlesex. Alwin Horne is believed to have fought at the Battle of Stamford Bridge under King Harold in 1066 and later that year killed at the Battle of Hastings.

=== Middle Ages and early modern period ===
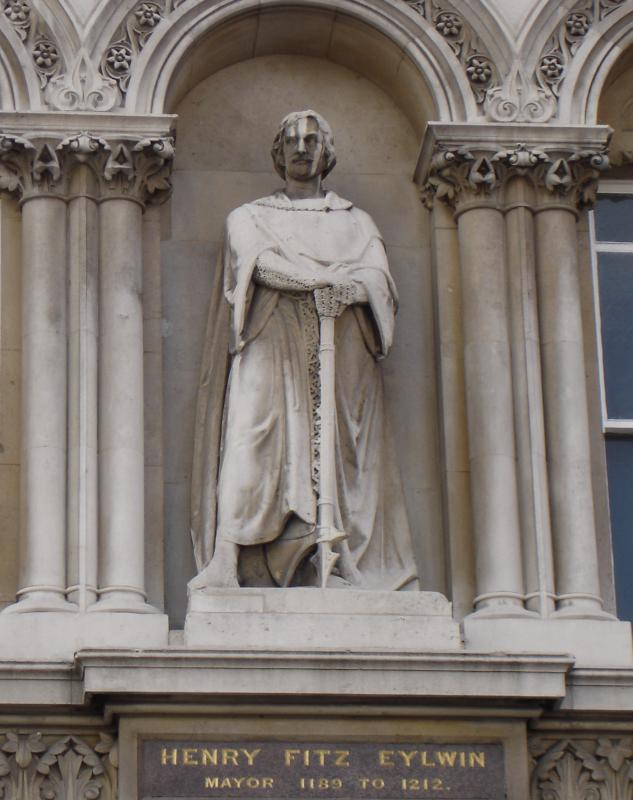
Henry fitz Ailwin statue at Holborn Viaduct, London

The Domesday Book of 1086 states that Watton village then consisted of 18 households (10 villagers, 4 smallholders and 4 slaves), suggesting a population of between 65 and 90. The manor was worth £5 and it had a mill, woodland with 100 pigs and a meadow. It was jointly held by Derman (of London) and Alward (the noble), who were both moneyers from London. There was an additional manor associated with Watton that had 6 households and a church, which could have been the Woodhall manor. The first mention by name of the Woodhall manor was in about 1130 when it was held by Ralph de Watton.

Derman's great nephew Henry fitz Ailwin, the first Mayor of London, inherited the Watton manor in 1165. He built a hermitage chapel in what is now Chapel Wood and possibly built a new manor house in what is now Well Wood. At about this time, perhaps as a consequence of Henry fitz Ailwin's new buildings, a new manor called Crowborough emerged from the Watton manor. Crowborough was first referenced in 1266 when it was held by Alice de Rivers. Crowborough Hall stood at Watton Green and the moat which surrounded it can still be seen to this day.

Hugh Bardolf inherited Watton manor in 1287, later it was held by John Bardolf and Thomas Bardolf with the Bardolf family owning the Watton and Crowborough manors at various times until 1562. During this period the house and chapel in Well Wood and Chapel Wood were abandoned, and so in circa 1520 the Watton manor was renamed Bardolf manor and the manor house moved to what is now Bardolphs Farm. A new manor called Watkins Hall was created and was first known to be held by Thomas Munden in about 1540.

Philip Boteler (Butler) inherited the Woodhall estate in about 1375 and later descendants to have the title included Philip Butler and John Boteler who held the Watton, Woodhall and Crowborough manors. The three estates were in possession of the Botelers (Butlers) until as late as 1780.

In 1662 brothers Maurice Thomson and Sir William Thompson, who had grown up in the village, founded Watton's first free school for 20 poor children.

After Woodhall was mostly destroyed by fire in 1771, from which an elderly John Boteler was able to escape, building of the new house began in 1775. The notorious Thomas Rumbold took possession of Woodhall in 1777, followed by Paul Benfield in 1793. The estate was then bought in 1801 by Samuel Smith and the Smith family later combined the Watton, Woodhall and Crowborough manors into one and still holds it today.

In later years, the natural springs in the area once made the village a popular spa town. The village has a number of dwellings dating from early Tudor, such as Watton Place, through to late Georgian constructions.

== Community ==
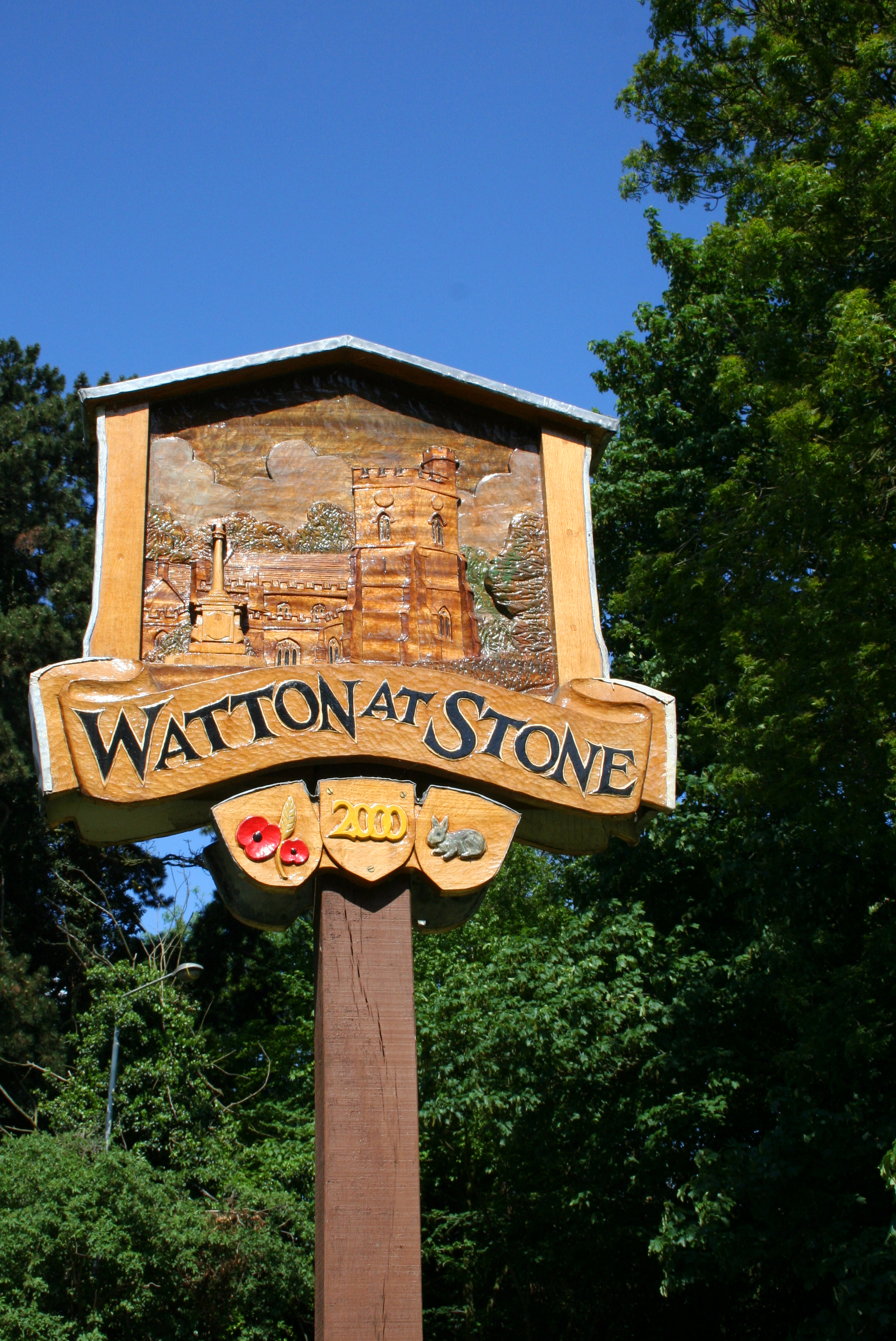
Village sign with unhyphenated name

For administration the parish falls under in East Hertfordshire District Council. The 2021 census showed a parish population of 2,614 living in 1,036 households.

There is little employment directly within the village and it largely serves as a dormitory for commuters to London or to the nearby towns with half-hourly trains to Moorgate station.

The village has a primary school and nursery school. The co-educational Heath Mount private school is located on the outskirts in the private estate of the Grade II* listed Woodhall Park.

The A602 formerly ran through the centre of the village between Stevenage and Hertford before a bypass was built in 1984 through farmland to the north-east. The section of the road to Hertford was renamed the A119, and the A602 then ran out of Watton-at-Stone to Ware. Watton-at-Stone is served by a railway station on the Hertford Loop Line. The station opened for passengers on 2 June 1924, was closed on 11 September 1939 (though the line continued to run through the village), and reopened on 17 May 1982, paid for partly by public subscription.

In the village itself there is a small convenience store, café and takeaway restaurant as well as a hairdressers and two pubs.

=== Alternative names ===
The name is also spelled unhyphenated as Watton at Stone and appears in this form on Ordnance Survey maps. The County and Parish Councils favour the hyphenated version, it appearing in that form on their respective websites and literature. Both variants are valid. Locally, the '-at-Stone' suffix is frequently dropped.

=== Church of St Mary and St Andrew ===
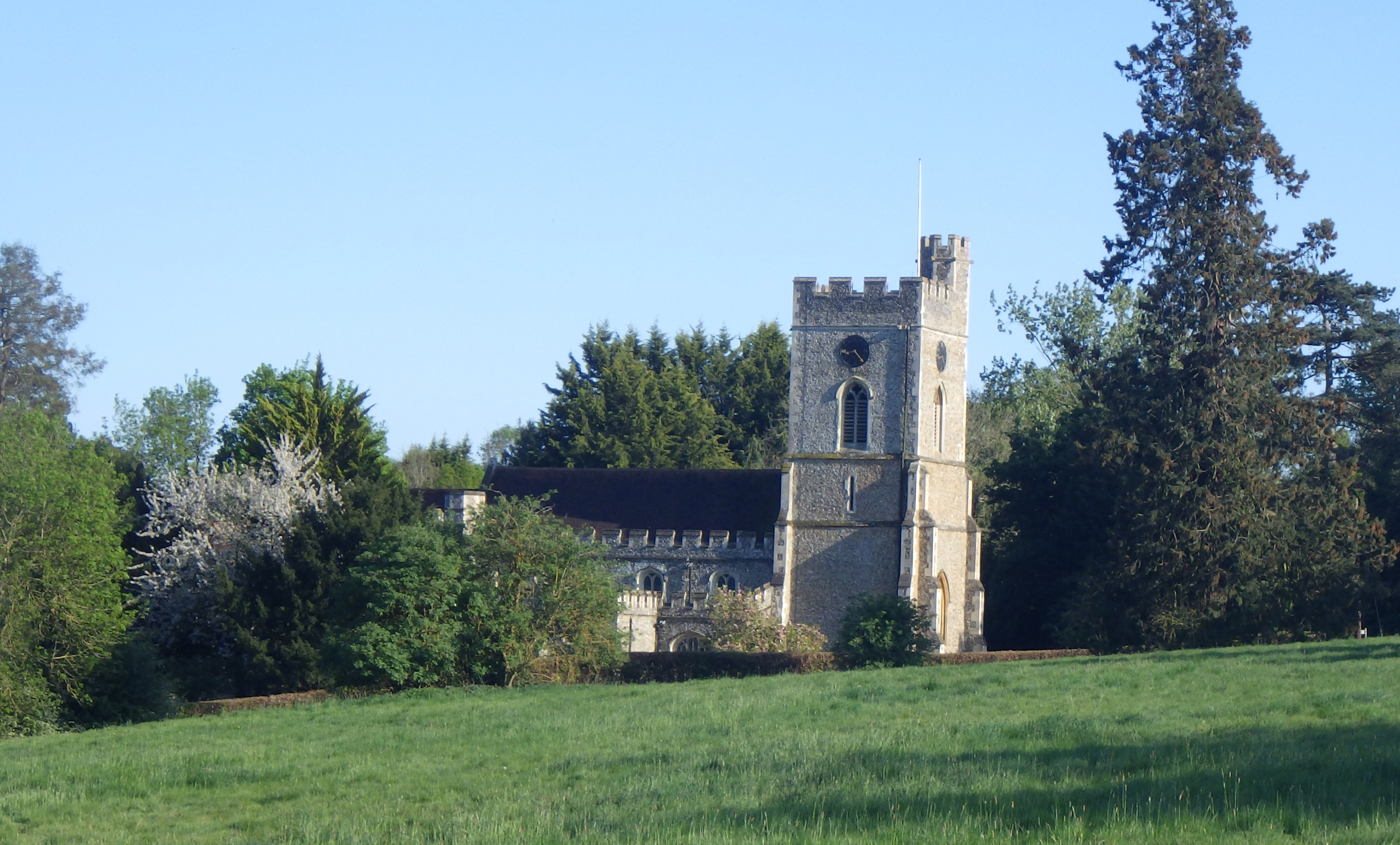
St Andrew and St Mary's Church

The parish church is dedicated to St Andrew and St Mary. It stands on thirteenth-century foundations and dates from the early to mid-fifteenth century, and is built in the Perpendicular style. A chapel was added to the north side of the church in the late fifteenth century. The building is constructed from flint, and is protected by a Grade II* heritage listing. A war memorial lies in a field adjoining the church.

== Notable people ==
The evangelical author and social campaigner Edward Bickersteth was rector of the church for twenty years from 1830 until his death in 1850. His one-time curate was the theological scholar Thomas Birks.

Jack Meyer, the Somerset cricketer and founder of Millfield School grew up in the old Georgian red-brick rectory overlooking the cricket field, his father was the vicar of the church.

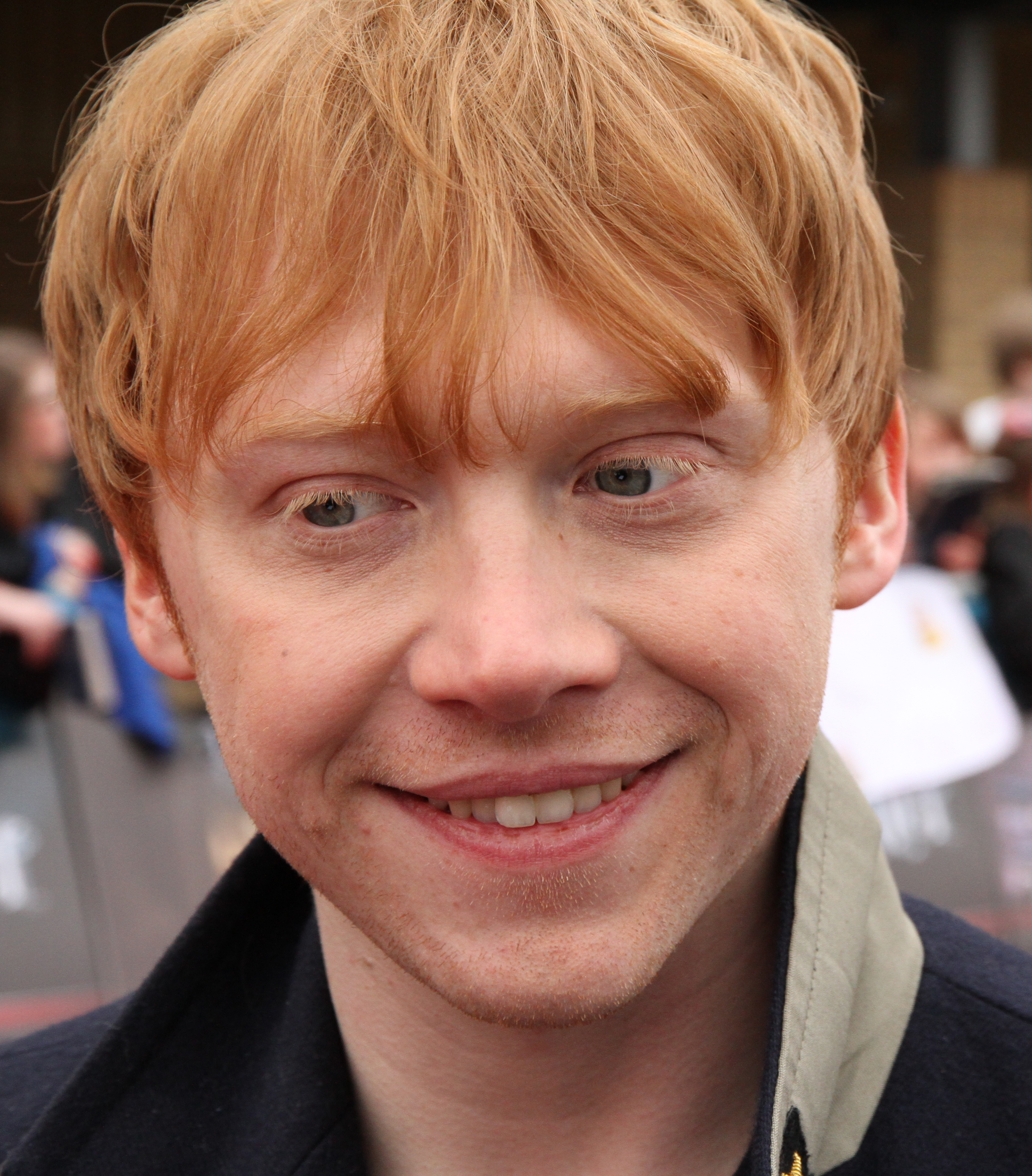
Rupert Grint in 2012

In the summer of 1923, Alan Turing and his family stayed with their friends the Meyer family for six weeks at the rectory, Alan being the founder of computer science and the leading cryptologist at Bletchley Park in World War II. Andrew Hodges in his biography: Alan Turing: The Enigma tells of how a gypsy fortune teller at the church fête foretold that he would be a genius.

The locomotive engineer Sir Nigel Gresley lived in Watton House until his death in 1941.

Watton-at-Stone was the childhood home of actor Rupert Grint.

Watton was home to the boxing promoter Frank Warren.

Footballer Harry Toffolo grew up in the village.

== In popular culture ==
The 2009 psychological horror found footage short film and web series No Through Road by Steven Chamberlain follows four seventeen-year-old teenagers en route to Stevenage who find themselves trapped in a time loop along two road signs marking an intersection between Benington and Watton.
