= Heath Mount School =

Independent school near Watton-at-Stone, Hertfordshire

Coordinates: 51°51′11″N 0°05′24″W

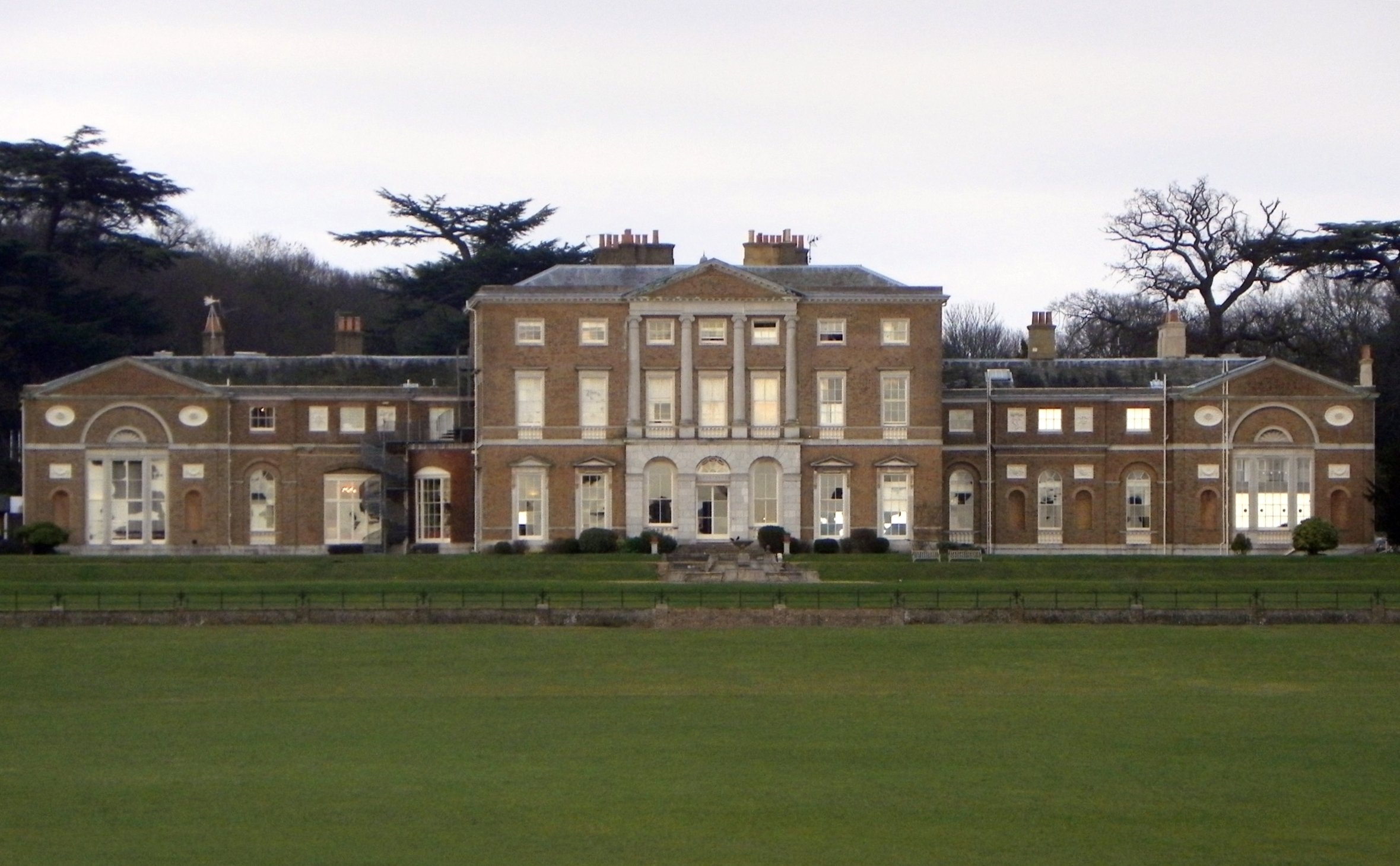
- Watton-at-Stone, Hertfordshire, SG14 3NG; England

Information
- Type: Independent
- Motto: "Loyal Devoir"
- Established: 1796
- Headmaster: Chris Gillam BEd (Hons)
- Gender: Co-educational
- Age: 3 to 13
- Houses: Galahad, Tristram and Percival
- Colours: Green and Blue
- Website: http://www.heathmount.org

Heath Mount School is a Church of England co-educational independent prep school near Watton-at-Stone, Hertfordshire, England. It admits pupils aged 3 to 13. It was founded as Heath Mount Academy in Hampstead in 1796. In 1934 it was relocated to a Georgian mansion on the Woodhall Estate in rural Hertfordshire. For the 2022 academic year, 498 students were enrolled: boarding pupils and day pupils and girls and boys.

== History ==
=== The school ===
Heath Mount was started as a boarding school in 1796 for the schooling of ‘boys and young gentlemen’. The first Headmaster, Reverend John Hunter, rented a house on Heath Street in Hampstead. The school was named "Heath Mount" because the site was close to the summit of Hampstead Heath. In 1875, Mr Bush, the fifth headmaster, moved to a school he established in the early 1860s at New End in Hampstead.

By the early 1930s the Hampstead School had rapidly grown and the New End site no longer met its requirements. In January 1934 the Headmaster, Reverend Arthur Wells, moved the school again with its 32 pupils to the present location at Woodhall Estate in Watton-at-Stone in Hertfordshire. The school amalgamated with a school called South Lodge from Sawbridgeworth, Herts in Autumn 1938. In September 1940 the school merged with the remnant of The Limes School of Croydon, Surrey which had evacuated to Langton Matravers, Dorset for the school year 1939/40. In 1939 the first girl was admitted to the school; she became a member of the cricket XI and won the Fielding Cup. In 1940 boys slept in the basement for a time because of air raids.

Heath Mount thrived in its new surroundings and continued as a school during the Second World War with a few girls admitted as a temporary measure; the school was not fully open to girls until 1976. The sports hall was built in 1984 and a preparatory school building established in 1990.

Heath Mount is now an independent school for boys and girls between the ages of 3 and 13. The school won the "Songs of Praise School Choir of the Year" competition in 2012 and came runners-up in the new format in 2019.

=== The house ===
The Woodhall Estate mansion, known as Woodhall Park, is a Grade I listed Georgian building built in the neo-classical style.

There are records of a house at Woodhall since 1372. However, the original structure named Woodhall was a large Tudor Manor that was positioned at the top of the Avenue and was home to the Boteler family until the 1770s.

It was Philip Boteler (d.1592), who gained the warrant to create a common around the house and thus founded Woodhall as an estate. This original park enlarged during the early and late seventeenth century, but it was not until 1838 that a herd of fallow deer were introduced and that the park wall, park railings, lodges, gatehouses and ha-ha in front of the house were built.

In 1771 the original house was damaged in a fire; Thomas Rumbold purchased the estate in 1774. He demolished the remnants of the house and built a new one devised by Thomas Leverton in 1777. This neo-classical house is still extant, although it was enlarged some years later. The house with the surrounding land was then purchased by Samuel Smith (1754–1834), a banker and a Member of Parliament, from Nottingham, in 1801. Four generations of Smiths occupied the house until 1930 after the death of the fourth, Colonel Abel Henry Smith. The contents of the house were dispersed and it became a school, later called Heath Mount School, in 1934.

== Notable former pupils ==
Notable former pupils from the school include Cecil Beaton, Gerald du Maurier, Esmond Harmsworth (Viscount Rothermere), Derek Walker-Smith (politician), Peter Tapsell (UK politician), Evelyn Waugh, Arnold Bax, John Lewis, Callum Ilott, Brooklyn Beckham and Jodie Williams.
