= Walkern =

Village in Hertfordshire, England

Coordinates: 51.92°N 0.13°W

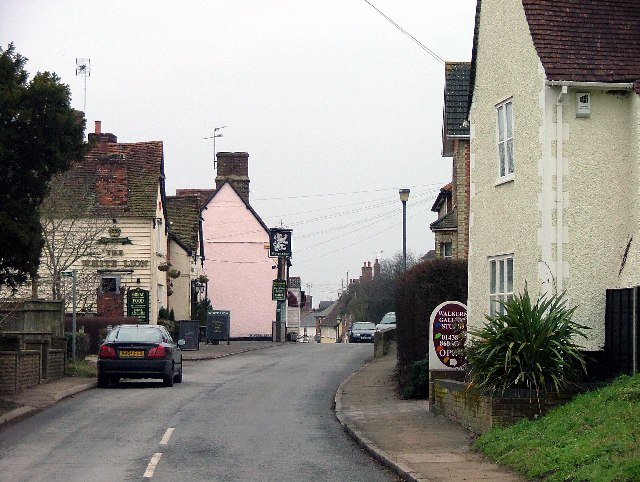
- Buildings on Walkern High Street including The White Lion

- Location within Hertfordshire
- Population: 1,491 (Parish, 2021)
- OS grid reference: TL363292
- District: East Hertfordshire
- Shire county: Hertfordshire
- Region: East
- Country: England
- Sovereign state: United Kingdom
- Post town: STEVENAGE
- Postcode district: SG2
- Dialling code: 01438
- UK Parliament: North East Hertfordshire

Walkern is a village and civil parish in the East Hertfordshire district of Hertfordshire, England. It lies in the valley of the River Beane, about 3 miles (5 km) east of the centre of Stevenage, its post town. At the 2021 census, the parish had a population of 1,491.

The village has several shops, including a convenience store, a hair and beauty salon, a craft shop, a shop that features homestyle products, a tea shop, a drum shop, a petrol station and Walkern Gallery near the White Lion public house. Other pubs include the Yew Tree. The village also has a primary school, doctors' surgery, recreation ground and a range of seasonal clubs; according to the time of year there is cricket, football and many other clubs based in the Walkern Sports and Community Centre towards the end of the village near the War Memorial and opposite a former watermill.

== History ==
The village appears as 'Walchra' in Domesday Book of 1086. It has been suggested that the name comes from the Old English wealc-ærn, ‘a fulling mill’ (see note^{1}). Whether or not the village is named after a mill, there has been a watermill in the village since medieval times. The surviving building is 19th-century, and is at the bottom of the High Street which runs parallel to the River Beane.

== Parish church of St Mary the Virgin ==
Most of the village is on the western side of the River Beane, which is a chalk stream. The village street of Church End crosses the river at a ford to reach the parish church. St Mary the Virgin is one of the oldest churches in Hertfordshire, with a Saxon wall and rare chalk rood (crucifix) dating to the mid-10th century.

== People from Walkern ==
=== William de Lanvalei ===
William de Lanvallei, also known as William de Lanvalei, was lord of Walkern in the early 13th century. He was one of the men designated as enforcers of Magna Carta. William died a couple of years after the great charter was formally granted by King John at Runnymede on 15 June 1215.

==== Legacy ====
There is an effigy in Walkern church, made from Purbeck Marble, which may be that of William. At the time of the 800th anniversary of the Magna Carta, Walkern twinned with Lanvallay in Brittany through the connection with this baron.

=== Jane Wenham ===
Walkern is noted as the home of Jane Wenham, who in 1712 was the last woman in England to be convicted of witchcraft and condemned to death (although the sentence was not carried out).

== Notes ==
1.

Fulling mills were sometimes known as ‘walk mills’ (wealc-ærn means ‘walk-house’) and were watermills where cloth was thickened by being pounded. However the placename is the only evidence for a mill at Walkern before the 12th century. Domesday Book records mills at other sites on the Beane, such as Sele Mill, but does not mention a mill at Walkern. A possible explanation for this is that the mills it records elsewhere were usually flour-mills, as these were a source of revenue for the lord of the manor.
