= Sele Mill =

Coordinates: 51.7977°N 0.0880°W

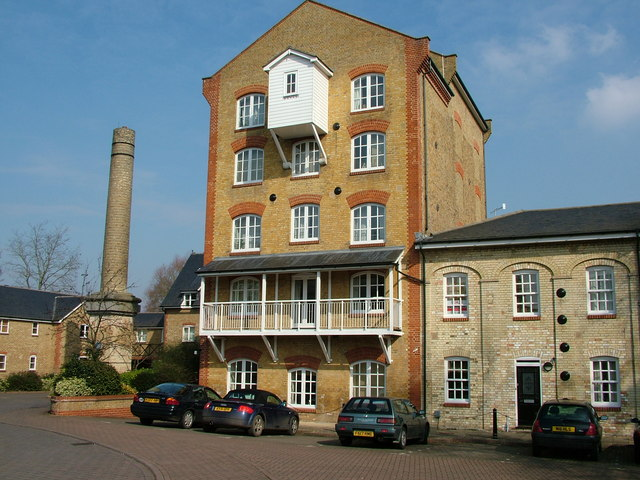
Sele Mill

Sele Mill is a late 19th-century mill building in Hertford, England. It has been converted into apartments. A blue plaque on the building (Plaque #30561 on Open Plaques) commemorates an earlier mill on the site, the country's first paper mill.

== History ==
For most of its history, the mill used the power of the River Beane, a chalk stream which joins the River Lea at Hertford. A watermill on this site is mentioned in the Domesday Book of 1086 when it was valued at 2 shillings. Sele at this time was a separate manor from Hertford. Its other resources included ploughland and meadow, but it appears to appears to have been a very small settlement: the recorded population was two households.

In the late 15th century it was converted into a paper mill by an entrepreneur called John Tate. There was considerable demand for paper in England. However, it appears to have been all imported, mainly from Italy. As far as is known, Sele was the first paper mill in England.

Papermills had a reputation for being smelly, but this one was visited by Henry VII. The king, who had given Hertford Castle to his wife in 1487, visited the mill in 1498 and returned the following year. There is evidence that he was given a supply of paper.

The papermill appears to have gone out of production around 1500, and the facility was used for grinding corn again. The mill was destroyed by fire in 1890 and was rebuilt. The 18th century miller's house survived the fire.

== Mill race ==
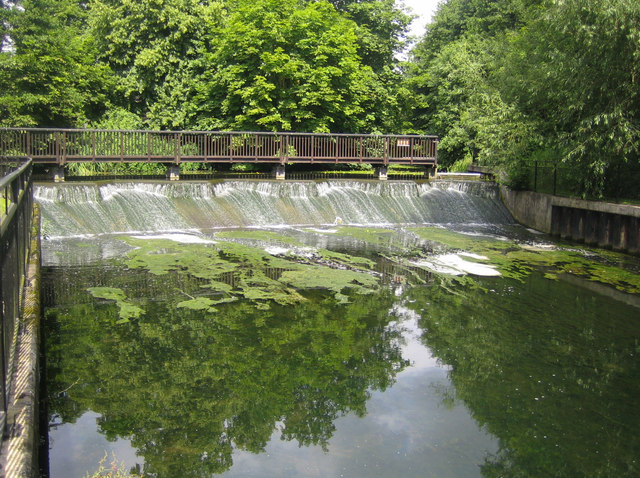
The weir at Sele Mill

Although water power is no longer used at the site, there is a 20th-century labyrinth weir on the River Beane designed to produce a head of water for the mill race.

The River Beane was defined as a heavily modified water body under the European Union's Water Framework Directive. There has been a programme of works to improve the ecology of the river, for example by reducing barriers at Woodhall Park. It has similarly been proposed to improve the river by modifying the weir at Sele Mill, which in its current state poses a barrier to fish migration.

== See also ==
- Horns Mill, Hertford
