= River Beane =

River in Hertfordshire, England

Coordinates: 51°47′N 0°05′W

Beane
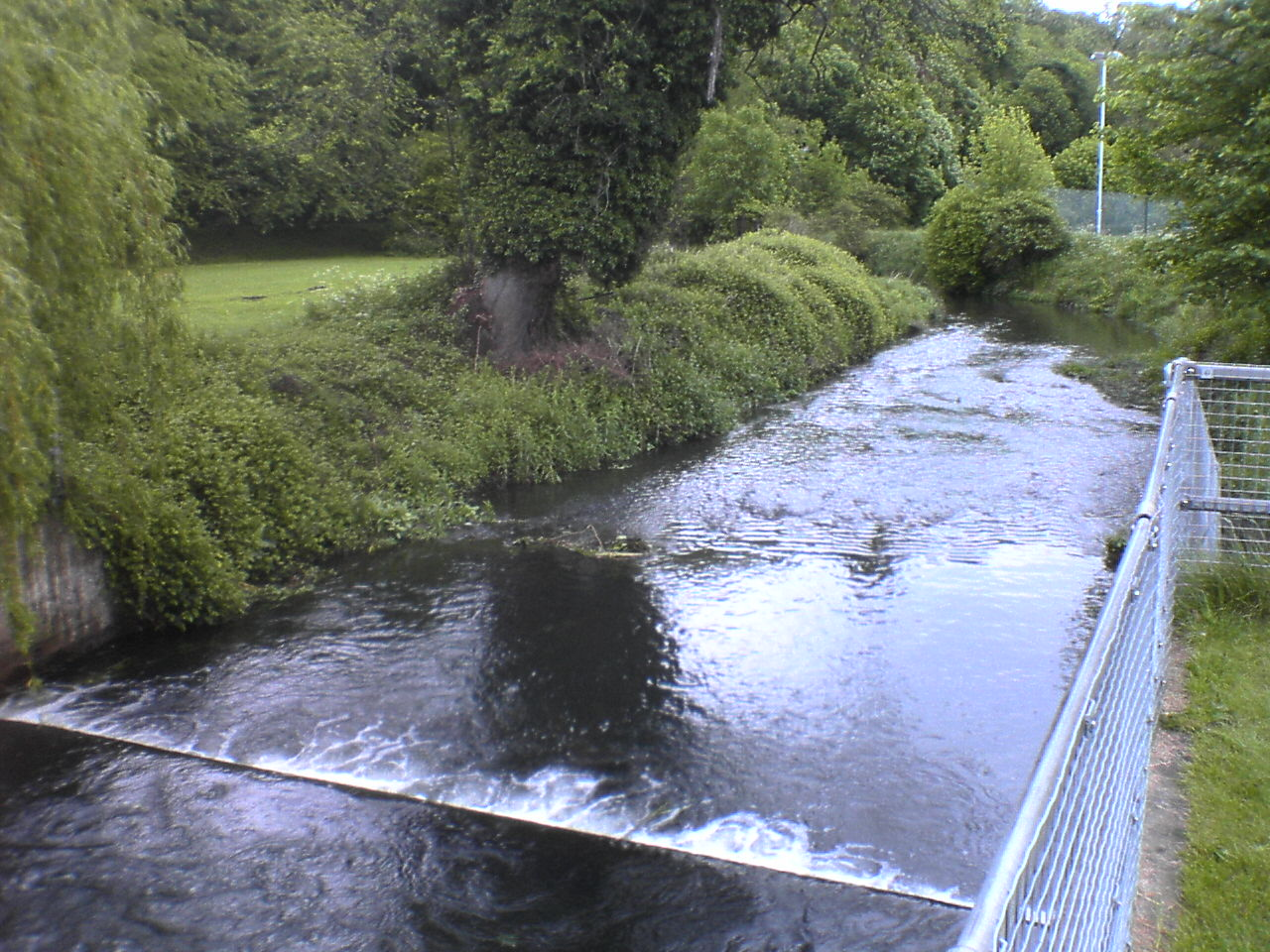
- Weir on the River Beane, Hartham Common

Location
- Country: United Kingdom

Physical characteristics
- Source
  - location: Nr. Sandon, Hertfordshire
  - elevation: 90 m (300 ft)
- Mouth
  - location: Hertford, Hertfordshire into River Lea
- Length: 17.8 km (11.1 mi)

The River Beane is chalk stream in the county of Hertfordshire, England. A tributary of the River Lea, it rises to the south-west of Sandon in the hills northeast of Stevenage and joins the Lea at Hartham Common in Hertford.

== History ==
In medieval times there were a number of watermills along the course of the Beane. A few of the buildings and mill races survive.

- Water power appears to have been used in the upper reaches of the Beane valley from an early date, as the place-name Walkern is believed to refer to a fulling mill. The current mill building at Walkern was rebuilt in the 19th century and is grade II listed. It has not been used for milling since the 1930s.
- Sele Mill, Hertford, is perhaps the site with the most historical interest. It was mentioned in the Domesday Book. However, its main claim to fame is that in the 15th century the facility was converted for use as a paper mill and was, as far as is known, the earliest paper mill in England. It is not clear when paper production began there, although 1488 has been suggested, but it was certainly underway in the 1490s. Paper from Sele Mill, supplied by John Tate, was used in publications from that decade, and the mill was visited by Henry VII in 1498 and 1499. Despite this sign of royal favour, paper production did not continue there for long, and appears to have ceased by the time the paper maker John Tate made his will in 1507.

== Hydrology ==
The Beane valley remains mainly rural in character. However, Hertfordshire's population increased substantially in the second half of the twentieth century, and the consequent demand for water has affected rivers such as the Beane and the Mimram. In the case of the Beane, a licence was given to abstract water near Aston for Stevenage's water supply. The river has since been adversely affected by over-exploitation of the chalk aquifer in its upper reaches.

The photo shows a dry section south of Walkern where from the 1990s until about 2014 there was only seasonal flow. An indication of the scale of the decline in flow is that the section at Walkern was once big enough to power a watermill and to support watercress beds.

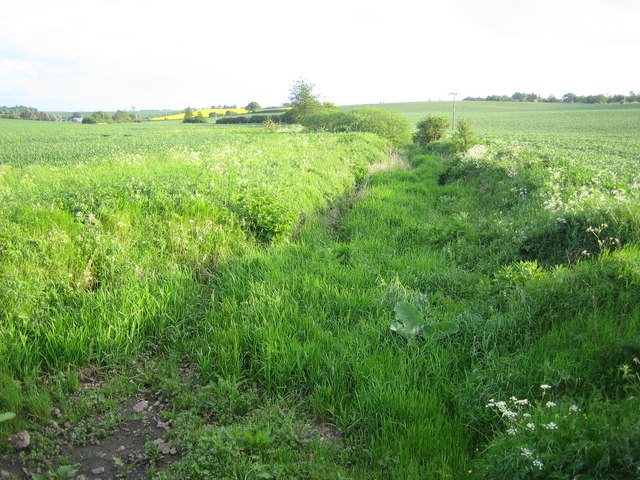
Dry bed of the Beane near Aston, Hertfordshire in 2006

The lower Beane is more robust and there has continued to be regular flow through Watton-at-Stone, Stapleford and Waterford until the confluence with the River Lea. However, overall the river has performed badly in assessments by the Environment Agency of flow level.

== Restoration ==
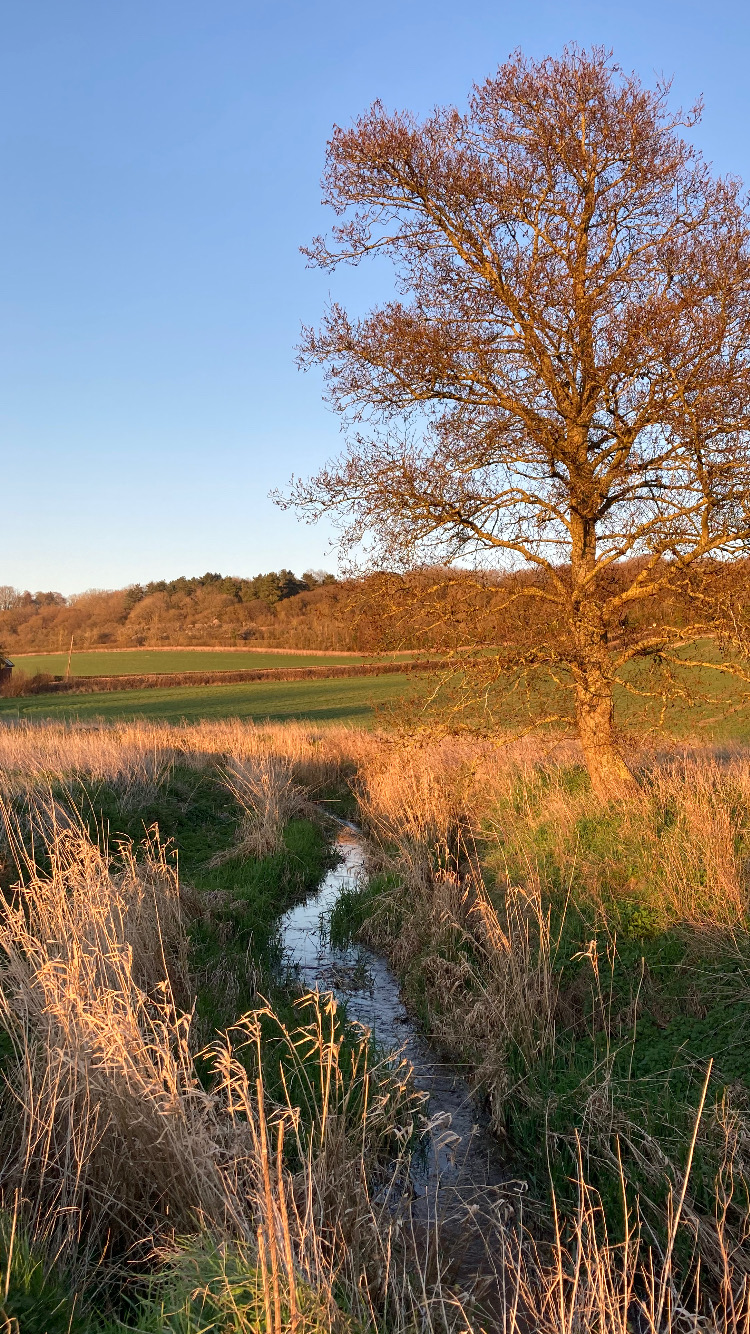
Upper Beane below Benington High Wood in March 2026

The state of the upper Beane resulted in calls for the river's restoration. The management plan for the river includes the objective that there is adequate flow along the length of the river to support a ‘good status’ chalk stream ecology (as defined by the European Union's Water Framework Directive).

One possible approach to the restoration of the upper Beane which was discussed was to use recycled water from sewage treatment works. For decades sewage from the Stevenage area has bypassed the river, being pumped down the Beane valley to Rye Meads near Hertford for treatment and eventual discharge into the River Stort. However, the water could theoretically have been discharged into the Beane if treated further upstream. In the event another option was chosen. Affinity Water was told to take less water from its pumping station near Aston, even though obtaining water from a less environmentally damaging source was difficult as the River Lea's catchment area as a whole is under pressure.

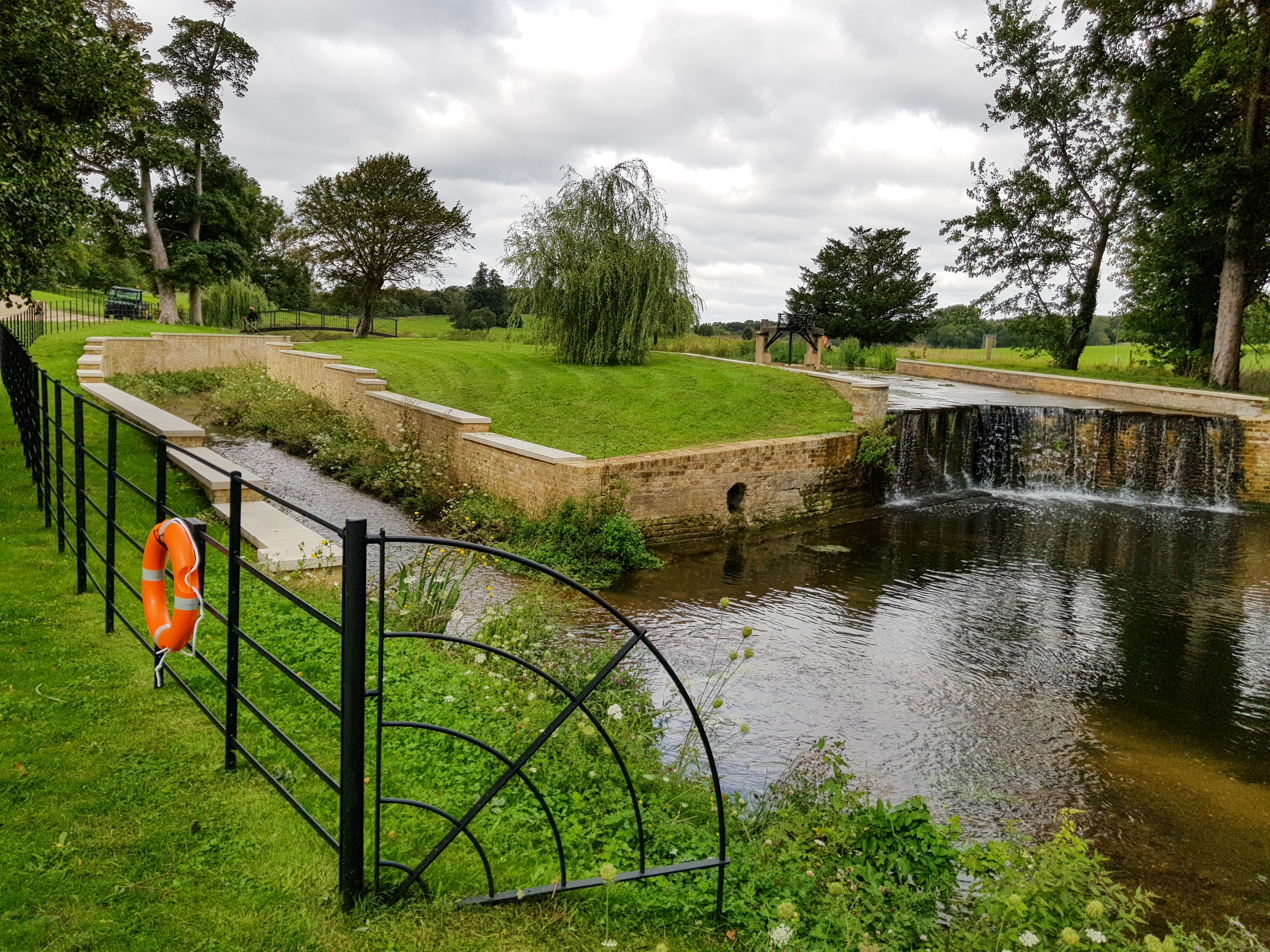
The cascade at Woodhall Park

There have been initiatives to improve the condition of lower stretches of the river, where there are issues regarding water quality and weirs. For example, where it passes through the Woodhall Park estate (near Watton) the river has been modified by an 18th-century landscaping project. This had the adverse consequence of impeding fish passage and a channel has now been constructed which by-passes the obstruction.

== Access ==
Herts and Middlesex Wildlife Trust (HMWT) has launched a circular trail at Waterford, which includes some scenic sections of the River Beane.
