= Hertford Castle =

Castle in Hertfordshire, England

- Part of Hertfordshire
- Hertford, England
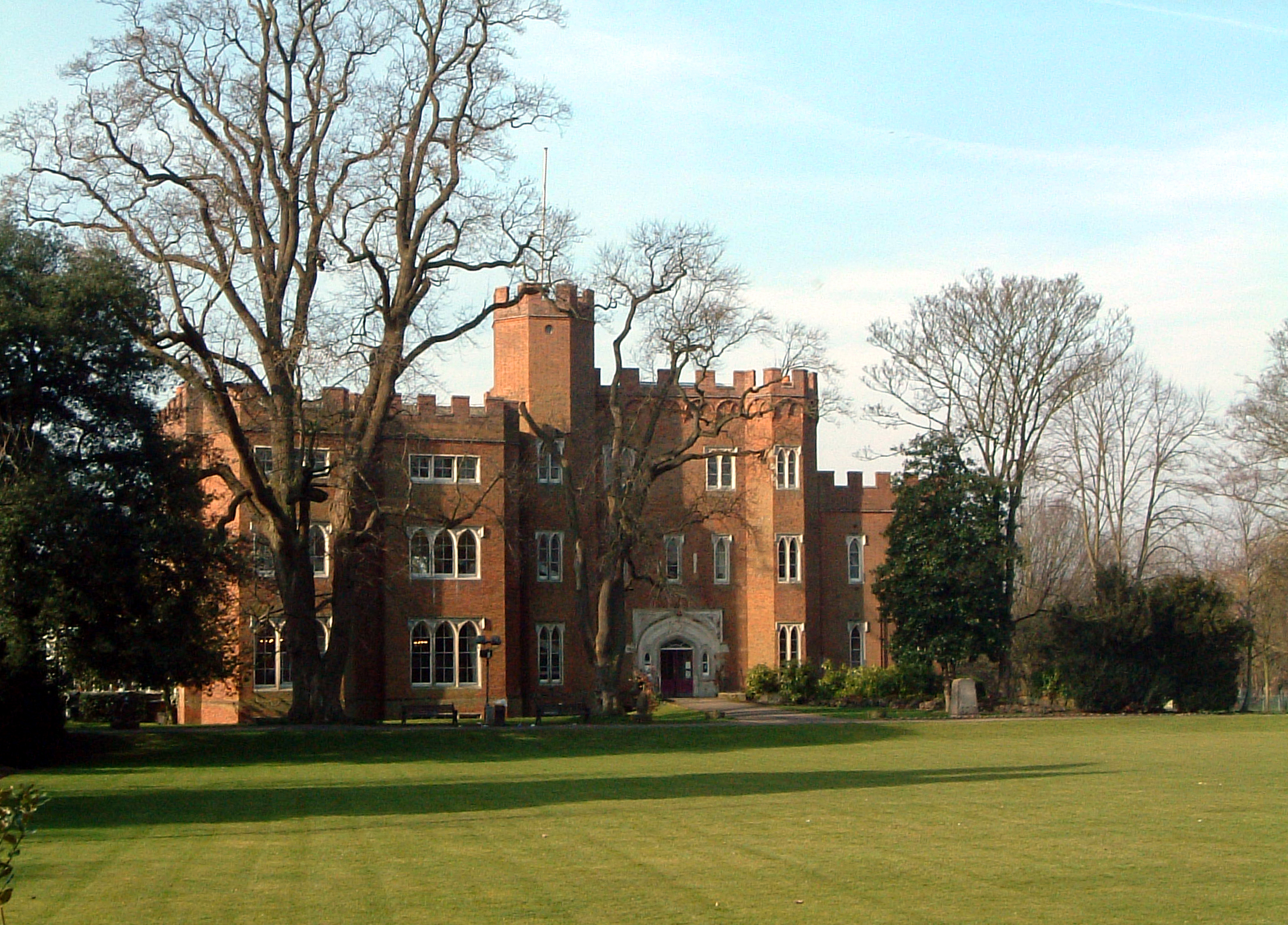
- The 16th to 18th-century façade of Hertford Castle Gatehouse.

Site information
- Owner: Hertford Town Council
- Open to the public: No
- Condition: Rebuilt

Location
- Coordinates: 51.7955°N 0.0800°W
- Height: Up to 15 metres (49 ft)

Site history
- Built: 913: Anglo-Saxon burgh 1066: Motte-and-bailey; 1170 - 1174: Rectangular castle 1540s: Royal Tudor Palace; 17th - 20th Century: Private residence
- Built by: Edward the Elder; William the Conqueror; Henry II; Henry VIII; William Cecil, 2nd Earl of Salisbury
- In use: Occupied

Hertford Castle is a Norman era castle built beside the River Lea in Hertford, the county town of Hertfordshire, England. Most of the internal buildings of the structure have been demolished.

The main surviving section is the Tudor gatehouse, which is a Grade I listed building. Parts of the bailey walls on the east side of the castle also still stand, and are a Grade II* listed building.

== History ==
=== Medieval history ===
Hertford Castle was built on a site first fortified by Edward the Elder around 913. By the time of the Norman Conquest in 1066, a motte and bailey were on the site surrounded by a moat. William the Conqueror granted the castle to Peter de Valognes, the High Sheriff of Essex and Hertfordshire.

Henry II took a great interest in the castle and its potential and it was practically reconstructed between 1170 and 1174. This included the building of the flint walls, drawbridges and gatehouses. The castle was further strengthened during the reign of Richard I by his regent, William Longchamp. By this time the castle was governed by the Crown after Robert de Valognes had died in 1184 leaving no male heirs. However it had been claimed by Robert Fitzwalter, Robert de Valoignes's son-in-law. He seized the castle and installed his own tenants and garrison. Although he was subsequently evicted by King John, he was eventually appointed governor of the castle.

Following the death of Angelo Salvo in 1216, a French invasion besieged the castle for a month until the governor, Walter de Godarvil, surrendered. However the country then supported Henry III and by 1217 the French had left. Following this the castle's military role became secondary to its use as a royal residence and in 1299 Edward I gave it to his second wife Margaret.

During the reign of Edward II the castle saw its first political prisoners, some of the Knights Templar, in 1309. Edward's wife Isabella of France and their son, Edward III both spent much time in the castle, and Isabella died in the castle in 1358.

During the Hundred Years' War the castle was used to detain prisoners of royal and noble rank. These included King David II of Scotland and, in 1359, King John II of France. The following year the castle was granted to Edward's third son, John of Gaunt who spent much time there, using it as his chief country home when not abroad on campaigns. The defences were repaired and strengthened again at this time. When John of Gaunt died in 1399, Richard II seized all the Lancastrian estates, including Hertford Castle, where he installed his new wife, the eight-year-old Princess Isabella of Valois.

The castle continued to remain in royal hands and in 1418 Henry V granted it to his new wife, Princess Katherine of France, and they spent much time there together. The castle was repaired around 1440, paid for by the demolition of 'the manor of Camelot', thought to be Camlet Moat in Enfield Chase. Henry's son Henry VI spent much of his infancy at the castle. In 1445 he married Margaret of Anjou and granted her the castle. However, as a result of the Wars of the Roses the crown went to Edward IV who granted the castle to his wife, Elizabeth Woodville. When Richard III became king, the castle was granted to one of his greatest supporters, the Duke of Buckingham.

=== Tudor times ===
Henry VII married Elizabeth of York in 1486 and the following year he conferred the castle to his wife. Henry himself spent little time at Hertford, but he is recorded as having made two visits to Sele Mill, a paper mill just outside the town, where he appears to have sourced a supply of paper. His son Henry VIII spent considerable sums turning the castle into a civilian palace, including building the gatehouse, which still stands. Subsequently, Edward VI granted the castle to Princess Mary. During her eventual reign, the castle was used to imprison Protestant martyrs. Elizabeth I was a frequent visitor to Hertford.

=== Modern history ===
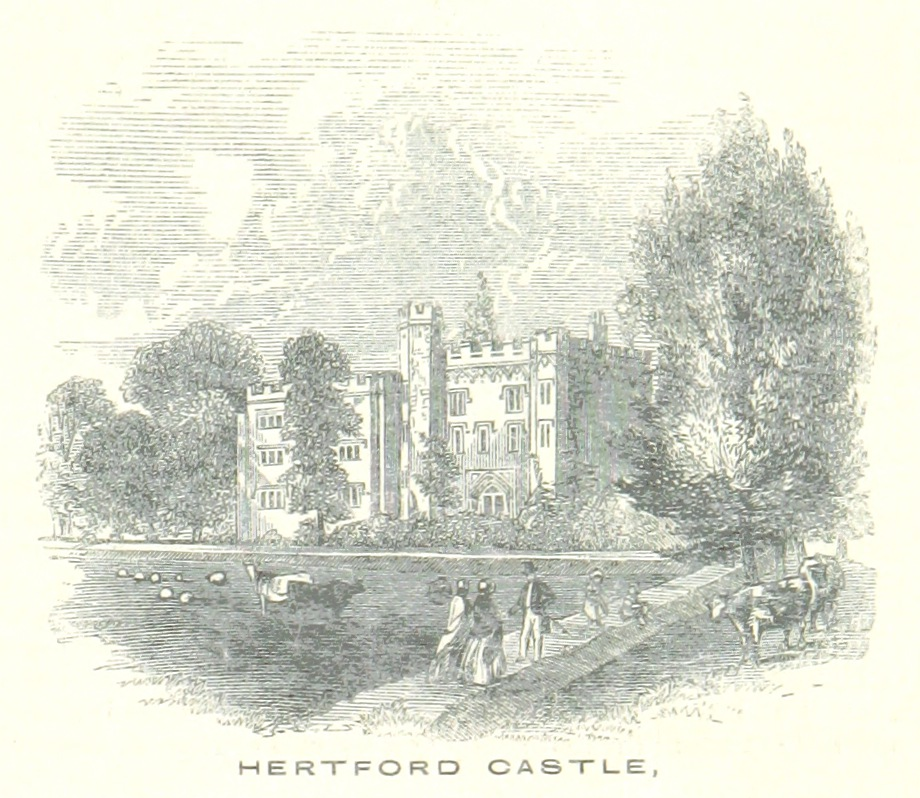
Hertford Castle pictured in 1851

From the reign of James I the castle ceased to be a royal residence and it fell into decay. After Charles I came to the throne, the castle was granted to William Cecil, 2nd Earl of Salisbury. Much of the castle was now in ruins, having not been used since Tudor times. The castle was leased to Sir William Harrington of Hertingfordbury Park, who carried out work to restore the buildings. He then assigned his lease to Sir William Cowper, Collector of Customs at the Port of London.

From this time the castle remained in the ownership of the Cecil family, who leased it out to a succession of occupiers, many of them successors to William Cowper. Around 1790 the south wing was added to the gatehouse. The windows of the existing gatehouse were all remodelled, and the parapet added with its brick battlements. Around 1800 a new gateway and lodge were built by the Marquess of Downshire.

Between 1805 and 1809, the castle became the home of the East India Company College, which trained young employees in Asian languages and other subjects prior to service overseas. The college moved to purpose-built accommodation at Haileybury.

In 1822, a general dispensary was established at the castle by the Rev. Thomas Lloyd, who was a prime mover in charitable work in the town.

In 1911, the Hertford Corporation leased the gatehouse of the castle (which was all that then remained) from the Marquess of Salisbury to house its administration. The grounds became a public garden. In the 1930s, the north wing was added to the gatehouse and, in the late 20th century, Lord Salisbury gave what was left of the castle to the town.

== See also ==
- Hertford Museum
