= Thomas Leverton =

English architect

Thomas Leverton (c.1743 – 23 September 1824) was an English architect.

== Life ==
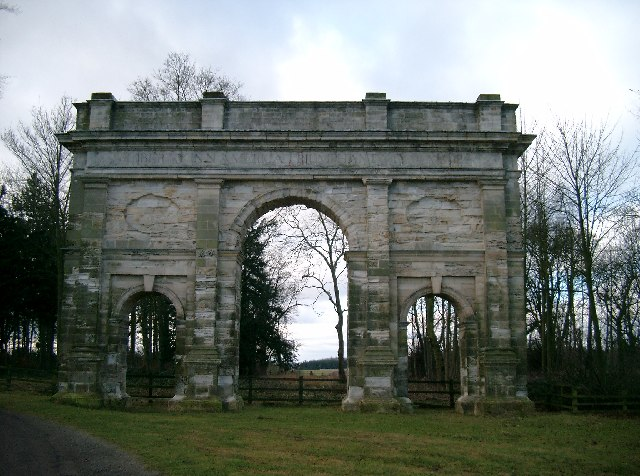
The Triumphal Arch at Parlington Hall.

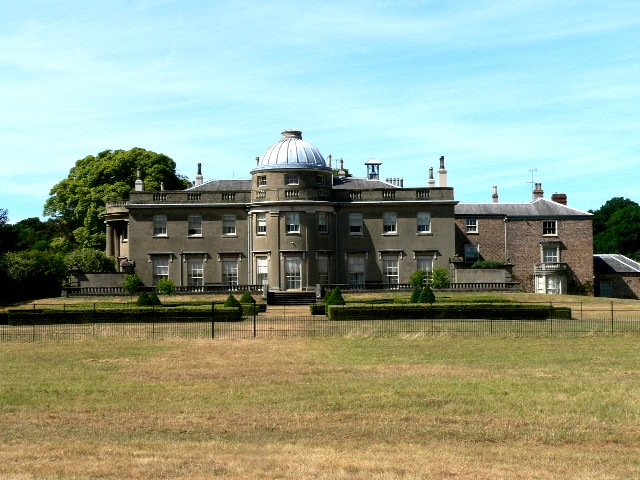
Scampston Hall, remodelled by Leverton.

He was born in Waltham Abbey, Essex, where he was baptised on 11 June 1743, the son of the builder Lancelot Leverton. Having learned his father's trade he acquired the skills of architecture with the help of patrons.

He built houses both in London and the countryside, including Watton Wood Hall (now Woodhall Park), Hertfordshire, built in 1777–82 for Sir Thomas Rumbold, which includes a hall decorated in the Etruscan style. In 1780 he designed Plaistow Lodge (now Quernmore School) for Peter Thellusson at Bromley, Kent in a style suggestive of Adams. His domed refit of Scampston Hall near Malton, Yorkshire (1803), reflected the work of Wyatt. Other houses by Leverton, now demolished, included Woodford Hall, Essex, built in 1775 for William Hunt, and Riddlesworth Hall, Norfolk, built in 1792 for Silvanus Bevan III. Error:(Riddlesworth Hall was not demolished and is the home of Riddlesworth Hall Preparatory School). Error - The Riddlesworth Hall designed by Leverton burnt down in 1899, the current Hall is indeed a school but the architect was H.J.Green

In the grounds of Parlington Hall, Yorkshire, he built a triumphal arch in commemoration of the American victory in the War of Independence for Sir Thomas Gascoigne. Leverton showed the design at the Royal Academy in 1781.

He has sometimes been credited with the design of Bedford Square in London: while this is uncertain some of the individual houses are attributed to him, and interiors, including those at No 13, where he lived from 1795. His chief skill lay in the innovatory design of small-scale interiors. Describing his work at Woodhall Park, Nikolaus Pevsner said that Leverton's interiors "have a style, decidedly their own, different from Adam's or Chambers's or Hollands's" their character coming out most clearly in the central staircase hallway, "profusely but very delicately decorated with plaster à la antique".

Leverton was surveyor to the Grocers' Company, for whom he built a new hall, completed in 1802. A brick building with stone facings (including a rusticated basement level and Tuscan pilasters), it was described in a contemporary account as "though not a splendid fabric ... well adapted to its enclosed situation." The foundations proved inadequate, and by 1814 cracks had developed in the building. He was also surveyor to the theatres royal in London and the Phoenix Fire Insurance Company, London, for which he built offices in Lombard Street in about 1787 and a fire engine house at Charing Cross, both later demolished.

He took over as architect at the Department of Land Revenue after the retirement of John Marquand. In this capacity he, along with his pupil, Thomas Chawner, submitted a plan for the improvement of the crown property of Marylebone Park Farm (now Regent's Park) in July 1811, although John Nash's plans were preferred.

Stephen Geary, founder and architect of Highgate Cemetery, was Leverton's pupil between 1811 and 1818.

He exhibited at the Royal Academy from 1777 until 1803.

He was a Justice of the Peace (JP) for Westminster, Middlesex, Surrey and Kent.

== Family ==
He was married twice, firstly in 1766 and then, in 1803, to Rebecca Craven of Blackheath, but his only son predeceased him. His niece married a pupil, James Donaldson, and was the mother of Thomas Leverton Donaldson, who became Professor of Architecture at London University.

== Death and legacy ==
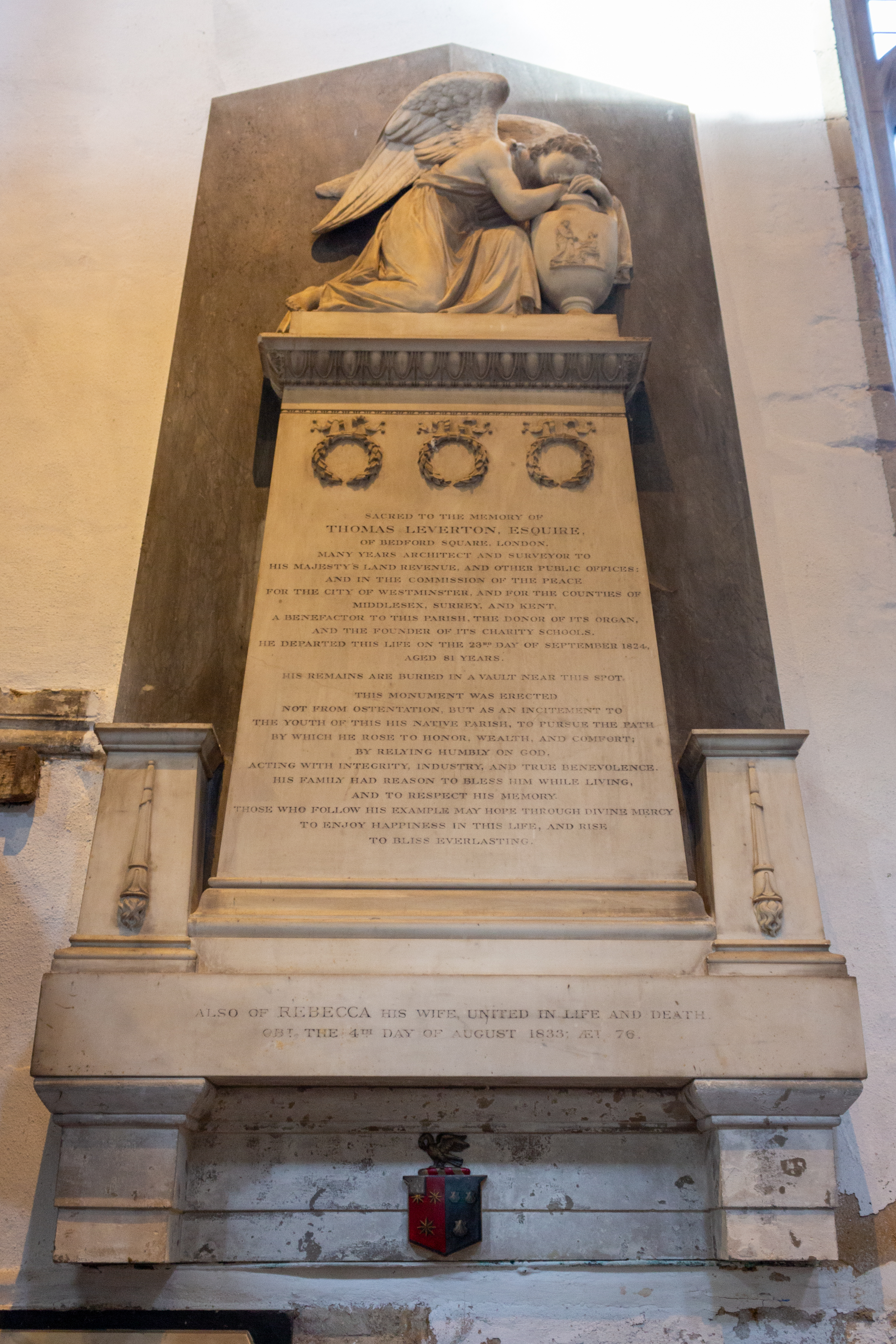
Memorial to Leverton in Waltham Abbey Church

Leverton died at 13 Bedford Square, London, on 23 September 1824. He was buried at Waltham Abbey. The monument was sculpted by Josephus Pinnix Kendrick.

The Thomas Leverton Charity, founded by money left in Leverton's will, is intended to aid deserving women in distress, preferably widows resident in the united parishes of St Giles and St George. It has since been amalgamated into the St Giles-in-the-Fields and Bloomsbury United Charity.

== Works ==
- Woodford Hall in Essex (built 1775 for William Hunt; demolished)
- Watton Wood Hall (now Woodhall Park), Hertfordshire, (built 1777–82 for Sir Thomas Rumbold).
- Triumphal Arch, Parlington Hall, Aberford, Yorkshire (built c.1781–3 for Thomas Gascoigne).
- Riddlesworth Hall in Norfolk (built 1792 for Sivanus Bevan).
- Grocers' Hall, City of London (1798–93; demolished).
- Scampston Hall, Yorkshire (remodelled in 1803 for William Thomas St Quintin).
- 4 Hamilton Place, Mayfair, London (1807-1810 GII)
- 5 Hamilton Place, Mayfair, London (1807-1810, GII*)
- Gordon House, Chelsea (built 1809 for Lieutenant Colonel J. Willoughby Gordon).
- Office for the Phoenix Fire Insurance Company, Lombard Street, London (demolished).
- Fire engine house at Charing Cross fire engine house at Charing Cross (demolished).
- And when he died his wife set up a school in Highbridge Street, with money that Thomas had left for 20 poor boys and 20 poor girls in the parish to attend a school.

== Sources ==
- Graves, Algernon (1905). The Royal Academy: A Complete Dictionary of Contributors from its Foundations in 1769 to 1904. Vol. 5. London: Henry Graves.
- Pevsner, Nikolaus (1953). Hertfordshire. Buildings of England. Harmondsworth: Penguin Books.
- Winters, W. (1885). Our Parish Records. Waltham Cross: W. Winters.
