= A119 road (England) =

Road in England

Coordinates: 51.80588°N 0.09484°W

A119

Location
- Country: United Kingdom
- Constituent country: England
- Primary destinations: Ware Hertford Watton-at-Stone Waterford

Road network
- Roads in the United Kingdom; Motorways; A and B road zones

The A119 road is an A road connecting Ware and Watton-at-Stone via Hertford.
