= Stevenage =

Town and borough in Hertfordshire, England

- Town and borough
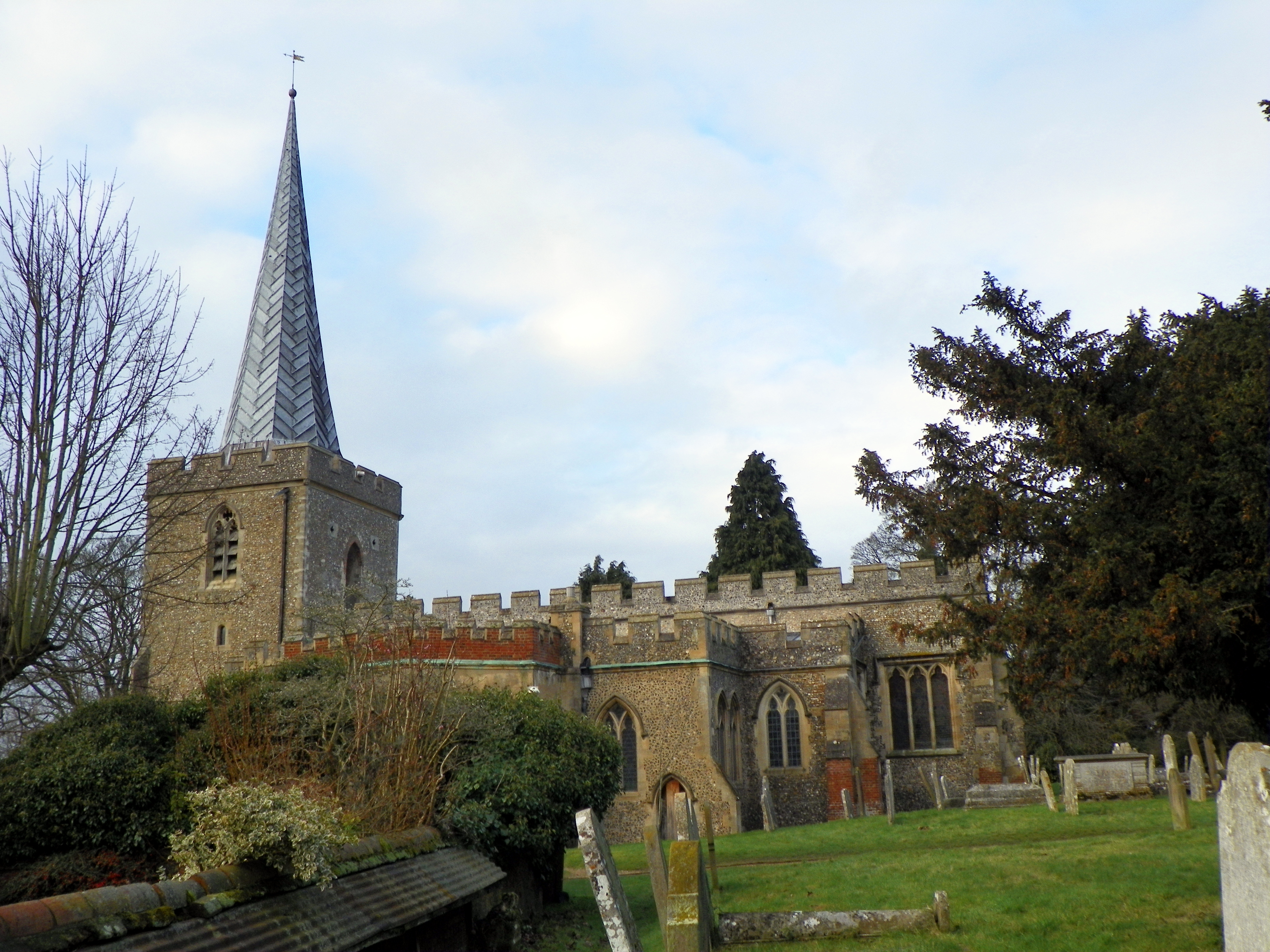
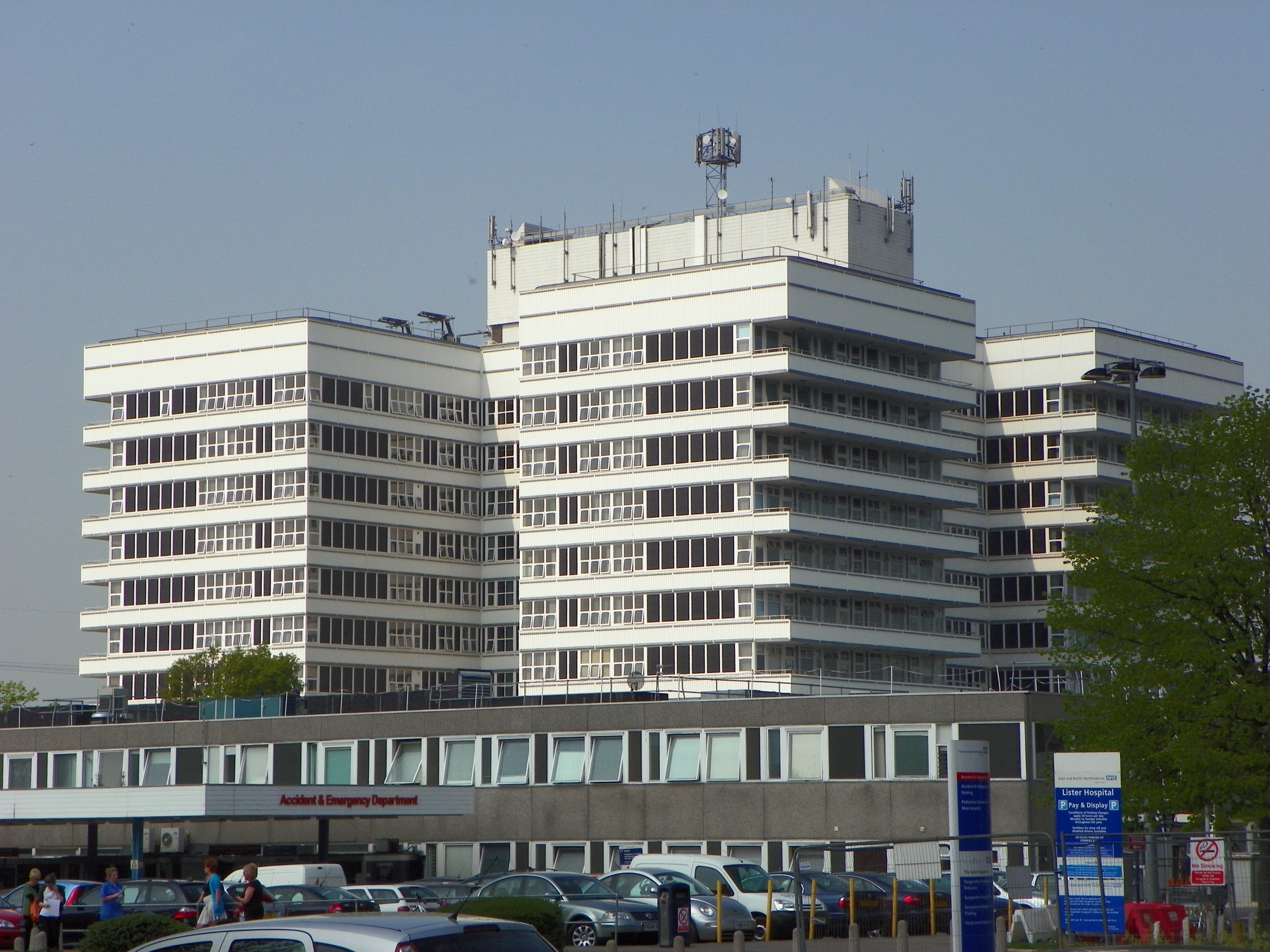
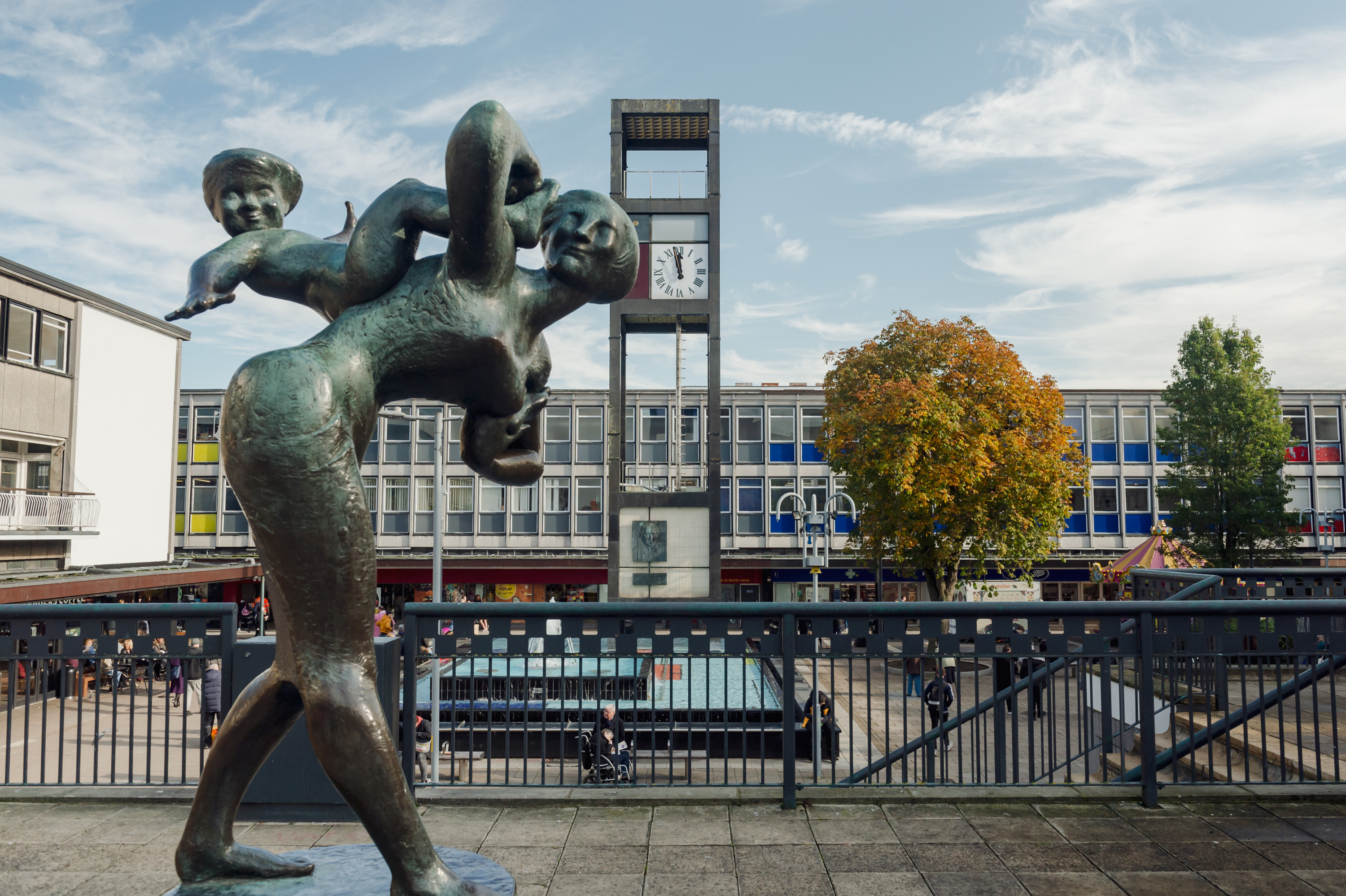
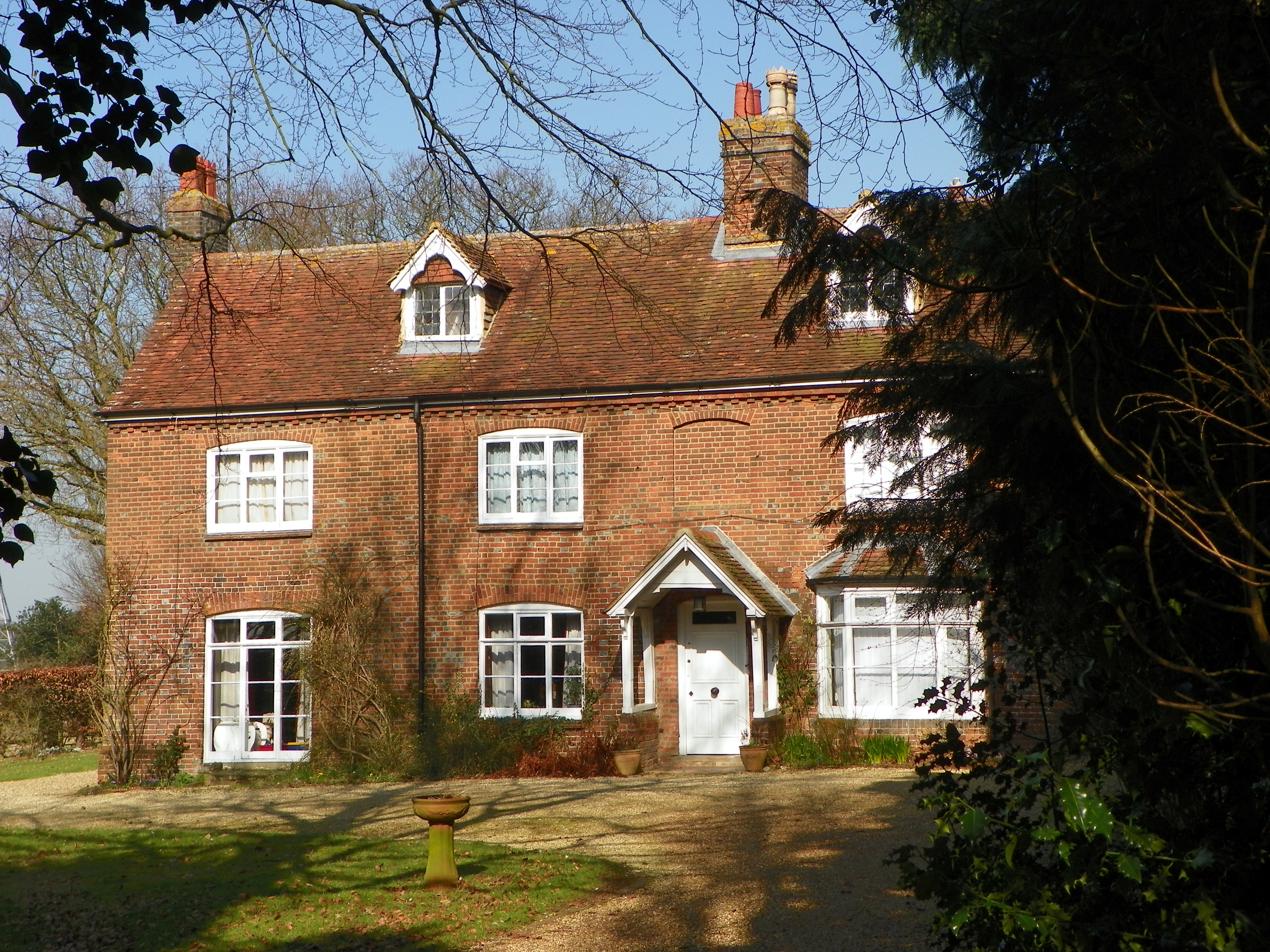
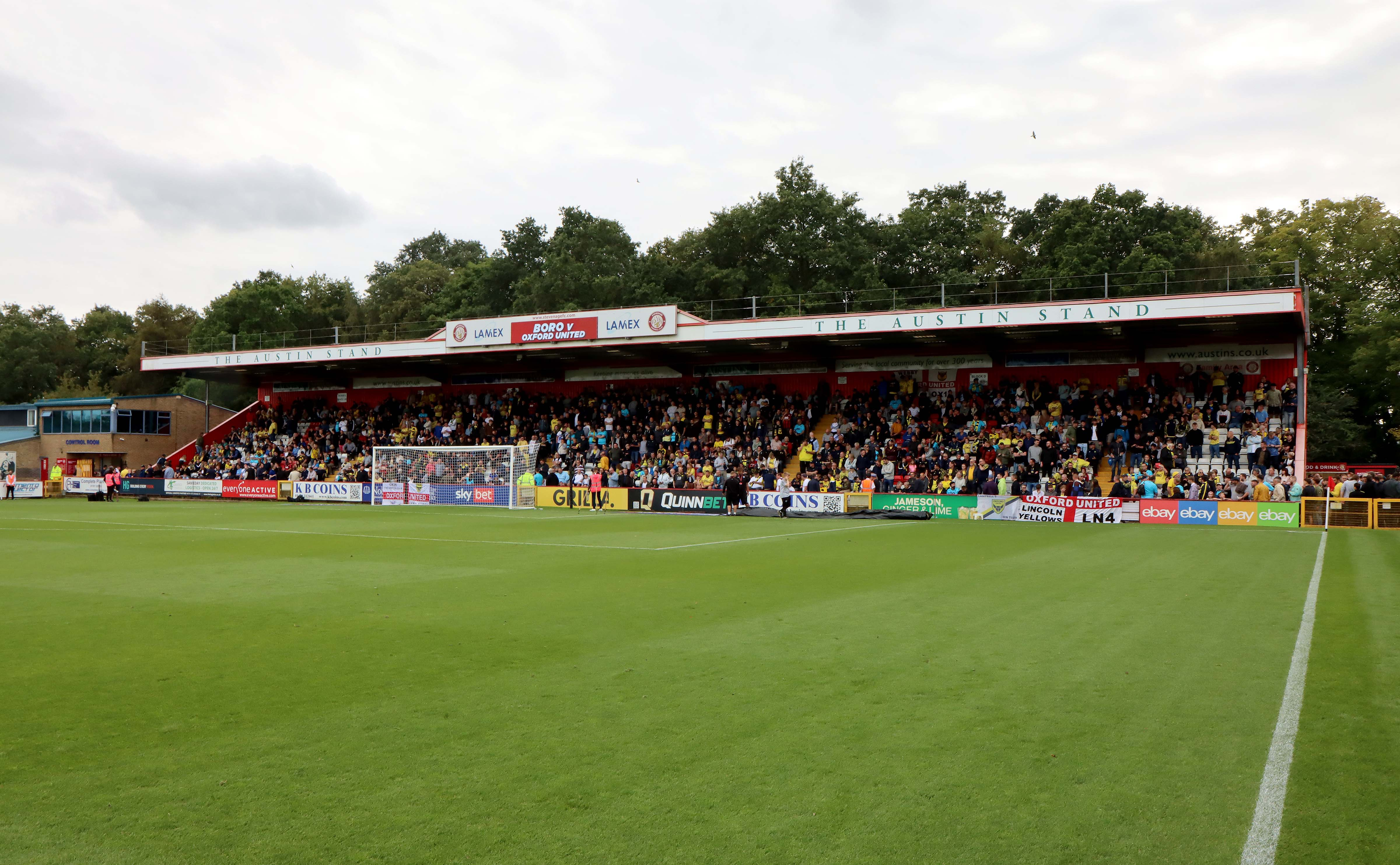
- St Nicholas Church Lister Hospital Joyride Statue & Clock Tower Rooks Nest House Broadhall Way
- Motto: "The heart of a town lies in its people"
- Stevenage shown within Hertfordshire
- Coordinates: 51°54′06″N 00°12′07″W
- Sovereign state: United Kingdom
- Constituent country: England
- Region: East of England
- Ceremonial county: Hertfordshire
- Admin HQ: Stevenage

Government
  - Type: Non-metropolitan district
  - Governing body: Stevenage Borough Council
  - Mayor: Lloyd Briscoe
  - Council control: Labour
  - MP: Kevin Bonavia (Labour)

Area
  - Total: 10.02 sq mi (25.96 km^{2})

Population (2025)
  - Total: 92,081 (Ranked 264th)
  - Density: 7,980/sq mi (3,081/km^{2})

Ethnicity (2021)
  - Ethnic groups: List: 82.8% White; 7.5% Asian; 4.8% Black; 3.6% Mixed; 1.3% other

Religion (2021)
  - Religion: List: 44.9% no religion; 43.3% Christianity; 8.6% other; 3.2% Islam
- Time zone: UTC+0 (Greenwich Mean Time)
- Postcode areas: SG1, SG2
- Area code: 01438
- ONS code: 26UH (ONS); E07000243 (GSS)
- OS grid reference: TL2424
- Police: Hertfordshire
- Fire: Hertfordshire
- Ambulance: East of England
- Website: stevenage.gov.uk

Stevenage (/ˈstiːvənɪdʒ/ STEE-vən-ij) is a town and borough in Hertfordshire, England, 28 miles (45 km) north of London. Stevenage is east of junctions 7 and 8 of the A1(M), between Letchworth Garden City to the north and Welwyn Garden City to the south. In 1946, Stevenage was designated the United Kingdom's first New Town under the New Towns Act. In 2021 it had a population of 94,456.

== Toponymy ==
"Stevenage" may derive from Old English stiþen āc / stiðen āc / stithen ac (various Old English dialects cited here) meaning "(place at) the stiff oak".

The name was recorded as Stithenæce in c. 1060 and as Stigenace in the Domesday Book in 1086.

== History ==
=== Pre-Conquest ===
Stevenage lies near the line of the Roman road from Verulamium to Baldock. Some Romano-British remains were discovered during the building of the New Town, and a hoard of 2,000 silver Roman coins was discovered during housebuilding in the Chells Manor area in 1986. Other artefacts included a dodecahedron toy, fragments of amphorae for imported wine, bone hairpins, and samian ware pottery associated with high-status families. Archeological excavations have confirmed the existence of a small Roman farmstead, a malting kiln and a Celtic round house in the Chells area, and a cemetery containing 25 cremations. The most substantial evidence of activity from Roman times is Six Hills, six tumuli by the side of the old Great North Road that are presumably the burial places of members of a local family.

The first Saxon camp, a little to the east of the Roman sites, was in a clearing in the woods where the church, the manor house and the first village were later built. Settlements also sprang up in Chells, Broadwater and Shephall. Before the New Town was established, Shephall was a separate parish, and Broadwater was split between the parishes of Shephall and Knebworth.

During the 9th and 10th centuries AD, the Saxon village in Stevenage faced frequent attacks from Viking raiders. Stevenage was on the border of the Danelaw. A Viking spearhead was discovered by archaeologists at nearby Ardeley.

=== Middle Ages ===
According to the Domesday Book, in 1086 the Lord of the manor was the Abbot of Westminster Abbey. The settlement had moved down to the Great North Road. In 1281 it was granted a Royal Charter to hold a weekly market and annual fair, still held in the High Street.

The earliest part of St Nicholas's Church dates from the 12th century, but it was probably a site of worship much earlier. The list of rectors (parish priests) is relatively complete from 1213. Around 1500 the church was much improved, with decorative woodwork and the addition of a clerestory.

North of the Old Town is Jack's Hill, associated with the legendary archer Jack O'Legs of Weston. According to local folklore, Jack stole flour from the bakers of Baldock to feed the poor during a famine, like Robin Hood.

The remains of a medieval moated homestead in Whomerley Wood comprise an 80-yard-square trench almost five feet wide in parts. It was probably the home of Ralph de Homle. Pieces of Roman and later pottery have been found there.

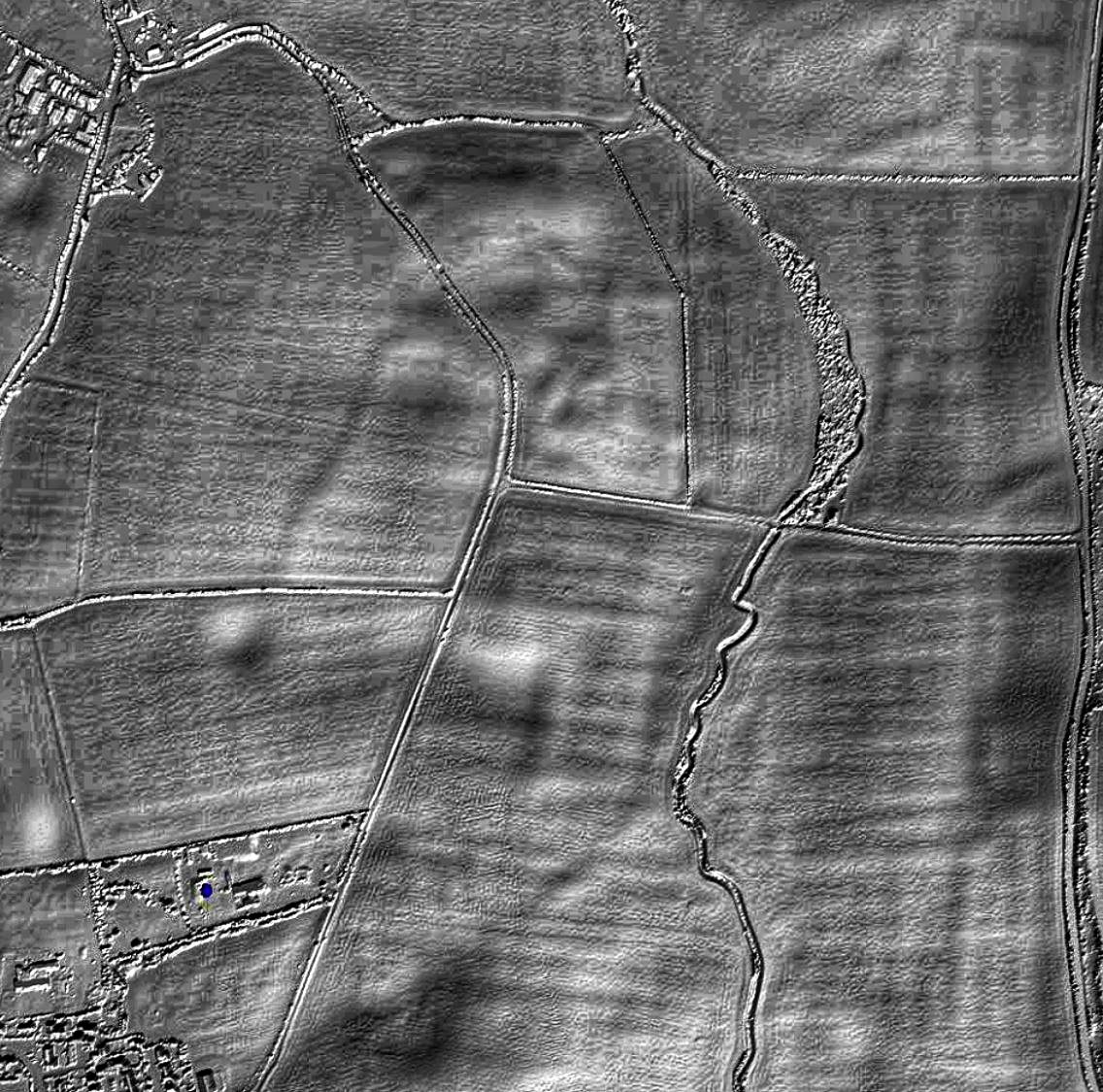
A lidar view of extensive, as yet unidentified, archaeological features on the eastern side of Stevenage in Aston.

The oldest surviving house in Stevenage is Tudor House in Letchmore Street, built before 1500. During the 16th century it was a butcher's shop owned by a man named Scott. From 1773 onwards it served as the town's workhouse, and later became a school from 1835 until 1885. It was the headquarters of the local town gas company from c.1885 until 1936, when it was converted into a private dwelling.

Chells Manor, a medieval hall house located three miles from the Old Town, was built in the 14th century for the Wake family on the foundations of a much older moated manor house mentioned in the Domesday Book. The site of the lost village of Chells was redeveloped during the extension of the New Town in the 1980s, and a hoard of Roman coins was discovered. In the present day, Chells is a suburb of New Stevenage.

England's earliest known papermill was established in Stevenage around 1488 by John Tate. In 1496, Tate acquired a second mill in Hertford on the site of the modern Sele Mill. Tate's papermill supplied rag paper to the household of King Henry VII of England and to William Caxton for his printed edition of Chaucer's Canterbury Tales. The Stevenage papermill was converted from an existing watermill and operated until 1507.

=== Tudor, Stuart and Georgian eras ===
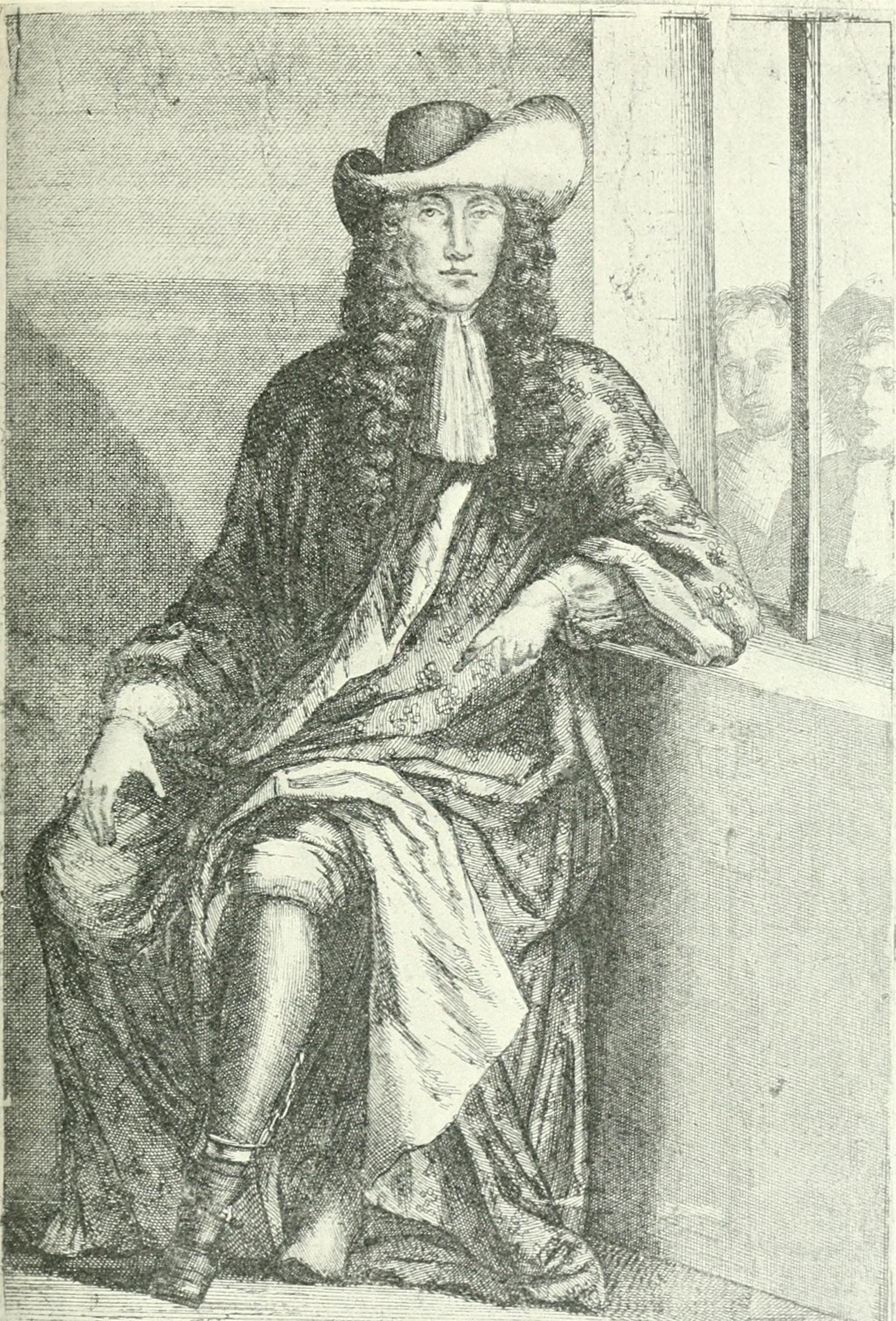
James Whitney, the dandy highwayman.

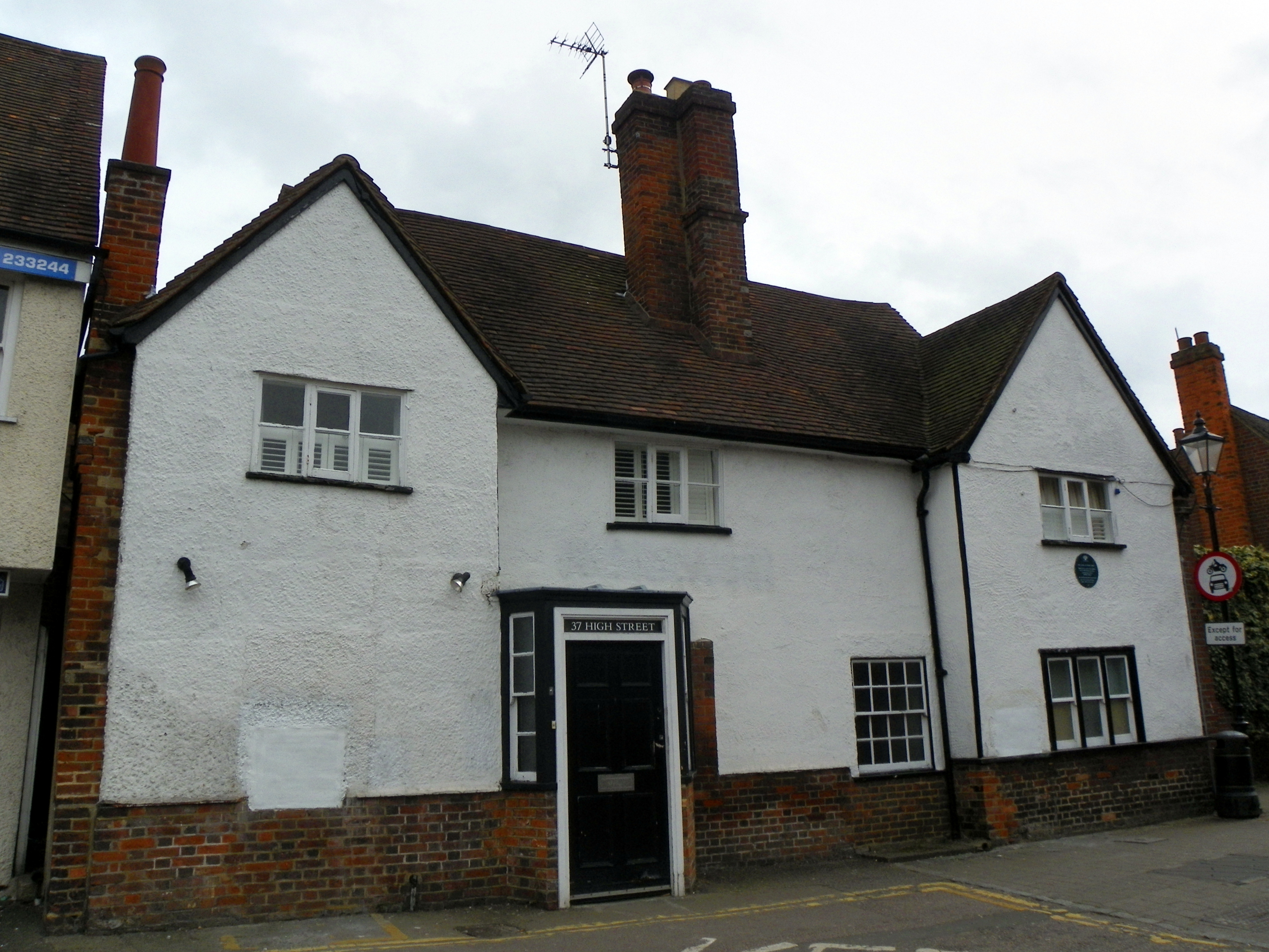
Henry Trigg's house, 37 High Street, 2016

In 1558 Thomas Alleyne, then the Rector of Stevenage, founded a free grammar school for boys, Alleyne's Grammar School, which, despite becoming a boys' comprehensive school in 1967 (starting with the 1969 year), had an unbroken existence (unlike the grammar school in neighbouring Hitchin) until 1989, when it was merged with Stevenage Girls' School to become the Thomas Alleyne School. Francis Cammaerts was Headmaster of Alleyne's Grammar School from 1952 to 1961. The school, which has been since 1989 a mixed comprehensive school and is now an academy as of 2013, still exists on its original site at the north end of the High Street. It was intended to move the school to Great Ashby, but the Coalition government (2010–15) scrapped the move owing to budget cuts.

The grade II listed Cromwell Hotel is a 16th-century Jacobean farmhouse once owned by Oliver Cromwell's spymaster John Thurloe. It was confiscated during the Stuart Restoration of 1660 and became a hotel in 1925. The hangman Albert Pierrepoint frequently stayed here when travelling to London for an execution.

During the 17th century, the Elizabethan house at 37 High Street was the home of greengrocer and churchwarden Henry Trigg. Trigg was a philanthropist who donated another of his properties to serve as Stevenage's first workhouse. When Henry died in 1724 his coffin was placed in the rafters of the adjoining barn to prevent resurrection men from stealing his remains. In 1774, Trigg's house became the Old Castle coaching inn, and was used as a staging post by the Royal Mail. From 1999 until 2016 it served as a branch of NatWest, and as of 2022 it has been converted into a dentist's surgery.

Stevenage's prosperity came in part from the Great North Road, which became a turnpike in the early 18th century, with a toll point on the site of the present day Marquess of Granby pub. Many inns in the High Street served the stagecoaches, 21 of which passed through Stevenage each day in 1800. During the 17th and 18th centuries, the road now known as Six Hills Way was the haunt of highwaymen who would use the ancient burial mounds as a hiding place. James Whitney, the namesake of the Highwayman pub in Graveley, was hanged at Newgate in 1693 for robbing travellers in this area. Whitney, a Jacobite, was born in Stevenage c.1660 and was apprenticed to a butcher in Hitchin before opening an inn in Cheshunt. Due to the failure of his business, Whitney began robbing wealthy travellers and by 1690 he had a gang of over 50 men.

In the early 1800s, the almshouse at Dog and Bitch Yard was one of the first places in England where poor children were vaccinated for smallpox, just 20 years after Edward Jenner's discovery.

On 10 July 1807, the Great Fire of Stevenage destroyed 42 properties in Middle Row, including Hellard's almshouse of 1501. The fire is believed to have been started when a young girl employed as a chambermaid at one of the coaching inns emptied embers from the fireplace into the street. Sparks from the embers ignited the thatched roof of a nearby wheelwright's shop, and quickly engulfed the other timber framed buildings in the north end of the Old Town due to a strong North wind. The conflagration was only stopped from engulfing the entire street by demolishing a house to serve as a firebreak. After the fire was extinguished by Stevenage's volunteer firefighters using a hand-operated fire engine made in 1763, the houses and inns were rebuilt with brick facades and tiled roofs. Troopers from the Hertfordshire Yeomanry assisted the firefighters in the operation.

=== Victorian era to 20th century ===
The Fox Brothers in the early 20th century

In 1850 the Great Northern Railway was constructed and the era of the stagecoach ended. Stevenage grew only slowly throughout the 19th century and a second church (Holy Trinity) was constructed at the south end of the High Street. In 1861 Charles Dickens commented, "The village street was like most other village streets: wide for its height, silent for its size, and drowsy in the dullest degree. The quietest little dwellings with the largest of window-shutters to shut up nothing as if it were the Mint or the Bank of England."

At the turn of the century, the twin poachers Albert and Ebenezer Fox were active in the area. While in jail, they were studied by police commissioner Edward Henry to confirm his theory on the usefulness of fingerprinting in forensic science.

During the 1920s, Frank Dymoke (1893–1972) played for Stevenage FC. Frank was a sergeant in the Bedfordshire Regiment during World War I and witnessed the Christmas truce of 1914.

In 1928, Philip Vincent bought the HRD Motorcycle Co Ltd out of receivership, immediately moving it to Stevenage and renaming it the Vincent HRD Motorcycle Co Ltd. He produced the legendary motorcycles, including the Black Shadow and Black Lightning, in the town until 1955.

== Stevenage New Town ==
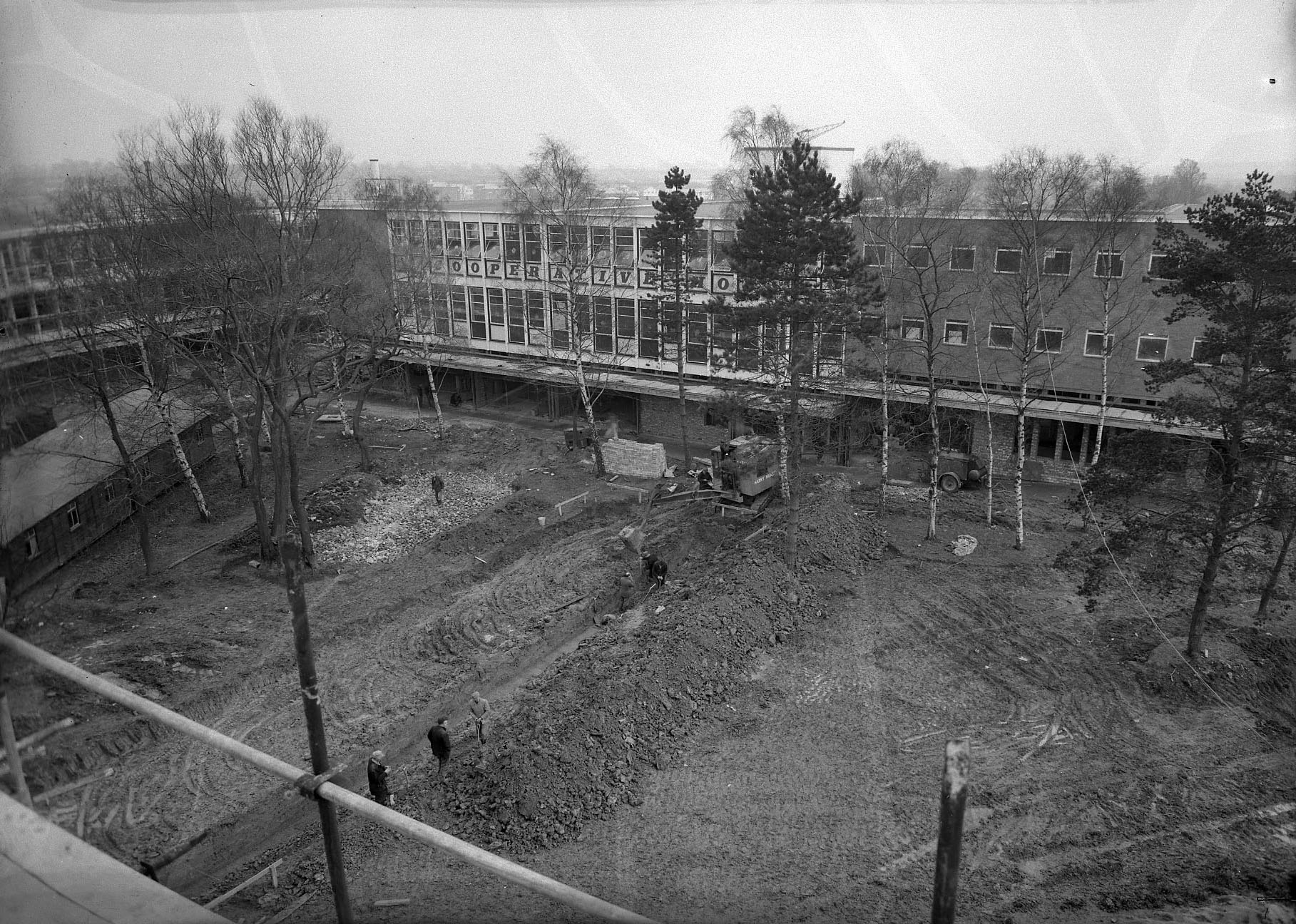
Stevenage Town Square under development in 1959

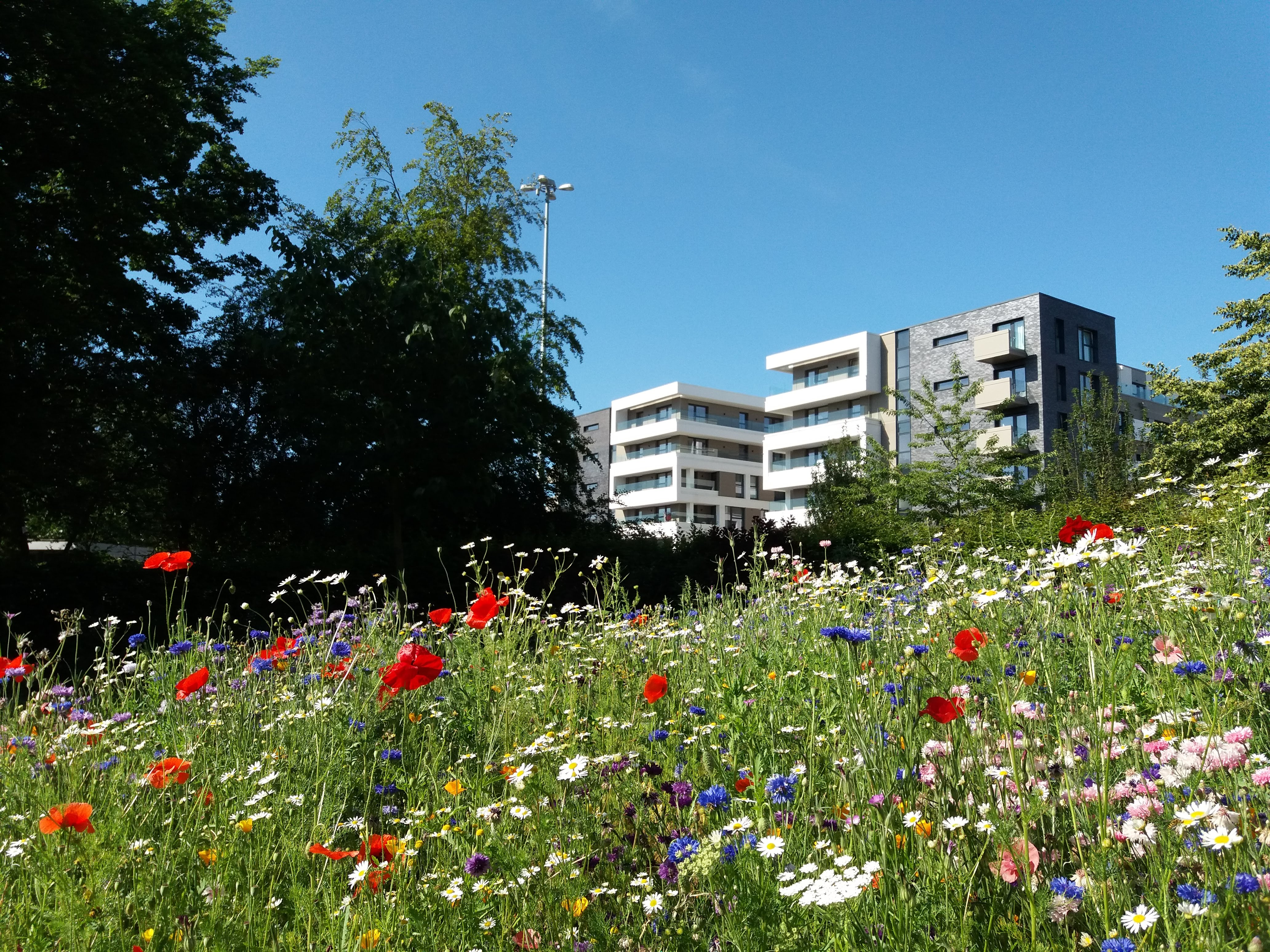
Park Place from Stevenage Town Centre Gardens, 2019

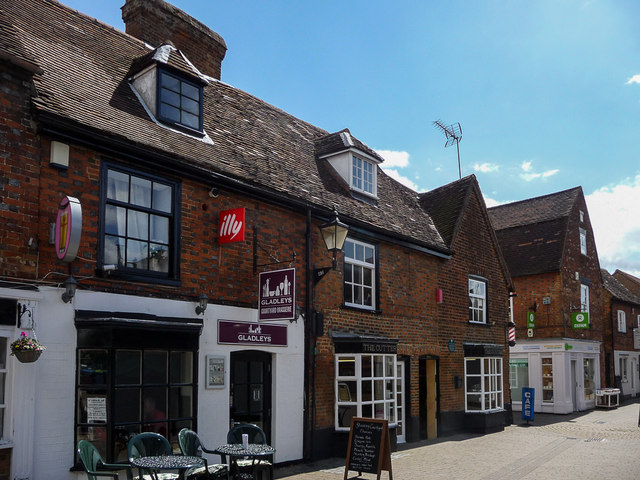
Middle Row, Stevenage Old Town, 2019

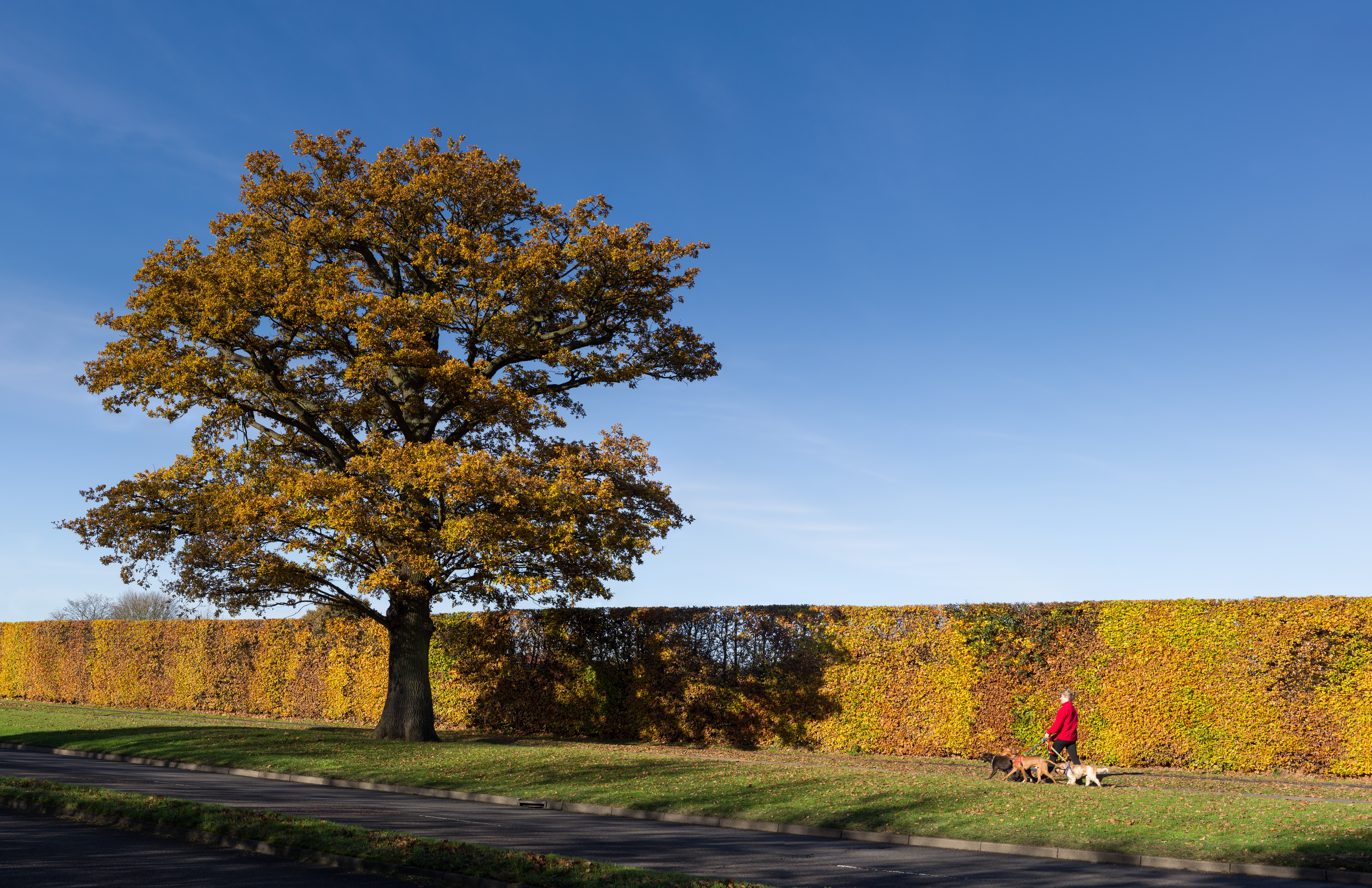
Autumn Oak - Broadhall Way, Stevenage, 2012

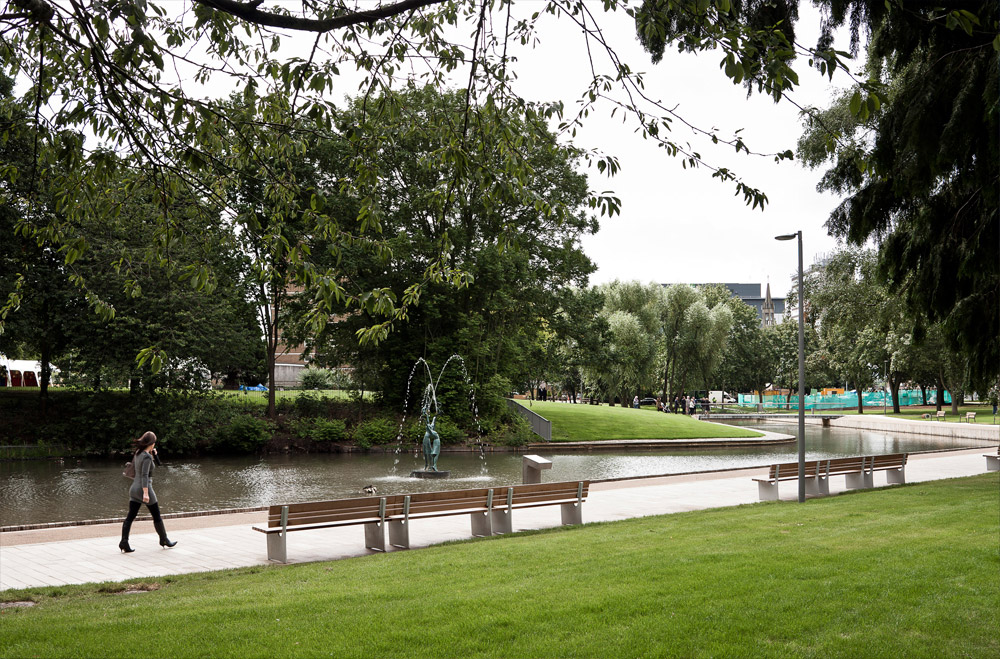
Stevenage Town Centre Gardens, 2019

Slow growth in Stevenage continued until just after World War II, when the Abercrombie Plan called for the establishment of a ring of new towns around London. On 1 August 1946, Stevenage was designated as the first New Town, under the New Towns Act.

The plan was not popular and local people protested at a meeting held in the town hall before Lewis Silkin, minister in the Labour Government of Clement Attlee. As Lewis Silkin arrived at the railway station for this meeting, some local people had changed the station signs from "Stevenage" to "Silkingrad". Silkin was obstinate at the meeting, telling a crowd of 3,000 people outside the town hall (around half the town's residents): "It's no good your jeering, it's going to be done." Despite the hostile reaction to Silkin and a referendum that showed 52% (turnout 2,500) "entirely against" the expansion, the plan went ahead.

The inaugural chairman of the Stevenage Development Corporation was the architect Clough Williams-Ellis, appointed by Lewis Silkin in 1946, with the radical town planner Dr Monica Felton as his deputy. In 1949, she became chairman but was sacked within two years. There were a number of reasons for her dismissal by the government but a lack of hands-on town planning leadership, and her opposition to the Korean War (for which she was later awarded the Lenin Peace Prize), sullied her reputation. Felton was replaced first by Allan Duff and later Thomas Bennett, who carried the project to completion. Gordon Stephenson was the planner, Peter Shepheard the architect, and Eric Claxton the engineer. Claxton took the attitude that the new town should separate bicycles from the automobile as much as possible. Mary Tabor was the Housing Director of Stevenage New Town from 1951 until 1972. Tabor was a member of the Society of Women Housing Managers, which was founded by women trained under Octavia Hill. Mary Tabor, with the support of more than 40 housing management staff by 1960, provided a notably personal and caring service to tenants of the town. Many early residents of the town would recall with gratitude how much she had done for them and the town as a whole.

In May 1953, Sir Roydon Dash took over the chairmanship from Bennett. In 1962, Sir Arthur Rucker was appointed Chairman of the Stevenage Development Corporation, retiring from the position in 1966. He was succeeded by Evelyn Denington, who joined the board in 1950. Denington remained the chairman until the dissolution of the Corporation in 1980. Having become a Dame Commander of the Order of the British Empire in 1974, Denington was elevated to the peerage in 1978, choosing to assume the title of Baroness Denington of Stevenage.

In keeping with the sociological outlook of the day, the town was planned with six self-contained neighbourhoods, each to house between ten and twelve thousand people. The first two estates to be occupied were the Stoney Hall and Monks Wood estates, in 1951. The Twin Foxes pub, on the Monks Wood estate, was Stevenage's first new public house and was named after local notorious identical-twin poachers (Albert and Ebenezer Fox). It closed in 2017. At least two other public houses have a direct relationship to local history. The Edward the Confessor pub (closed 2006) could have had a connection to St Mary's Church in nearby Walkern as King Edward reigned from 1042 until his death in 1066 and Walkern's church dates from this period. The second pub with a link to local history is the Our Mutual Friend in Broadwater. The name of the pub is the title of a novel by Charles Dickens. Dickens was an occasional guest of Sir Edward Bulwer-Lytton in nearby Knebworth House and knew Stevenage very well.

Next to be built and occupied were the neighbourhoods of Bedwell in 1952, and then came Broadwater and Shephall (1953), Chells in the 1960s and later Pin Green and Symonds Green. Another new development to the north of the town is Great Ashby. As of 2014 it was still under construction. The Government gave almost £2 million for a purpose-built homeless shelter, which will serve a large part of Hertfordshire.

=== Industrial area ===
Stevenage Development Corporation zoned an area for industry between the East Coast railway line and the A1 road, which came to be known as Gunnels Wood Industrial Area. An additional area for industry has since been developed at Pin Green.

The primary industrial area is in a location that is separate—but adjacent to—the residential areas of town. British Aerospace (now MBDA) was the largest employer in this area, but it has now been replaced by GSK. The firm occupies a large complex, hosting one of GSK's two global R&D hubs.

Airbus Defence and Space (previously British Aerospace) is located in a smaller industrial park. This is the same area that both Matra Marconi Space and Astrium, a prime contractor and equipment supplier of spacecraft, previously occupied. The site is used to assemble a number of spacecraft and rovers including Rosalind Franklin and the Solar Orbiter, and conduct analysis on others such as the Mars Earth Return Orbiter.

There are also small- to medium-sized firms such as Stevenage BioScience Catalyst (SBC), a new science park aimed at attracting small and start-up life-sciences enterprises, opened in 2011 on a site next to GSK.

=== Stevenage town centre ===
The pedestrianised town centre was the first purpose-built traffic-free shopping zone in Britain, taking its inspiration from the Lijnbaan in Rotterdam, and was officially opened in 1959 by the Queen. A landmark in the town centre is the clock tower and ornamental pool. Nearby is Joyride, a mother and child sculpture by Franta Belsky.

Next to the Town Garden, the Church of St Andrew and St George is an example of modern church design and has housed Stevenage Museum in its crypt since 1976. The church is a Grade II listed building. It is also the largest parish church to have been built in England since World War Two. Queen Elizabeth the Queen Mother laid the foundation stone in July 1956 and was also present at the consecration of the Bishop of St Alban's, the Right Reverend Michael Gresford-Jones, on Advent Sunday 27 November 1960. The frame is constructed from a continuous pour of concrete into moulds, creating interlacing arches and leaving no apparent joints. There are twelve Purbeck-marble columns around the high altar and the external walls are clad in panels faced with Normandy pebble. The campanile houses the loudspeakers for an electro-acoustic carillon. A popular sculpture, 'The Urban Elephant' by Andrew Burton, was commissioned in 1992.

Although revolutionary for its time, the town centre began showing signs of age and, in 2005, plans were revealed for a major regeneration to take place over the next decade. Details are still being debated by the council, landowners and other interested parties. The multimillion-pound plan to redevelop Stevenage town centre was scrapped owing to the 2008 financial crisis and the lack of interest from private-sector partners. On 24 May 2012, Stevenage Borough Council announced that a £250m scheme for the shopping area has been pulled by Stevenage Regeneration Limited (SRL) because of the continuing adverse economic conditions. The plans, which included realigning streets, moving the bus station, and building a new department store, cinema, hotel, restaurants, and flats, had been given council planning approval in January 2012.

=== Events ===
Stevenage holds a number of annual events, including Stevenage Day and Rock in the Park. In past years Stevenage Carnival has also been held, with a number of attempts to revive it. In June 2022, Stevenage Day returned to the King George Playing Fields to celebrate the platinum jubilee of Elizabeth II. It was the first carnival held in Stevenage since 2019, due to the coronavirus pandemic.

In 2016, Stevenage "celebrated" its seventieth anniversary as a New Town.

=== Later schemes ===
The Town Centre Regeneration Strategy (2002) called for better-quality shops (including a major department store), improved public transport with a combined bus and rail interchange, high-density town-centre living, substantially improved civic facilities, increased office space and an improved 'public realm'. YMCA Space Stevenage (a youth and community centre) was evicted and replaced by Paddy Power (a betting shop). Other well-known stores, such as Maplin Electronics, and Marks & Spencer have also disappeared from Stevenage town centre.

The town has a large central library in Southgate, at the southern end of the pedestrian precinct, with facilities including printing, fax and photocopying, children's events, study space, a carers' information point and a large public computer suite, as well as a small branch library at the northern end of the High Street in the Old Town. There is also a public library in nearby Knebworth, located in St Martin's Road.

The town is still growing. It is set to expand west of the A1(M) motorway and may be further identified for development. The main area of more recent development is Great Ashby to the north-east of the town (but actually in North Hertfordshire District). A considerable amount of in-borough development has been undertaken at Chrysalis Park on the old Dixon's Warehouse site adjacent to the Pin Green Industrial Estate.

=== Regeneration ===
The town and the Stevenage First partnership has now launched a new, £1bn, 20-year regeneration programme designed to transform central spaces and introduce new residential, commercial and retail facilities, amongst others. The programme is formed of a number of individual schemes including the £350m ‘SG1’ programme being led by Mace and the £50m redevelopment of Queensway North, the former site of Marks & Spencer. In addition, Stevenage's Town Square is also being regenerated with new bars, restaurants, flexible working facilities and shops being introduced to the area. The plans are based on the local government authority's Local Plan which was given approval on 26 March 2019. The town is also introducing a new public services hub which will consolidate services that are currently spread across Stevenage into one central space A new Bus Interchange opened on Sunday 26 June 2022, closer to the train station, and adjacent to the Gordon Craig Theatre. A number of other developments, including the conversion of a series of commercial spaces into residential facilities, are already completed or underway with a series of additional programmes set to launch in the coming years.

In 2026 Stevenage Market relocated to a new building in Boston House. The old 1970s market hall was converted into a campus for North Herts College.

== Geography ==
=== Climate ===
Stevenage experiences an oceanic climate (Köppen climate classification Cfb) similar to almost all of the United Kingdom.

Climate data for Stevenage
Month	Jan	Feb	Mar	Apr	May	Jun	Jul	Aug	Sep	Oct	Nov	Dec	Year
Mean daily maximum °C (°F)	7 (45)	8 (46)	11 (52)	13 (55)	17 (63)	19 (66)	22 (72)	23 (73)	19 (66)	14 (57)	10 (50)	7 (45)	14 (57)
Mean daily minimum °C (°F)	2 (36)	2 (36)	4 (39)	4 (39)	7 (45)	10 (50)	12 (54)	12 (54)	10 (50)	8 (46)	5 (41)	3 (37)	7 (45)
Average precipitation mm (inches)	45.1 (1.78)	33.9 (1.33)	28.7 (1.13)	43.9 (1.73)	34.9 (1.37)	46.6 (1.83)	42.1 (1.66)	46.9 (1.85)	54.9 (2.16)	56.8 (2.24)	48.0 (1.89)	49.8 (1.96)	531.6 (20.93)

=== Neighbourhoods ===
Bedwell, Bragbury End, Broadwater, Chells, Chells Manor, Pin Green, Poplars, Old Town, Great Ashby, Shephall and Symonds Green.

== Governance ==
Stevenage
- Local Government District (1873–1894); Urban District (1894–1974)
- Population
  - 1891: 3,309
  - 1971: 66,585
- History
  - Created: 2 October 1873
  - Abolished: 31 March 1974
  - Succeeded by: Stevenage Borough Council
  - HQ: Stevenage
- Contained within
  - County Council: Hertfordshire

There are two tiers of local government covering Stevenage, at district and county level: Stevenage Borough Council and Hertfordshire County Council.

Stevenage was an ancient parish in the hundred of Broadwater. From 1835 Stevenage was included in the Hitchin Poor Law Union. As such it became part of the Hitchin Rural Sanitary District in 1872, with local government functions passing to the Hitchin Board of Guardians. The following year the town voted to become a Local Government District governed by a Local Board, which would have the effect of also making the town an Urban Sanitary District, independent of the Hitchin Rural Sanitary District. The Stevenage Local Government District took effect on 2 October 1873, covering the whole parish of Stevenage. The first meeting of the Stevenage Local Board was held on 4 December 1873 at the recently built Town Hall on Orchard Road. The first chairman of the board was George Becher Blomfield, who was the rector of the town's parish church of St Nicholas.

Under the Local Government Act 1894, the Local Board became Stevenage Urban District Council on 31 December 1894. Stevenage Urban District was enlarged several times, notably in 1953 when it absorbed the neighbouring parish of Shephall. Until 1964 the council met at the Town Hall on Orchard Road. With the designation of the New Town, several plans for a civic centre in the new town centre were put forward, but none came to fruition. In September 1964, the council moved its offices and meeting place to a recently built office building in the new town centre called Southgate House (later renamed Vista Tower). The old Town Hall was demolished shortly afterwards to make way for Lytton Way. The council was based at Southgate House until 1980, when it moved to Daneshill House, which had previously been the headquarters of the New Town Corporation.

The Local Government Act 1972 abolished Stevenage Urban District and merged it with the parts of Aston and Datchworth that were within the designated area of Stevenage New Town from Hertford Rural District to form a Stevenage non-metropolitan district with effect from 1 April 1974. No successor parish was formed so it became unparished. The town was awarded borough status on the same date and has been governed by Stevenage Borough Council since. The borough's coat of arms consists of a shield and crest. On the shield is a sword running through an oak tree with acorns. The oak tree represents surrounding woodland and the acorns symbolise the steady growth of the town. The sword is from the Arms of the Bishops of London, former landowners. A red fesse depicts the Great North Road and upon the fesse are six stars representing the neighbourhoods of Old Stevenage, Bedwell, Broadwater, Shephall, Chells and Pin Green. The hart on the crest is from the arms of the county of Hertfordshire; one of its hooves rests upon a cogwheel, a symbol of the town's industry. The gold crown atop a helmet represents a planned area.

Under current local government reorganisation plans, all district councils in Hertfordshire, as well as the county council, will be abolished in 2028, with Stevenage becoming part of a new Central Hertfordshire unitary authority.

== Demographics ==
The population of Stevenage increased significantly during the 20th century. Little more than a large village at the start of the 19th century, the population in 1801 was 1,430. By 1901, Stevenage opened the 20th century with a population of 4,048.

After Stevenage was designated a new town under the New Towns Act of 1946, the population exploded in the 1950s and 1960s. By the start of the 21st century, the 2001 population had grown to 79,715 reaching 83,957 a decade later (2011). The 2021–2022 United Kingdom censuses recorded the population at 89,495.

== Religion ==
As of the 2021 census, the religious makeup was:

Area	All people	Christian (%)	Buddhist (%)	Hindu (%)	Jewish (%)	Muslim (%)	Sikh (%)	Other (%)	No religion (%)	Not stated (%)
England and Wales	56,490,048	46.3	0.5	1.8	0.5	6.7	0.9	0.6	36.7	6.0
Stevenage	89,495	43.26	0.44	1.56	0.18	3.15	0.34	0.58	44.87	5.60

== Sport and leisure ==
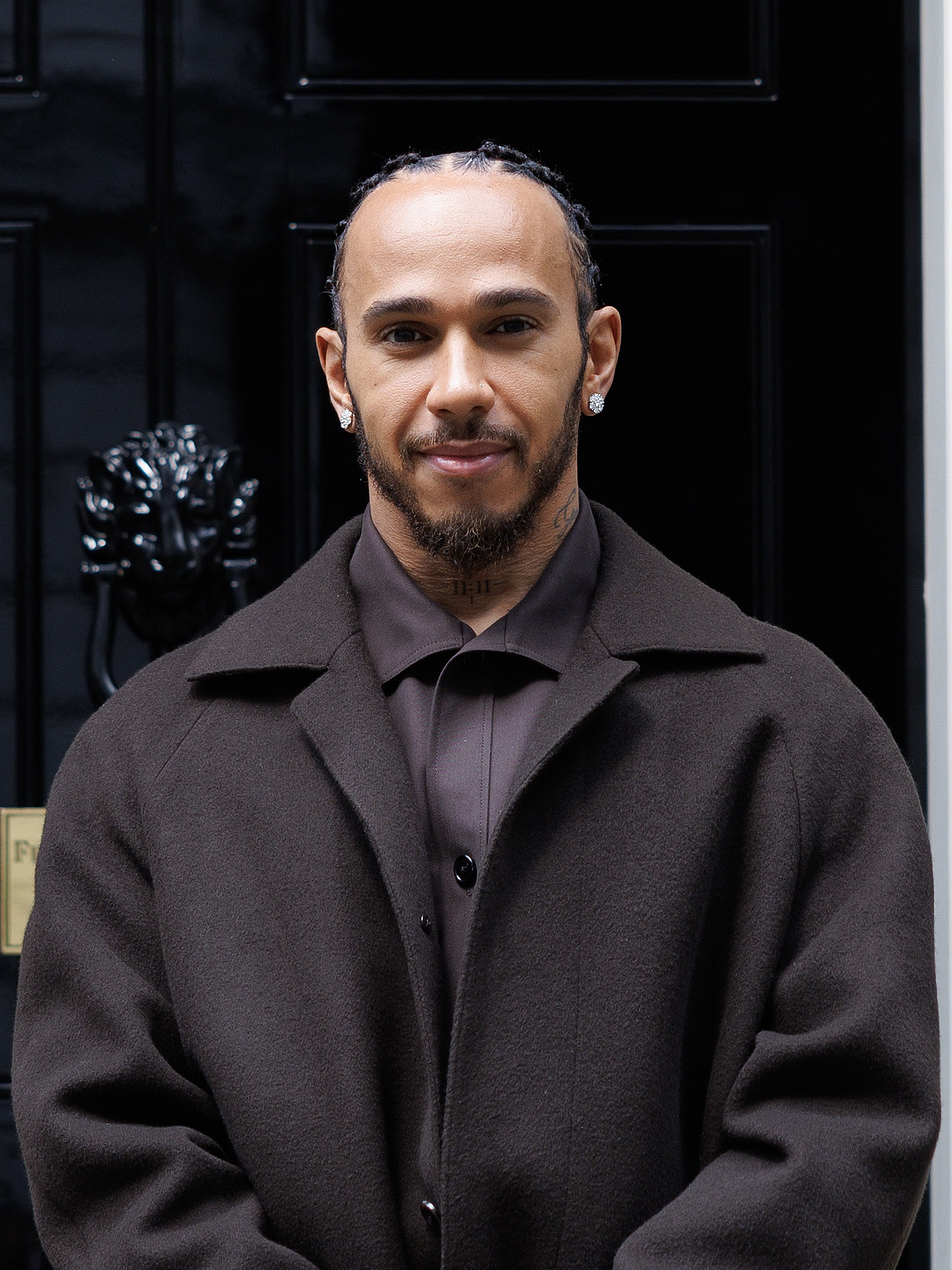
7-time F1 champion Lewis Hamilton is a resident of Stevenage.

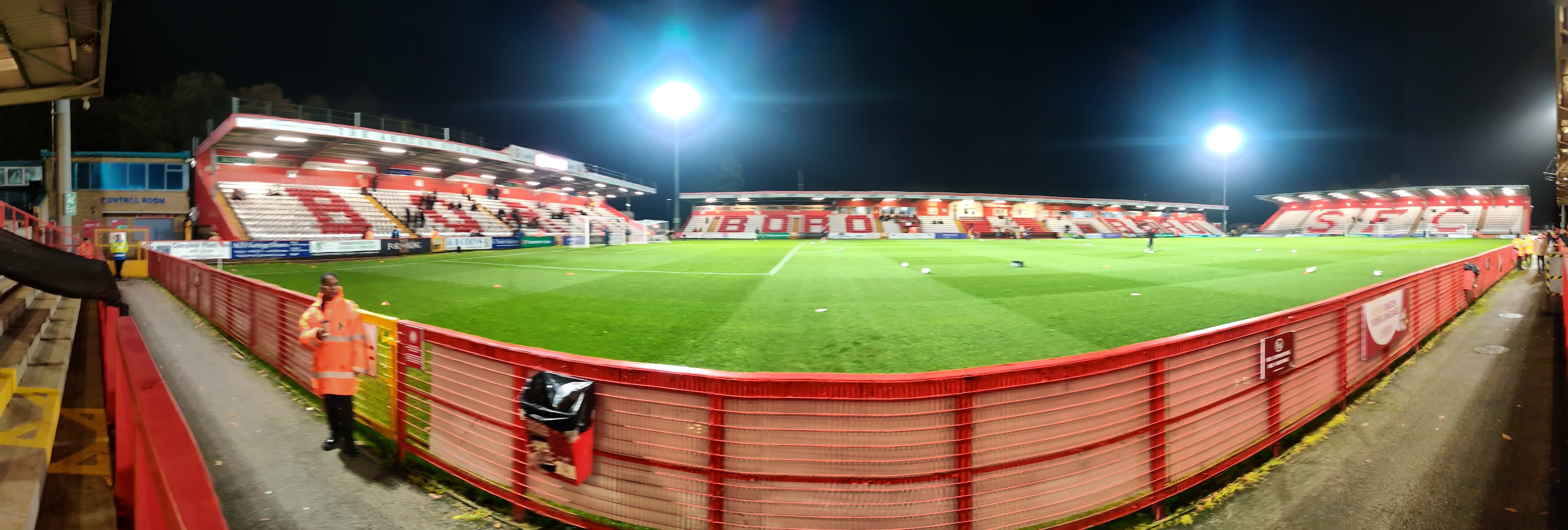
Stevenage FC stadium in 2022.

King George's Field, named in memory of King George V, hosts Stevenage Cricket Club, Stevenage Hockey Club and Stevenage Town Bowls Club. The cricket ground is called Ditchmore Lane. The nearby Stevenage Leisure Park has a multiplex cinema, clubs, and restaurants. The main shopping area is around Queensway and the Westgate. At the south of the town, there is a retail park called 9Yards (formerly Roaring Meg), its former name being taken from a stream (a tributary of the River Beane) that runs under it. The river can be seen along the western edge of the area. There is also shopping in the Old Town. 9Yards once had an ice rink and bowling alley, but these were demolished in 2000 to allow the construction of more stores.

Stevenage FC, formerly known as Stevenage Borough, is the town's major football team, playing their home matches at Broadhall Way. Founded in 1976, the club were promoted to the Football Conference, the highest tier of non-league football, in 1994. After sixteen seasons in this division, Stevenage won the Conference Premier title during the 2009–10 season, having previously been denied promotion to the Football League due to insufficient ground facilities in 1996. During Stevenage's first season as a Football League club, they secured back-to-back promotions to League One, the third tier of English football, after beating Torquay United 1–0 in the 2010–11 play-off final at Old Trafford.

Stevenage also won the FA Trophy in 2007, beating Kidderminster Harriers 3–2 at Wembley Stadium in front of a crowd of 53,262. It was the first competitive club game and cup final to be held at the new stadium. Stevenage reached the final again in 2009, beating York City 2–0. The club has also enjoyed several runs in the FA Cup, raising the town's profile in the process. During the 1997–98 campaign, Stevenage held Premier League side Newcastle United to a draw at Broadhall Way, before losing the replay 2–1 at Newcastle. The club would go one better in 2010, securing a 3–1 home victory over Newcastle in the third round of the competition – the first time the club had beaten first tier opposition. The following season, Stevenage held Tottenham Hotspur to a 0–0 draw at home in the fifth round, before losing the subsequent replay 3–1 at White Hart Lane.

The town also has a number of other successful sports clubs, including a women's football team (Stevenage Borough Ladies FC) and Stevenage Town Rugby Club. Many top class sporting heroes have come from Stevenage, including footballers Kevin Phillips and Ashley Young, 7-time Formula One World Champion Lewis Hamilton, and golfer Ian Poulter.

Fairlands Valley is a large area of parkland with boating lakes. It is home to a Parkrun. The town is a very green town, with avenues of trees (typically Norway Maple) throughout but also large woods such as Monks & Whomerley Wood, which is ancient semi-natural woodland. Indeed, the Woodland Trust ranks it as one of the best places in the UK for ease of access to large woodland, with 99.9% of the population having access to woodland over 2 hectares (5 acres) within 4 km (2.5 mi), only slightly behind those living in the Forest of Dean or New Forest. There are also many playing fields (e.g. St. Nicholas playing fields near Ripon Road). The town's schools all have a substantial amount of ground; key examples are Ashtree Primary School, Moss Bury Primary School, Longmeadow Primary School and Barnwell.

Stevenage also has a basketball team: East Herts Royals (Formerly known as Stevenage Scorpions)

The town is surrounded by the Stevenage Outer Orbital Path (STOOP), a 27-mile (43 km) circuit walk established by the North Herts Ramblers Group in 2008. The circuit provides an informal, active recreational leisure amenity readily available to the residents of Stevenage and the surrounding villages. The STOOP is split into several sections, accessible via a series of links from the town. The route passes through Graveley, Walkern, Beane Valley, Datchworth, Woolmer Green, Knebworth Park, St Ippolyts and Little Wymondley. It was launched on 20 September 2008.

== Culture ==
A small community arts centre is located in the Roaring Meg Retail Park. The Boxfield and Foyer Gallery is situated in the Gordon Craig Theatre, which forms part of the large central Leisure Centre. Stevenage Museum is located under the St. Andrew and St. George's church on St George's Way.

Local news and television programmes are provided by BBC East and BBC London on BBC One and ITV Anglia and ITV London on ITV. Television signals are received from either the Sandy Heath or Crystal Palace transmitters.

Local radio stations are BBC Three Counties Radio on 90.4 FM and Heart Hertfordshire on 106.7 FM.

The Comet is the town's weekly local newspaper.

== Nearby attractions ==
North of Stevenage Old Town, near St Nicholas' Church, lies Rooks' Nest ("under the big wych-elm"), home of the novelist E. M. Forster from 1884 to 1894. Forster used Rooksnest and the surrounding area as the setting for his novel Howards End. In the preface to one paperback edition of Howards End there is information about landmarks of Stevenage and their relationship to the story of the novel, such as Stevenage High Street and the Six Hills. The land north of St Nicholas' Church, known as Forster Country, is the last remaining farmland within the boundary of Stevenage borough. Forster was unhappy with the development of new Stevenage, which would, in his words, "fall out of the blue sky like a meteorite upon the ancient and delicate scenery of Hertfordshire".

In the spring of 2023, Forster Country was threatened by housing development. 2,000 people petitioned the council to rethink plans to build a car park, landfill site and power station in the country park.

To the south of Stevenage is Knebworth House, a gothic stately home and venue of globally renowned rock concerts since 1974. The house was once home to Sir Edward Bulwer-Lytton, Victorian English novelist and spiritualist.

Astonbury Wood, south-east of Stevenage, is a nature reserve of Herts and Middlesex Wildlife Trust. It is ancient woodland, area 54 hectares (130 acres).

Six Hills Brewing, established in 2019, has a real ale taphouse called the Broken Seal and working brewery in Basils Road, Old Town. Guided tours are available for visitors as of 2025. Each beer produced by Six Hills Brewery is named after a figure from Stevenage's history such as the footballer Frank Dymoke, actress Ellen Terry, roundhead secretary of state John Thurlow and the hangman Albert Pierrepoint who stayed at what is now the Cromwell Hotel.

== Transport ==
A distinctive feature of Stevenage is its urban landscape. There are many roundabouts, few traffic lights, a network of completely segregated cycleways, and some of the tallest street lights in Britain. Eric Claxton was chief engineer of Stevenage from 1962 to 1972, and the comprehensive separate cycle network was planned and implemented by him during that period. Despite this network, the bicycle's modal share is 2.7%. Claxton was also of the view that Stevenage should contain as few traffic lights as possible, hence his preference for roundabouts to regulate traffic flow. He was so adamant about roundabouts that he had a house built for himself on the gyratory system in the Old Town.

The A1(M) motorway bypasses the town to the west. Work on the 7.5-mile bypass was started on Monday 30 May 1960 at Langley Sidings, by Ernest Marples. 54 miles of dual carriageway, on the A1, had been opened, with 75 miles under construction. It would cost £1.8m, to take 19 months. The southern end started from a roundabout at the Clock restaurant near Welwyn. The bridges were built by Simon Carves of south Manchester, and the main contractor was Martin Cowley Ltd, of Clay Cross, in Derbyshire. The old Great North Road, in part classified as the B197, runs through the town and the Old Town's High Street has several pubs that were formerly coaching inns. The A602 connects the town to Hitchin, Watton-at-Stone, Hertford and Ware.

The main bus operator is Arriva Herts & Essex, which have a depot situated on Babbage Road. They run over 10 routes in and around the town, with intercity services to Luton (on the 100/101/101A), St Albans (on the 301), Welwyn Garden City (on the 400), and Letchworth Garden City (on the 55). They also operate the majority of the SuperBus local town network, with routes having the SB prefix. CentralConnect operate the SB6 Bedwell and Shephall circular and the SB11 Old Town circular. Centrebus operates the SB10 Old Town Circular on Saturdays only, in lieu of the SB11.

Another operator in the town is unō, who run the 625 between Stevenage and Hatfield which provides discounted travel to University of Hertfordshire students. This service replaced the 635 in 2025 after unō performed some network rationalisation, it having previously operated between Hitchin and Watford via Stevenage.

Centrebus also operate some services out of their Luton depot, including the Connect Herts branded routes 390 and 907, to Hertford and Cheshunt respectively. In 2025, Centrebus were awarded the Hertfordshire County Council contracted service 92, a new route linking Stevenage with Baldock via Letchworth Garden City, which runs hourly Monday to Saturday, and every two hours on Sundays.

CentralConnect also operate in the town. Almost all of the services they operate are Hertfordshire County Council contracted services, not run on a commercial basis.

On Sunday 26 June 2022, the new Stevenage Interchange opened, replacing the former bus station as that land needed to be repurposed for redevelopment. The new bus station has accessible toilets, a heated and air conditioned waiting room with a help desk, a small shop and a small café. It has 10 stands lettered A to K, skipping I. On Lytton Way, there is a coach stand, lettered L.

Formerly, the only coach service to operate to Stand L was the 006 between Cambridge and London, operated by FlixBus. As of February 2026, Stevenage is not served by any scheduled coach services.

Stevenage has one railway station, Stevenage railway station, on the East Coast Main Line. Regular commuter services operate to London King's Cross (taking 24 minutes) and Cambridge (taking 37 minutes), as well as long-distance services to northern England and Scotland. Thameslink also operate commuter services to the south of London to destinations such as Horsham, Brighton and others, via the Canal Tunnels and Thameslink core.

== Education ==
Many schools were built in the 1950s/60s due to an influx of Londoners to affordable terraced housing in areas such as Shephall, Broadwater, Chells and St Nicholas. The town has around 23 primary schools (see below). Some go to the surrounding villages of Aston, Benington, Walkern, Datchworth for their schooling. Stevenage also has a number of secondary schools and the central campus for North Hertfordshire College.

=== Primary schools ===
- Almond Hill Junior
- Ashtree Primary School and Nursery
- Bedwell Primary School and Nursery
- Broom Barns Community Primary
- Camps Hill Community Primary
- Fairlands Primary School and Nursery
- Featherstone Wood Primary School and Nursery
- Giles Junior
- Giles Nursery and Infants
- Letchmore Infants' and Nursery
- The Leys Primary and Nursery
- Lodge Farm Primary
- Longmeadow Primary
- Martins Wood Primary
- Moss Bury Primary School and Nursery
- Peartree Spring Primary
- Roebuck Primary School and Nursery
- Shephalbury Park Primary
- St Margaret Clitherow Roman Catholic Primary
- St Nicholas C of E Primary School and Nursery
- St Vincent de Paul Catholic Primary
- Trotts Hill Primary and Nursery
- Woolenwick Infant and Nursery
- Woolenwick JM

=== Special needs schools ===
- Larwood Primary
- Lonsdale
- Greenside
- The Valley Secondary
- Barnwell (containing the VIBase for blind and visually impaired pupils and the SPLD Base for Pupils with specific learning difficulties)

=== Secondary schools ===
- Barnwell School – in 2006, Barnwell school took in students from Collenswood School after its closure. Students are now taught on two sites: Barnwell Middle Campus and Barnwell Upper Campus
- Barclay Academy
- The John Henry Newman School – a specialist arts school
- Marriotts School – A sports college. Marriotts converted to sponsored Academy status with potential completion in September 2016
- The Nobel School – a specialist performing arts and science DCSF training school
- The Thomas Alleyne Academy

=== Colleges ===
- North Hertfordshire College (Stevenage Campus), Monkswood Way, Stevenage, SG1 1LA

=== Former schools ===
- Round Diamond (site in Pin Green closed and relocated to Great Ashby, now officially classified as a North Hertfordshire school)
- Pope Pius XII RC JMI (site in Chells closed and amalgamated with St John Southworth RC JMI, September 1990)
- St John Southworth RC JMI (site in Bedwell amalgamated with Pope Pius XII RC JMI to become St Vincent de Paul Catholic Primary, September 1990)
- Pin Green JMI
- Burydale (amalgamated with Shephall Green Infant School in September 2005, now closed)
- Collenswood School (secondary school, closed in 2006 and the site became part of Barnwell School)
- Stevenage Girls School (amalgamated with Alleyne's School to become The Thomas Alleyne School)
- Chells School (a secondary school, the former site of which is now occupied by The Nobel School)
- Heathcote School (secondary school, closed in 2012 and the site became part of Barnwell School)
- St Michael's (Catholic boys secondary school, moved from Mount St Michael France to Hitchin then to Stevenage now amalgamated with St Angela's to form John Henry Newman)
- Shephalbury Secondary Modern School (Shephalbury Park, now a housing estate)
- The Grange (c.1847–c.1939)
- Bedwell Secondary School (the former site is now occupied by Marriotts School)
- The Da Vinci Studio School of Science and Engineering – a studio school specialising in science and engineering

== Places of worship ==
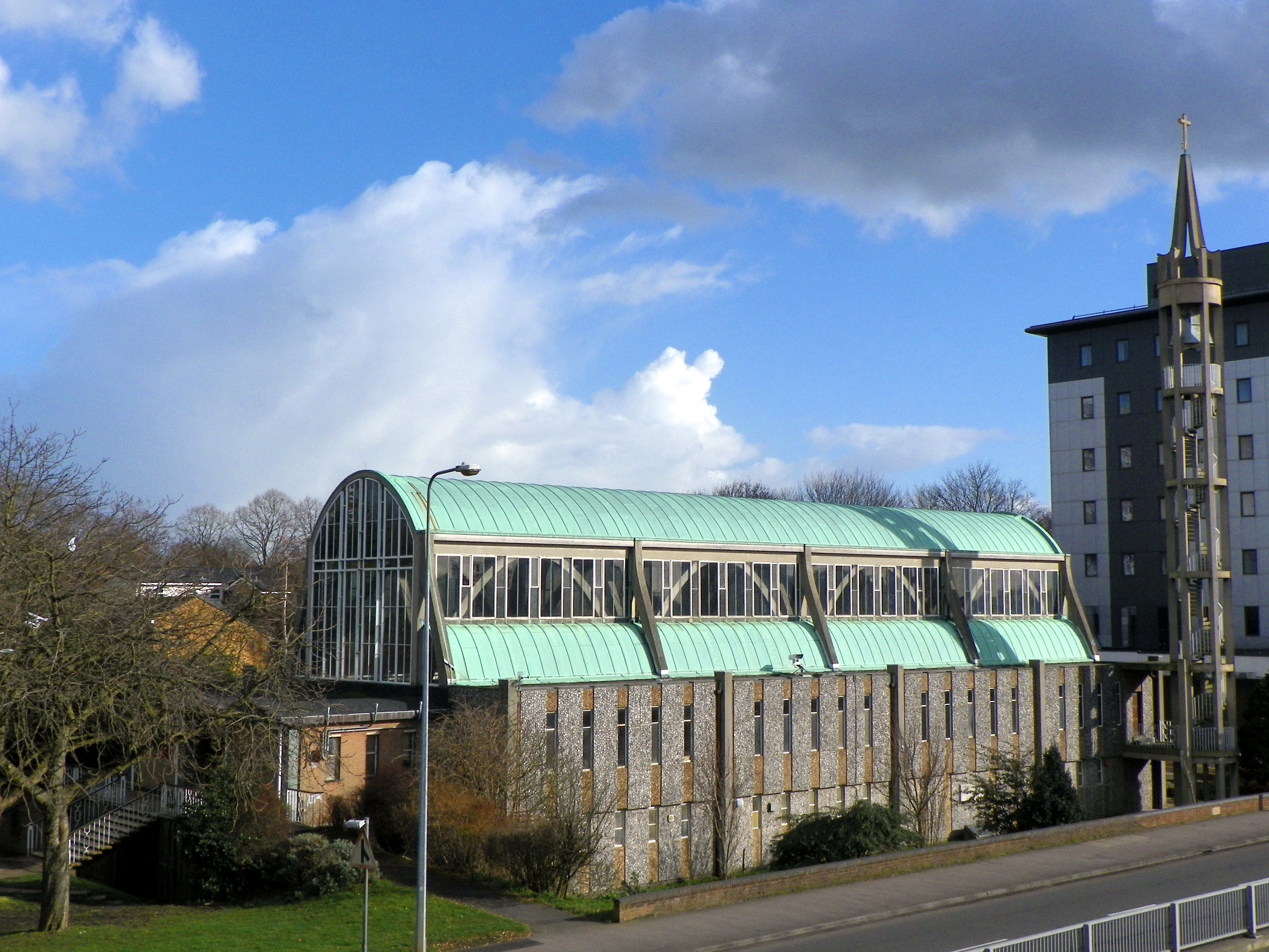
Church of St Andrew & St George, 2014

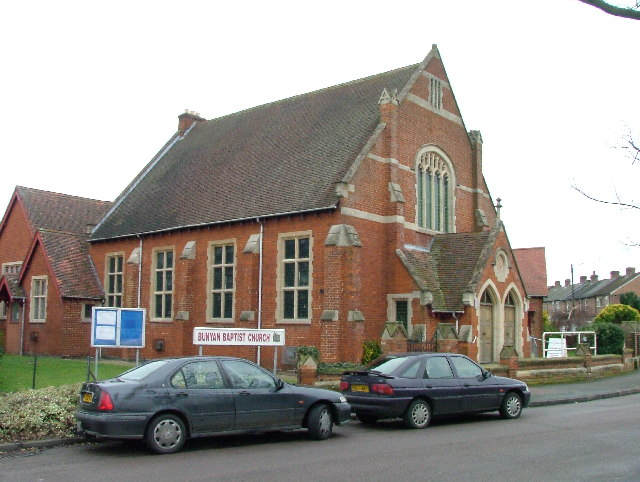
Bunyan Baptist Church, 2005

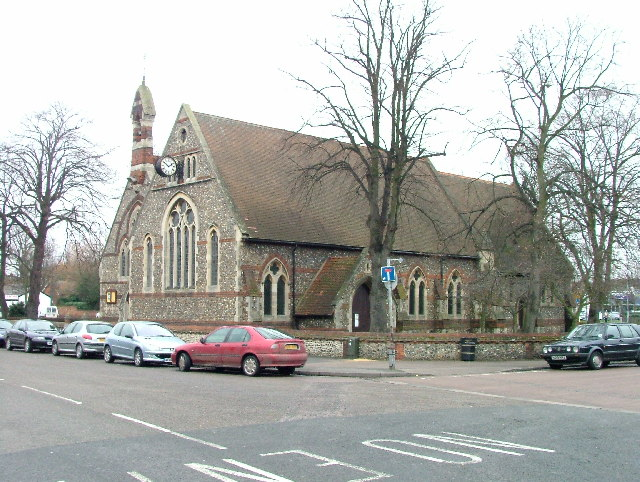
Holy Trinity Church, 2005

Stevenage has an active network of Christian churches of many denominations. Many of the churches work together for town-wide projects under the banner of "Churches Together in Stevenage". Stevenage also has a mosque and a Liberal Jewish Synagogue. Alongside "Churches Together in Stevenage", Stevenage also has an "Interfaith Forum" dedicated to dialogue between different religious presences in the town.

Some of the places of worship include:

- All Saints Church (Anglican/Methodist Union)
- Bunyan Baptist Church
- Christ the King Church (Anglican)
- City of David Church (Redeemed Christian Church of God)
- The Cathedral of Saint George (Coptic Orthodox)
- Elim Pentecostal Church
- Grace Community Church (Newfrontiers)
- Great Ashby Community Church (Anglican/Baptist Joint Project)
- High Street Methodist Church
- Holy Trinity Church (Anglican)
- Kingdom Hall of Jehovah's Witnesses
- Longmeadow Evangelical Church
- Friends Meeting House (Quakers)
- Oak Church Stevenage – A youth-focused Anglican Church
- Roman Catholic Church of St Hilda
- Roman Catholic Church of St Joseph
- Roman Catholic Church of the Transfiguration
- Salvation Army Corps
- Church of St Andrew & St George (Anglican)
- Seventh-day Adventist Church
- Stevenage Liberal Synagogue (Liberal Judaism)
- Stevenage Muslim Community Centre
- St Hugh & St John Church (Anglican/Methodist Union)
- St Mary's Church (Anglican)
- St Nicholas' Church (Anglican)
- St Paul's Church (Methodist)
- St Peter's Church (Anglican)
- Stevenage Vineyard Fellowship
- The Church of Jesus Christ of Latter-day Saints – Stevenage Ward
- United Reformed Church
- Whomerley Spiritual Church & Centre

== Notable people ==
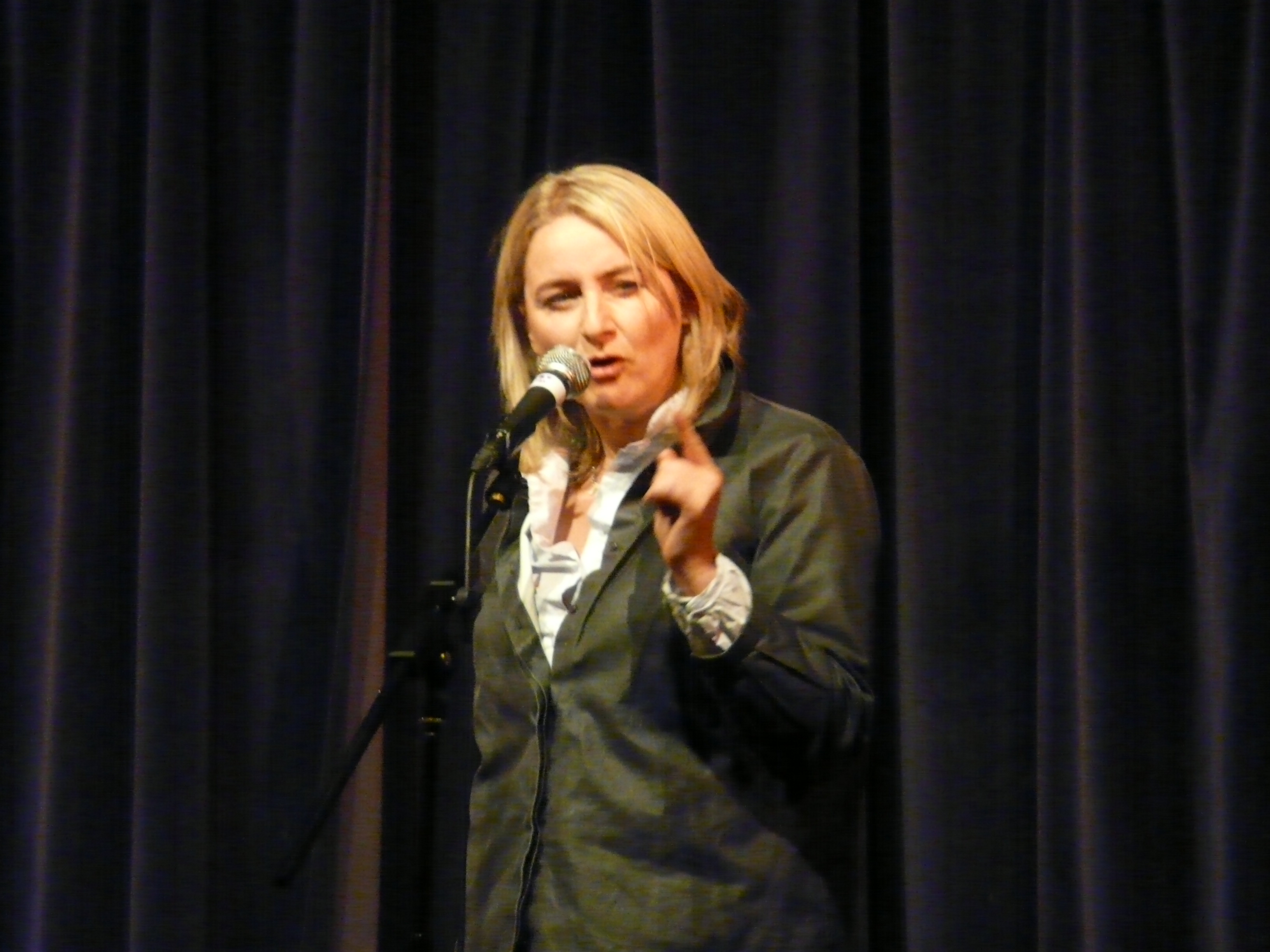
Actress Emma Kennedy, 2011

Born in Stevenage

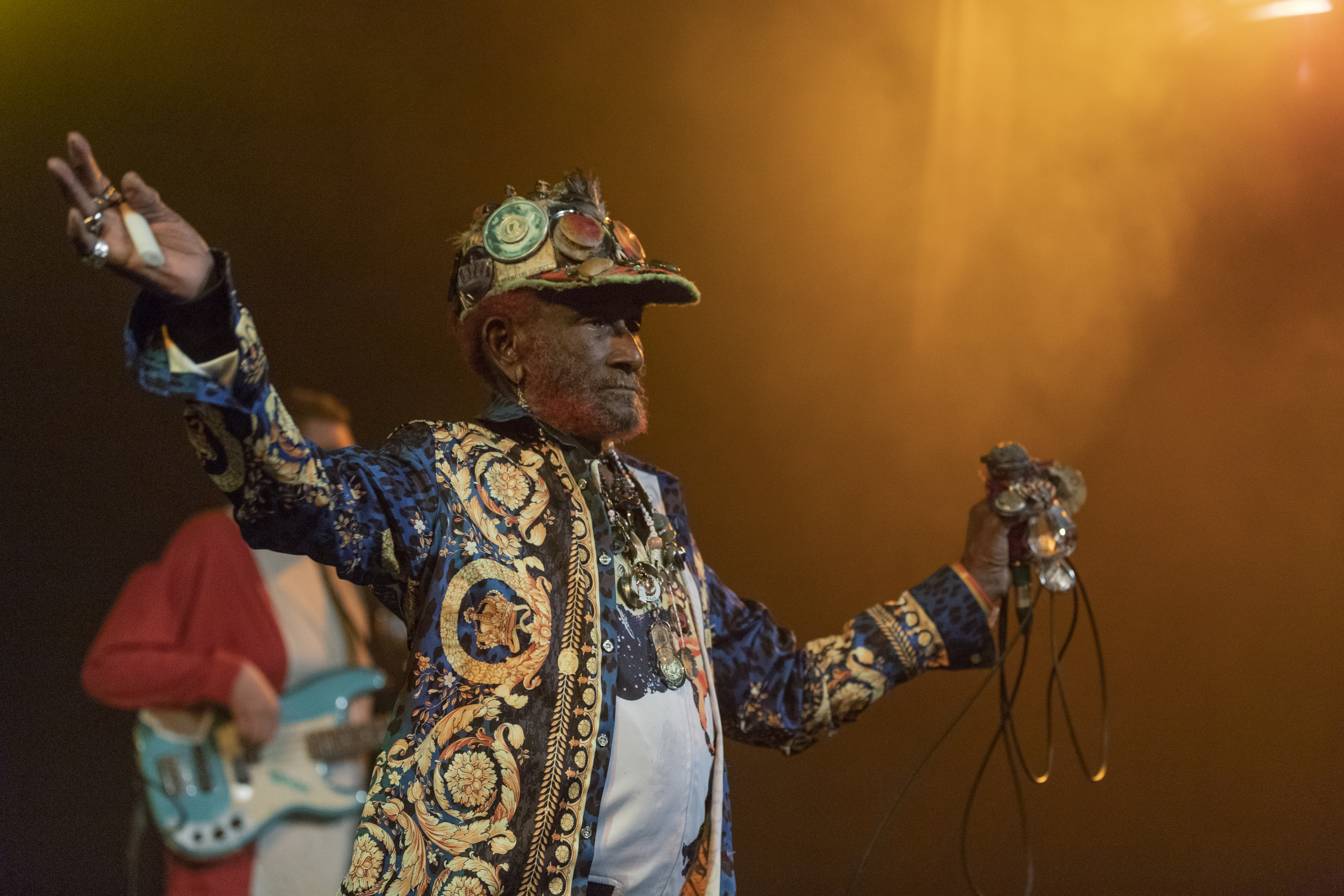
Scratch Perry, 2019

- Omo Aikeremiokha (born 2005), trampoline gymnast
- Daniel Ballard (b. 1999), Sunderland A.F.C. footballer
- Harry Bates (1850–1899), sculptor
- Oliver Cheshire (b. 1988), fashion model
- Sir Thomas Clarke (b. 1527), knighted by Henry VIII.
- E. E. Cowper (1859–1930), novelist
- Edward Gordon Craig (1872–1966), scenographer and theatre theorist
- Andrew Croft (1906–1991) explorer and SOE (Special Operations Executive) agent
- David Croft (b. 1970), Commentator for Sky Sports F1
- Keinan Davis (b. 1998), Aston Villa footballer
- Mark E'Beyer (b. 1984), footballer
- Albert and Ebenezer Fox (1857–1926, 1857–1936), infamous poachers
- Marshall Frost (born 2005), trampoline gymnast
- Gabz Gardiner, finalist in series 7 of Britain's Got Talent
- Sir Lewis Hamilton (b. 1985), seven-time Formula One World Champion (2008, 2014, 2015, 2017, 2018, 2019, 2020)
- Nicolas Hamilton (b. 1992), racing driver
- Peter Harper (1921–2003) International Rally Driver
- Aleks Josh, contestant on The Voice UK
- William Jowitt, 1st Earl Jowitt (1885–1957), Lord High Chancellor of Great Britain from 1945 to 1951
- Nadeem Leigh, contestant on The Voice UK
- Cathy Lesurf (born 1953), singer and member of bands such as Oysterband, Fiddler's Dram, Fairport Convention and The Albion Country Band
- Edward Morse (born 1986), English cricketer
- Richard Norwood (c. 1590–1675), first person to survey the islands of Bermuda
- Alex Pettyfer (b. 1990), actor
- Elizabeth Poston (1905–1987), composer, born in Highfield House, Pin Green (now the site of Hampson Park) and later lived in Rooks Nest.
- Jason Shackell (b. 1983), footballer
- Henry Trigg (c. 1667–1724), local grocer who became famous for his eccentric will
- Sam Wallace, Chief Football Writer at The Daily Telegraph since 2015.
- Ed Westwick (b. 1987), actor
- Ben Wilmot (b. 1999), Stoke City F.C. footballer
- Karen Woo, surgeon, killed along with other aid workers in Afghanistan (2010 Badakhshan massacre)
- Anthony (Tony) John Wright (b. 1962), cricketer
- Ashley Young (b. 1985), former Everton footballer and former Manchester United captain
- Gary Younge, (b. 1969), journalist, author. Lived in Stevenage until the age of 17.

Stevenage residents

- George Brown (1912–79), motorcyclist, worked for the Vincent Motorcycle Company from 1933 to 1951 and died in Stevenage in 1979.
- Francis Cammaerts (1916–2006), French Resistance leader, headmaster of Alleyne's Grammar School and witness in the Lady Chatterley Trial, October 1960.
- John Cooper Clarke (born 1949), performance poet, briefly lived in Stevenage, and allegedly wrote "Evidently Chickentown" about his experiences in the locale.
- Evelyn Denington, Baroness Denington (1907–1998), politician who served as chair of the Stevenage Development Corporation
- Denholm Elliott (1922–1992), actor, who lived in the house now known as the 'Little Folks Lab' nursery in North Road.
- Thomas Fellowes (1827–1923), Royal Navy officer
- Ken Follett (born 1947), author
- E. M. Forster (1879–1970), novelist, lived in the house at Rooks Nest from 1883 to 1893.
- Tommy Hampson (1907–1965), Olympic athlete. Hampson Park is named after him.
- Ken Hensley (1945–2020), keyboard player and main songwriter of Uriah Heep in the 1970s
- Denis Ovens (b. 1957), former professional darts player
- Emma Kennedy (born 1967), who wrote the BBC drama The Kennedys based on her childhood there
- Stephen McPartland (born 1976), MP for Stevenage 2010–2024
- Wilf Mannion (1918–2000), English international footballer. Landlord of The Pied Piper, Oaks Cross.
- Miguel of Portugal (1802–1866), King of Portugal between 1828 and 1834, is reputed to have lived on the High Street around 1845
- Lee "Scratch" Perry (1936–2021), Jamaican reggae musician and record producer, recorded Battle of Armagideon (Millionaire Liquidator) with primarily local musicians. He played at Stevenage College and at the Pyramid public house when he lived in the town during the 1980s.
- Leslie Phillips (1924–2022), actor, evacuated to Stevenage during the Second World War.
- David Schaal (born 1963), actor, spent his teenage years in Stevenage.
- Naum Slutzky (1894–1965), designer, master of Bauhaus University, Weimar
- John Thurloe (1616–1668), secretary to Oliver Cromwell, lived in what is now the Cromwell Hotel

== In popular culture ==
Stevenage was the setting for two feature films, Here We Go Round the Mulberry Bush (1967) and Boston Kickout (1995). Stevenage was the filming location, though not the on-screen setting, for two other films, Serious Charge (1959) and Spy Game (2001), standing in as the Washington, D.C. area for the latter film. The 2009 psychological horror found footage short film and web series No Through Road by Steven Chamberlain follows four seventeen-year-old teenagers en route to Stevenage who find themselves trapped in a time loop along two road signs marking an intersection between Benington and Watton. The 2015 BBC One comedy series The Kennedys is set on an estate in New Town Stevenage. Saxondale a critically acclaimed 2007 situation comedy starring Steve Coogan as a divorcee and ex-roadie with anger management issues. The 2018 Channel 4 comedy series, Lee and Dean, is filmed and set in Stevenage. In one episode of UK quiz show Only Connect, one of the contestants made what could be seen as a frivolous mention of Stevenage, playfully suggesting that that could be where the literary character Mrs Malaprop comes from. Coincidentally, the title of the quiz show is taken from the E. M. Forster novel Howards End, which Forster based on a house he lived in Stevenage between 1883 and 1893.

Stevenage woman has been profiled as a crucial swing voter for the 2024 general election.

== Twin towns ==
City	Country	Year
Ingelheim am Rhein	Germany	1963
Autun	France	1975
Kadoma	Zimbabwe	1989
Shymkent	Kazakhstan	1990

== See also ==
- Grade I listed buildings in Stevenage
- Grade II* listed buildings in Stevenage
- Stevenage (UK Parliament constituency)
- Stevenage Brook
