= Six Hills =

Collection of Roman barrows in Stevenage, Hertfordshire, England

Coordinates: 51.897945°N 0.203033°W

The Six Hills, October 2026

The Six Hills are a collection of Roman barrows situated alongside the old Great North Road on Six Hills Common in Stevenage, Hertfordshire, England. They are classed as a Scheduled Ancient Monument and are protected by law. They form the largest surviving Roman barrow group in England. Beside their historical significance, they lend their name to an important thoroughfare in the town (Six Hills Way) and are a local landmark.

== History ==
For almost two thousand years, travellers along the Roman road that eventually became the Great North Road have passed these six large mounds. Their origin and purpose has been the subject of much speculation.

Local legend holds that they were the work of the Devil, who, sitting one day looking down on the Great North Road, began to amuse himself by heaving clods of earth at the passers-by. He missed six times and in a temper threw a seventh clod over his shoulder, hitting the spire of Graveley church and knocking it askew. The spire is crooked to this day. The holes in Whomerley Wood show where the Devil dug out his missiles, and the six failed shots lie in a line alongside the road and form the Six Hills.

The Six Hills are almost certainly Roman burial mounds, dating from about 100 A.D., and probably mark the cremated remains of a wealthy local family. The ashes would have been placed in a container along with objects for use in the next world.

No recent scientific archaeological excavation has been carried out on the Hills, but they have all been dug into in the past. These early investigations found only "...a few pieces of wood and a piece of iron...", which were dismissed at the time, but probably were the remains of the original burials. Other reports of damage include the farmer who was carting soil away from the Hills in 1750, and an attempted widening of the Great North Road in about 1820. Over the years, the Hills have all lost over 4 feet (1.2 m) in height.

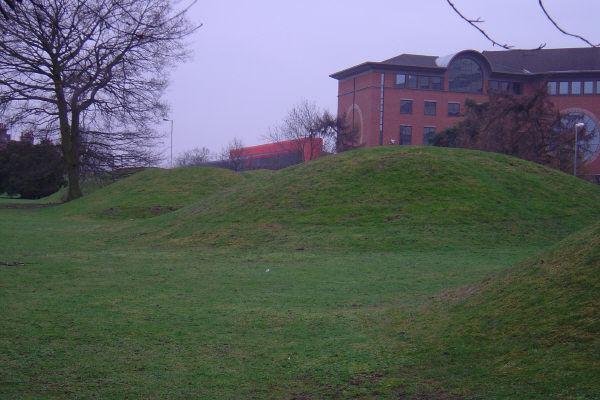
The Six Hills, April 2004

The grass around the burial mounds is of considerable age. It includes species such as bird's-foot trefoil, mouse-ear hawkweed, harebells, whitlow grass, and slender clover, which are not found in the more modern grasslands nearby.
