= Symonds Green =

Neighborhood in Stevenage, Hertfordshire, England

Coordinates: 51°54′45″N 0°13′25″W

Symonds Green is a neighbourhood within the English new town of Stevenage in Hertfordshire. Although predominantly a residential area with a mixture of public-sector, charitable and private housing dating mostly from the 1970s, the open common land forming the actual Green is of historical significance to the area.

Symonds Green was designated an English conservation area in June 1977. A conservation area is defined by the Planning [Listed Buildings and Conservation Areas] Act 1990 s.69 as being an “area of special architectural or historic interest the character or appearance of which it is desirable to preserve or enhance”. Through the Conservation Area designation certain buildings in the locality that are of historical note (despite nearby encroachment from later 20th-century housing) are protected from inappropriate development or change, thereby conserving a small part of this old rural hamlet.

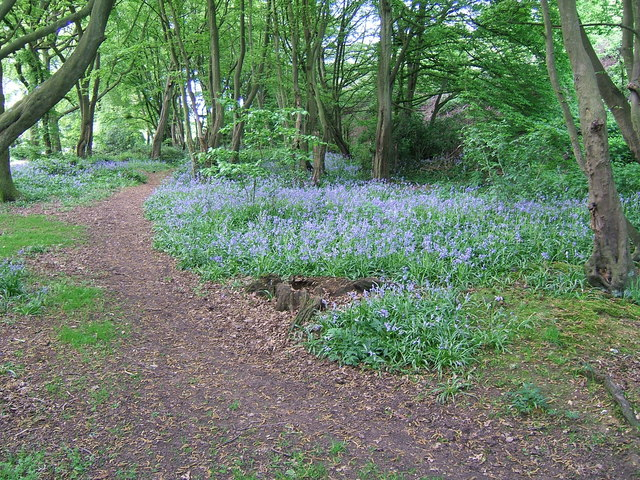
Bluebells in Lucas Wood in Symonds Green

The Crooked Billet Public House was, as evidenced by mapping of the day, on Symonds Green in the early 20th century. The original part of the present building was built circa 1920 and was extended (as it appears today) around 1980. Census records evidence the existence of a 'Beer Shop' on Symonds Green in the census returns of both 1841 & 1851. The establishment was run by Elizabeth Moules who was from Walkern, a hamlet 4¼ miles to the east of Symonds Green. The ponds adjacent to the pub are principal features of the conservation area. In 2021, The Crooked Billet became a restaurant and was renamed Tranquil Turtle. The former pub has since become an event venue.

Of the various properties near the Green, three are statutory Grade II listed. Two such cottages are to be found at either end of the Green today and can also be seen on the 1883 Ordnance Survey Map. By the 18th century a farm had developed on the site. The farmhouse still stands, and the related Grade II listed barn is believed to be the conservation area's oldest surviving building and is described within the English Heritage listings search thus: 'The barn is a near-complete example of late C16 or early C17 timber-framing, displaying carpentry detailing characteristic of Hertfordshire practice, and retaining evidence of later extension and adaptation for animal husbandry.' The farm, of which the barn formed a part, is shown on a 1766 county map and the Richardson map of Stevenage of 1834. It is also identified on the Ordnance Survey maps of both 1884 & 1889.

It can be seen from maps of the area that Symonds Green is one of several 'Greens' in and around the western boundary of Stevenage. Symonds Green Lane connected Symonds Green with Fishers Green to the north, thence by other bridleways to Todds Green and Titmore Green and, to the south, Norton Green and (now lost) Broomin Green. The Grade II listed farmhouse that served Broomin Green still stands and is to be found nestling within the 20th-century development of Stevenage Town, northeast of the junction of the A1155 Fairlands Way and A1072 Gunnels Wood Road. To the west of Symonds Green is the A1(M) motorway. Adjacent to the northbound carriageway of the motorway at this point is the route of a north–south Roman road. Today, the southern boundary of Symonds Green, roughly where Broomin Green was, comprises light industrial and office estates. The 'Meadway' playing fields are also to the south of the Symonds Green Conservation Area but do not form part of it. They were once much larger, extending east of Symonds Green Lane, but they were built upon in the 1980s with the office facilities that are there today. Modern-day Stevenage lies due east of Symonds Green and extends for over two miles.

'The Meadway' itself, from which a number of other local facilities take their name, was the principal eastbound road from Symonds Green to Old Stevenage, and its route, if not name, dates from at least 1766. This road into town was intersected (at a point toward the eastern end of the present-day Brick Kiln Road, Stevenage) following the construction in the mid-19th century of the Great Northern Railway, now part of the East Coast Main Line. The original route of The Meadway can still be followed on foot, from its origin at its junction with a track known as Kitching Lane just under the motorway at the south-eastern corner of the Meadway playing fields, to where it emerges opposite the western end of Brick Kiln Road.

Owing to the arrival of the railway, the Meadway was terminated by way of a footbridge across the railway line. On the other side of the line, the footway became Trinity Road, which served Holy Trinity Church, built in 1861, which currently remains an active part of the Stevenage Conservation Area. There remains no trace of the footbridge, which would have emerged opposite the present filling station on the corner of Woolners Way and Trinity Road. There is still a direct link between Holy Trinity Church, on Stevenage High Street, and Symonds Green, as both Holy Trinity & Christ the King in Symonds Green are churches that are part of the Stevenage Deanery, in the Archdeaconry of Hertford, and belong to the Diocese of St Albans, Church of England.

Running north–south across the common land on Symonds Green is 'Symonds Green Lane'. At the southern end of Symonds Green Lane, toward the Meadway playing fields, are a small number of 1930s houses originally built for the workers at Stevenage Nurseries, which existed nearby on the land now occupied by a 1970s housing estate, the service roadway of which provides the only vehicular access to the conservation area, which is otherwise a cul-de-sac. Symonds Green Lane narrows to a surfaced footpath at its boundary at both the south & north edges of the Conservation Area and, in turn, links into the system of Stevenage cycle paths and other designated footways.

Until the late summer of 2014, at the southern end of the green, an information notice erected by the local authority provided an account of the history of the area. Stevenage Environmental Services erected a new interpretation board for Symonds Green Common in 2015. The original board read:-

Symonds Green...covers an area of roughly five acres, although in the past it seems to have been larger than this. At the time of the Domesday Book it was part of the Manor of Woolenwick, and in the 13th century it was called Woolenwick Green. The tenants of the manor were allowed to graze their animals there. During the Middle Ages it became part of the Manor of Wymondlye and by the 15th century it was known as Hickman's Green after a local land owner. In 1581 a certain Edwarde Symonde bought land on the south side of the green and although the family moved away in 1610, the land has [probably] taken its name [then, 'Symes Green'] from him ever since. Of the houses by the green, one of the oldest is the 'Crooked Billet' public house which has been in existence for at least a century and a half. In the 1841 Census it is described as a 'Beer Shop'. At that time it was kept by Elizabeth Moules, whose family farmed much of the land in the area. Symonds Green was the birthplace of the notorious poachers, the Fox twins, who were born in 1857 in a thatched cottage behind the Crooked Billet. Albert Fox lodged in a house adjoining the pub towards the end of his life.

In addition to the conservation area, Symonds Green has a neighbourhood shopping centre, a nursery, infant and primary schools, a community centre, a church, dentists, two public houses, a health centre and several children's playgrounds. Symonds Green covers much of the area of the ancient hamlet of Woolenwick, after which the local primary school is named. A number of the modern streets in the locality are named after popular British seaside holiday towns.
