= Grade II* listed buildings in Stevenage =

There are over 20,000 Grade II* listed buildings in England. This page is a list of these buildings in the borough of Stevenage in Hertfordshire.

== List ==
Name	Location	Type	Completed (Note: The date given is the date used by Historic England as significant for the initial building or that of an important part in the structure's description.)	Date designated	Grid ref. (Note: The grid reference is based on the British national grid reference system, sometimes known as OSGB36, used by the Ordnance Survey.) Geo-coordinates	Entry number (Note: The "List Entry Number" is a unique number assigned to each listed building and scheduled monument by Historic England.)	Image
The Grange, 5 High Street	High Street, Stevenage	Local Government Office, formerly a Georgian coaching inn	c.1700 or earlier	18 February 1948	TL2328825491; 51°54′52″N 0°12′32″W	1348064	The Grange, 5 High Street More images
94–98 High Street	High Street, Stevenage	Hall House	16th century or earlier	30 September 1976	TL2337625044; 51°54′37″N 0°12′28″W	1101179	94–98 High Street
131 High Street	High Street, Stevenage	Timber Framed House	c1500 or earlier	18 February 1948	TL2349724922; 51°54′33″N 0°12′22″W	1176497	131 High Street More images
156, High Street	High Street, Stevenage	Timber Framed House	Early 16th century	10 April 1975	TL2345824745; 51°54′27″N 0°12′24″W	1101140	156, High Street More images
2, Letchmore Road	Letchmore Road Stevenage	Timber Framed House	Late 15th century or early 16th century	18 February 1948	TL2353624849; 51°54′31″N 0°12′20″W	1348095	2, Letchmore Road More images
The Old Bury	Rectory Lane, Stevenage	House	Late 16th century	18 February 1948	TL2400826243; 51°55′15″N 0°11′54″W	1348098	The Old Bury More images
Chells Manor	Chells, Stevenage	House	Late 14th century or early 15th century	24 November 1966	TL2667025295; 51°54′42″N 0°09′35″W	1101434	Chells Manor
Church of Saint Mary	Shephall Green, Stevenage	Church	C14-Early 15th century	18 February 1948	TL2567022959; 51°53′28″N 0°10′31″W	1101152	Church of Saint Mary More images
The Roebuck Hotel	Hertford Road, Stevenage	House	16th century	18 February 1948	TL2464222094; 51°53′01″N 0°11′26″W	1308083	The Roebuck Hotel More images
The Dairy, the Old Farmhouse and the Tudor House at Stebbing Farm	Fishers Green, Stevenage	Farmhouse	Late 15th century	30 September 1976	TL2232126215; 51°55′16″N 0°13′22″W	1175952	The Dairy, the Old Farmhouse and the Tudor House at Stebbing Farm
