= Mark E'Beyer =

English footballer

Personal information
- Date of birth: 21 September 1984 (age 42)
- Place of birth: Stevenage, England
- Position: Midfielder

Team information
- Current team: Wealdstone

Youth career
- 2001–2003: Watford

Senior career*
Years	Team	Apps	(Gls)
2003–2004	Wimbledon	0	(0)
2004	Stevenage Borough	0	(0)
2004–2006	Oxford United	16	(2)
2006	Hayes	?	(?)
2006–2007	Cambridge City	36	(2)
2007–2008	Wivenhoe Town	?	(1)
2008–2009	Hitchin Town	?	(?)
2009–2011	Wealdstone	1	(0)
- * Club domestic league appearances and goals as of 18 April 2011

Mark E'Beyer (born 21 September 1984) is an English former professional footballer who played for Isthmian League Premier Division side Wealdstone, where he played as a midfielder.
