= Henry Trigg (testator) =

English grocer whose body was kept in the roof of his house (1667–1724)

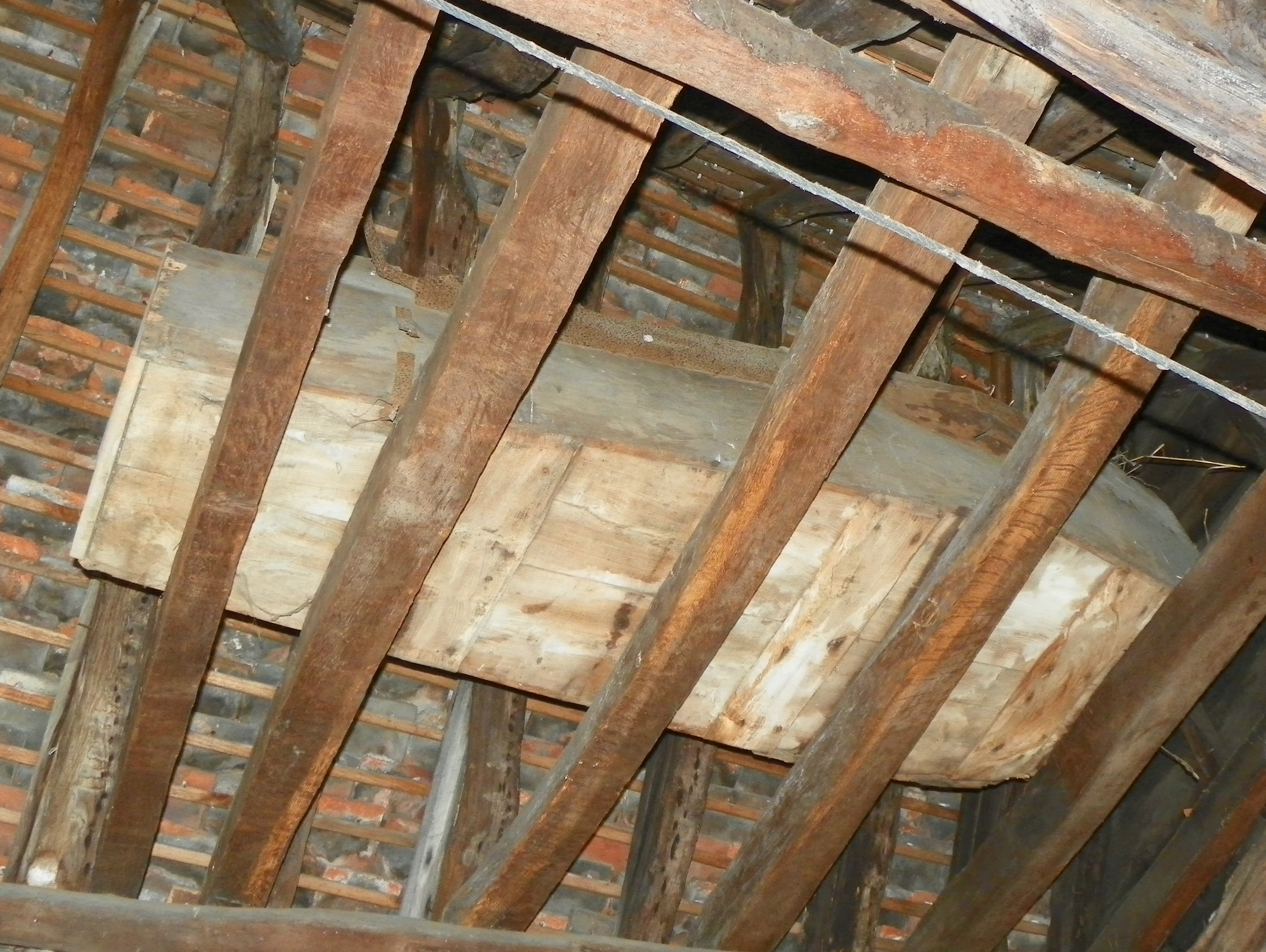
- Trigg's coffin in 2016
- Born: Stevenage, Hertfordshire, England
- Baptised: 11 January 1667
- Died: 6 October 1724 (aged 57); Letchworth, Hertfordshire, England
- Resting place: Barn at rear of 37 High Street, Stevenage
- Occupation: Grocer
- Known for: His eccentric will
- Parent(s): John and Sara Trigg
- Relatives: Revd Thomas Trigg (brother); George Trigg (brother); William Trigg (nephew)

Trigg's barn
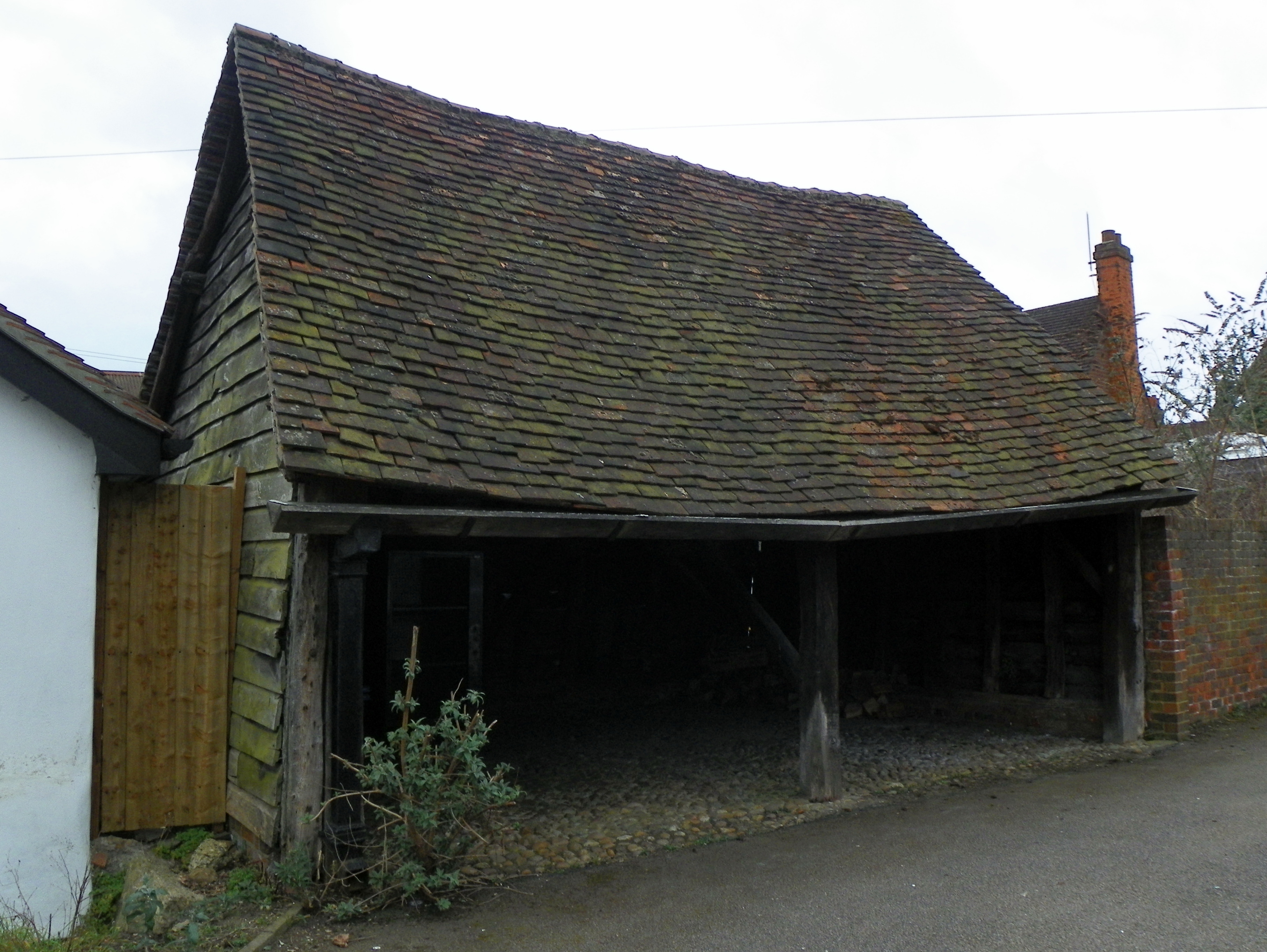
- The barn in 2016
- Interactive map of the Trigg's barn area

General information
- Type: Barn
- Location: Stevenage, Hertfordshire, England
- Coordinates: 51.911741°N 0.207653°W
- Named for: Henry Trigg
- Designations: Grade II listed building
- Known for: Resting place of Henry Trigg

Henry Trigg (c. 1667 – 6 October 1724) was an English grocer who became famous following his death for his eccentric will which had his body placed in a coffin in the rafters of his barn, which became a tourist attraction. Trigg later became the subject of a ghost story.

== Biography and legacy ==
Trigg was a prosperous grocer with a twin-gabled shop in Middle Row, Stevenage, Hertfordshire, as well as a number of other properties. He was a churchwarden, an overseer of the parish, and an important man locally. It is said that one night, he and two friends witnessed grave robbers at a local graveyard, and they vowed to make sure that this would not happen to them. Trigg stated in his will that his body should be committed for a minimum of 30 years to "the West end of my Hovel to be decently laid there upon a floor erected by my Executor, upon the purlin for the same purpose, nothing doubting but that at the general Resurrection, I shall receive the same again by the mighty power of God." According to Gentleman's Magazine of 5 February 1751, Trigg's will stated that he supposed that he would return to life after 30 years and then his estate would revert to him, and that he ordered that the barn be locked with the key inside his coffin so that he could let himself out. Shortly before he died, Trigg had negotiated with the parish authorities to rent his barn as the town's workhouse.

Trigg died in Letchworth, Hertfordshire on 6 October 1724 before renovations could be carried out on his barn. He never married, and his heir and executor was his brother the Reverend Thomas Trigg. The will stated that, if Thomas was reluctant to carry out the request, then everything bequeathed to him would go to their brother George Trigg or, if he refused, then to Trigg's nephew William Trigg. Therefore, his remains were placed in a lead-lined coffin of oak and pine and hoisted into the rafters of the barn behind the shop, about 10 feet (3.0 m) above the ground.

The coffin became a tourist attraction, and copies of the eccentric will were sold. It has been described as "a very unusual and possibly unique example of a coffin being placed above ground in the roof of a building", and Trigg was said to be "challenging priestly authority with this untraditional burial; it is a very early instance of a fear of grave robbing, which was a late-C18/C19 anxiety; and Trigg's eccentricity became the focus of a small cult of tourism." The will was also published under the title "Eccentric Will" in The Christian's Penny Magazine of 21 February 1835.

In 1769, Trigg's niece Ann died, leaving provisions in her will for Trigg's bones to be interred in a churchyard; but this never happened. In 1774, the house was converted into the Old Castle Inn, which used the coffin as a tourist attraction. There were several fires in the 19th century, most notably the Great Fire of 1807, but Trigg's barn and coffin survived. A carpenter is said to have stolen a tooth and some hair during repairs to the coffin in the early 1800s. In 1831, Mr Bellamy was landlord of the inn; he opened the coffin and reported that the hair on the skull was "in a perfect state of preservation". In the 19th century, the coffin was deteriorating so a new one was made, bound with iron bands, and Trigg's remains were returned to the rafters. In 1906, the East Herts Archaeological Society visited the coffin and reported "about two thirds of a male skeleton".

During World War I, Commonwealth soldiers billeted in Stevenage are reported to have stolen the bones. It was rumoured that the soldiers could be persuaded to part with the bones for a fee but supplemented the supply with the help of a local butcher. A letter to a local newspaper stated that in 1917, a resident went into the barn to look in the coffin and found horse bones. A nearby horse-riding school explained that copies of the will were still being sold and, if word got around that the coffin was empty, it could cause a drop in revenue.

In 1922, the licence for the Old Castle Inn was not renewed, and it became a branch of the National Westminster Bank.

In 1964, renovations were being carried out on a property in Middle Row, and a Fred Usher claimed to have seen a man about 5 feet 8 inches (1.73 m) tall, shabbily dressed in overcoat and gaiters, disappear through the solid brick wall in front of Trigg's barn. A reporter from the Nationwide TV show visited in 1975 but failed to get Trigg's ghost to appear, although the coffin, at least, was still in the barn's rafters. It is said that Trigg's ghost wanders the old house searching for his remains.

The coffin was temporarily removed in 1999 when the barn was refurbished and the owners, National Westminster Bank, demanded that any bones were removed. Some reports say that the coffin was found to be empty, though others state that the Letchworth undertakers who restored the coffin buried any remains. Trigg's plan had ultimately failed. A plaque was erected to commemorate the story.

Trigg's barn and his former home, now 37 High Street, Stevenage, are both Grade II listed buildings. The barn is noted for its 17th century frame and the fact that it survived as an outbuilding in the centre of Stevenage old town. The bank closed on 26 October 2015, leaving the property empty. It was sold at auction in May 2016 for £440,000 to Alliance Dental Ltd and was turned into a dental practice, with Stevenage Borough Council granting planning permission for internal and external alterations.
