= Albert and Ebenezer Fox =

19th-century English poachers

The Fox Twins as brick hod carriers

Albert Ebenezer Fox (1857 – 20 May 1937) and Ebenezer Albert Fox (1857 – 2 October 1926) were infamous English poachers who lived in Stevenage in the late 19th and early 20th centuries. They were identical twins and were also known as the Twin Foxes.

== Biography ==
They were born in 1857 in Symonds Green and named after the Ebenezer Chapel (Baptist Church) on Albert Street, of which their father, Henry Fox, was a devout supporter. Their mother, Charlotte Fox, was a straw-plait worker and their father farmed 10 acres (4 hectares) of land.

Despite their respectable background, the twins turned to a life of crime. They made sure never to go poaching together, and often escaped their frequent encounters with the constabulary by providing alibis for each other. Despite this, they did spend time in prison where they attracted the attention of Sir Edward Henry who used twins, including the Foxes, to prove that an individual could be identified by his fingerprints. Their crimes made national and international news.

Both twins ended their days in Chalkdell House (the Poor Law Union workhouse) in Hitchin. Ebenezer died on 2 October 1926, aged 68, and Albert died on 20 May 1937, aged 79. Both are buried in the churchyard of St Nicholas' Church, Stevenage.

== Legacy ==
In 1952, the Twin Foxes public house, named after the brothers, opened in the Bedwell area of Stevenage. It closed in 2012.

More recently in 1998, an estate of 59 properties in Woolmer Green, the other side of Knebworth from Stevenage was named Twin Foxes after Albert and Ebenezer Fox. Busts of both men rest on top of pillars at the entrance to the estate with years of birth and death.
