= Great Ashby =

Housing estate in Stevenage, Hertfordshire, England

Coordinates: 51.930°N 0.167°W

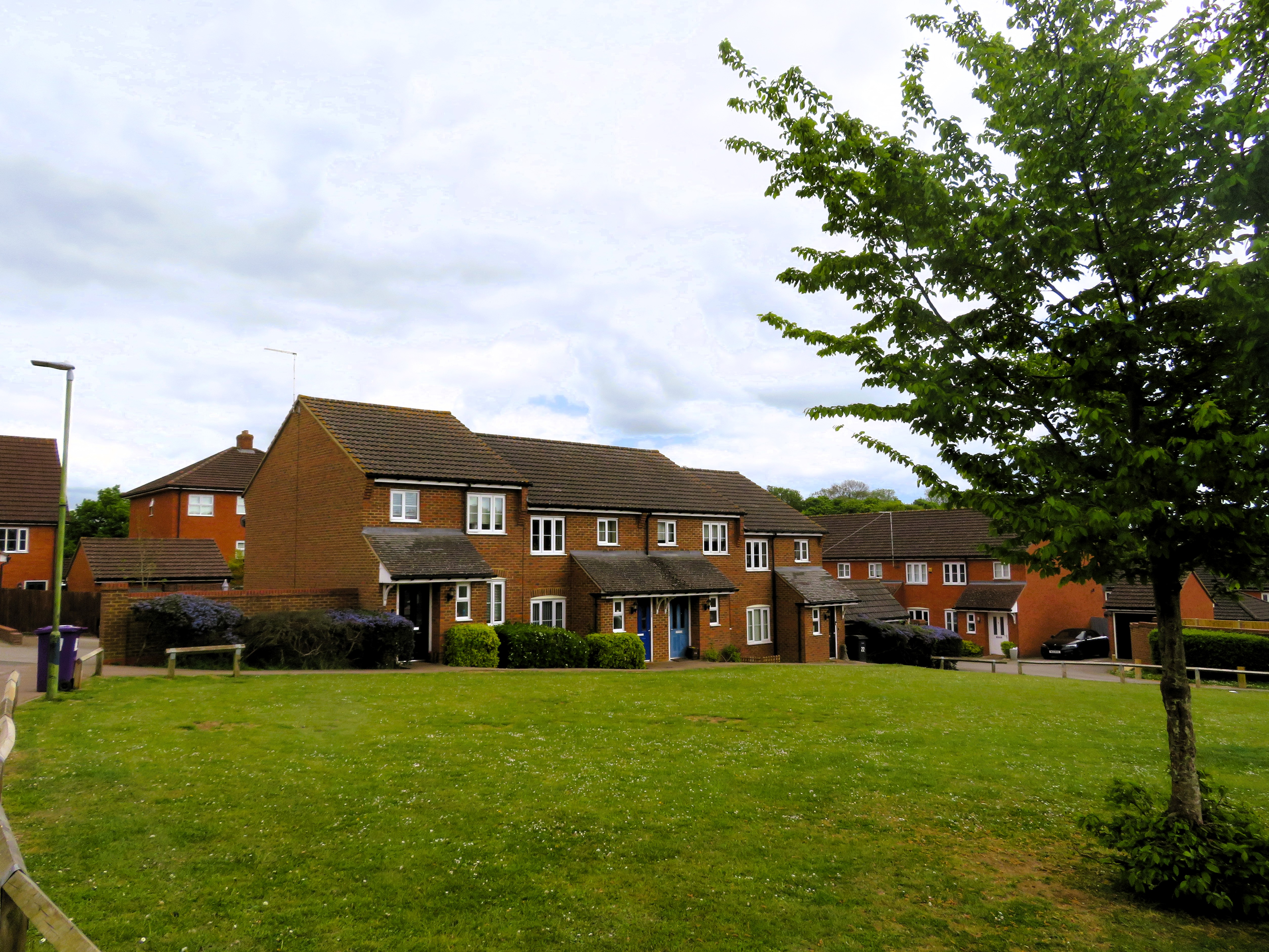
- Housing at Hunt Hill Close

- Location within Hertfordshire
- Population: 5,754 (Parish, 2021)
- Civil parish: Great Ashby
- District: North Hertfordshire
- Shire county: Hertfordshire
- Region: East
- Country: England
- Sovereign state: United Kingdom
- Post town: Stevenage
- Postcode district: SG1

Great Ashby is a housing estate and civil parish on the north-eastern edge of Stevenage in Hertfordshire, England. The estate forms part of the built-up area of Stevenage, and straddles the boundary between the borough of Stevenage and the neighbouring district of North Hertfordshire. The civil parish just covers the part of the estate in North Hertfordshire. At the 2021 census the parish had a population of 5,754.

== History ==
The name Great Ashby was coined in the 1990s to apply to an area of new housing development on the north-eastern edge of the urban area of Stevenage. The development was partly within the borough of Stevenage and partly in the district of North Hertfordshire. The estate was developed primarily in the late 1990s and early 2000s, and includes a neighbourhood centre with facilities including shops, a community hall and a primary school (Round Diamond).

A Great Ashby civil parish was created on 1 April 2011 covering the parts of Great Ashby which were within the parish of Graveley in North Hertfordshire. The area of the parish was enlarged a year later on 1 April 2012 to also include an area from the parish of Weston in North Hertfordshire.

== Governance ==
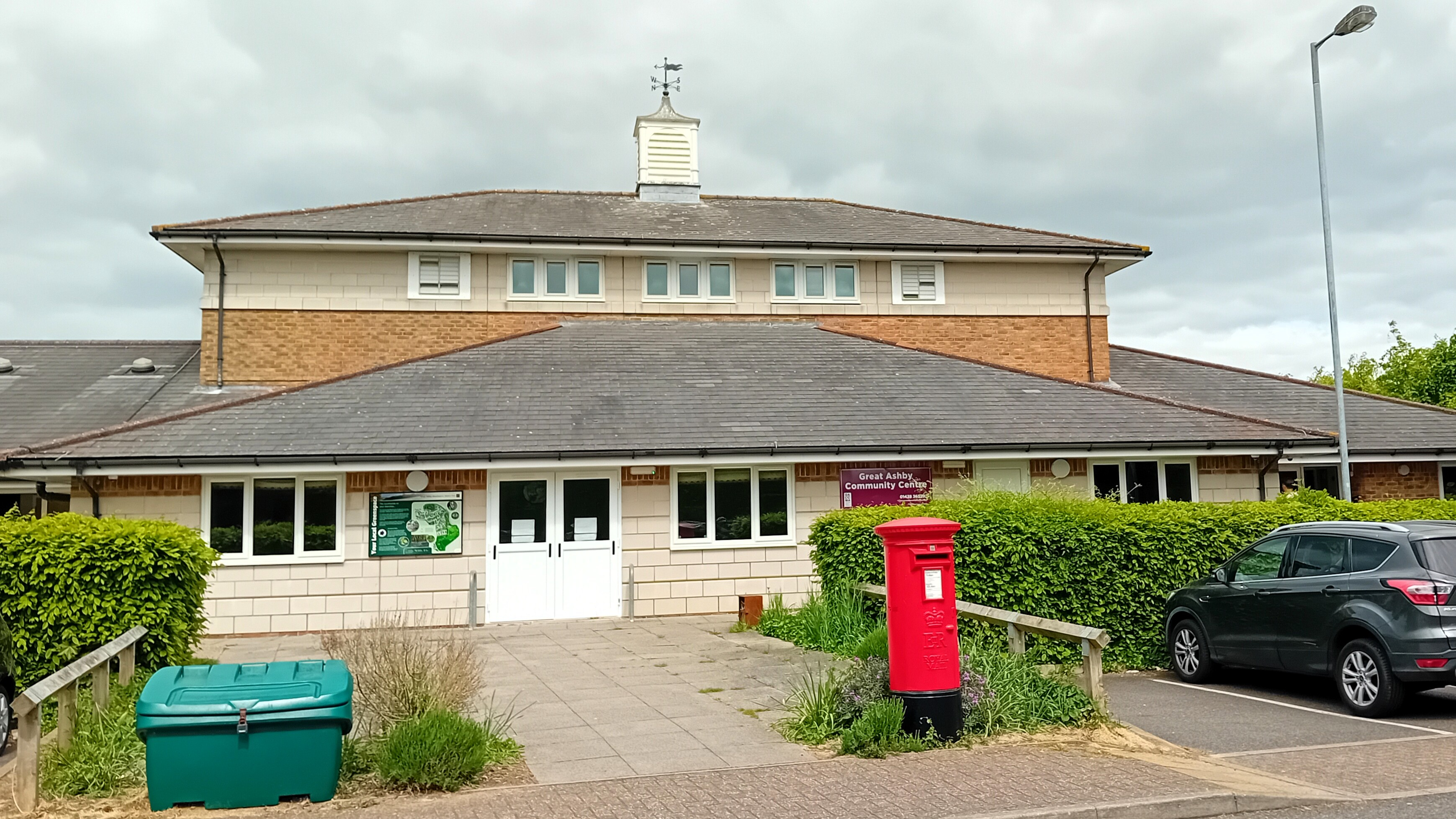
Community Centre, Whitehorse Lane

There are three tiers of local government covering the civil parish of Great Ashby, at parish (community), district and county level: Great Ashby Community Council, North Hertfordshire District Council, and Hertfordshire County Council. The community council meets at the community centre on Whitehorse Lane.

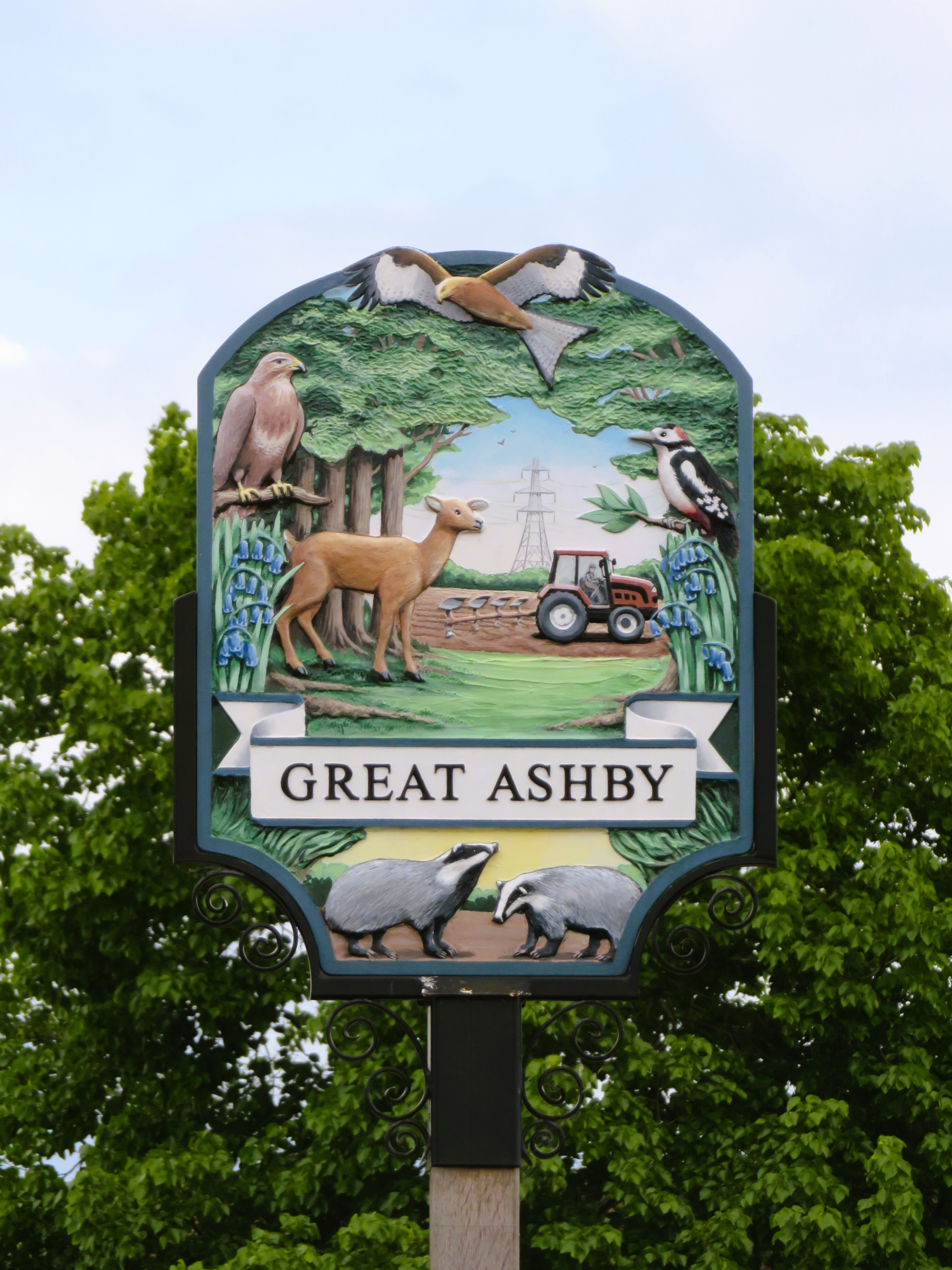
Community sign on Great Ashby Way / Whitehorse Lane roundabout
