= The Life to Come =

The Life to Come may refer to:

- The Life to Come (short story), a 1922 short story by E. M. Forster
- The Life to Come (and Other Stories), a 1972 short story collection by E. M. Forster
- The Life to Come (novel), a 2017 novel by Michelle de Kretser
- Life to Come, a song by The Killers from the album Wonderful Wonderful
