= What I Believe =

What I Believe may refer to:

- What I Believe (Tolstoy book), 1885
- "What I Believe" (E. M. Forster essay), 1938
- "What I Believe", a 1925 essay by Bertrand Russell
- "What I Believe", by Skillet from Rise, 2013
