= Gates of horn and ivory =

Literary image, originally from Greek

The gates of horn and ivory are a literary image used to distinguish true dreams (corresponding to factual occurrences) from false. The phrase originated in the Greek language, in which the word for "horn" is similar to that for "fulfill" and the word for "ivory" is similar to that for "deceive" (see Murray, below). On the basis of that play on words, true dreams are spoken of as coming through the gates of horn, false dreams as coming through those of ivory.

== The Odyssey ==
The earliest appearance of the image is in the Odyssey, book 19, lines 560–569. There Penelope, who has had a dream that seems to signify that her husband Odysseus is about to return, expresses by a play on words her conviction that the dream is false. She says:

Stranger, dreams verily are baffling and unclear of meaning, and in no wise do they find fulfillment in all things for men. For two are the gates of shadowy dreams, and one is fashioned of horn and one of ivory. Those dreams that pass through the gate of sawn ivory deceive men, bringing words that find no fulfillment. But those that come forth through the gate of polished horn bring true issues to pass, when any mortal sees them. But in my case it was not from thence, methinks, that my strange dream came.

Arthur T. Murray, translator of the original Loeb Classical Library edition of the Odyssey, commented:

The play upon the words κέρας, "horn", and κραίνω, "fulfill", and upon ἐλέφας, "ivory", and ἐλεφαίρομαι, "deceive", cannot be preserved in English.

== Echoes in later Greek literature ==
Homer greatly influenced Greek literature as a whole. Plato refers to the two gates in his dialogue Charmides:

Socrates: "Listen then," I said, "to my dream, to see whether it comes through horn or through ivory."

A reference to the Odyssean image also appears in the late (c. AD 400) epic poet Nonnus:

As Morrheus slept, the vision of a dream cajoled him,
beguiling his mind after flitting through the gates of ivory.

== The Aeneid ==
Virgil borrowed the image of the two gates in lines 893–898 of Book 6 of his Aeneid, describing that of horn as the passageway for true shades and that of ivory as that through which the Manes in the underworld send false dreams up to the living. Through the latter gate Virgil makes his hero Aeneas, accompanied by the Cumaean Sibyl, return from his visit to the underworld, where he has met, among others, his dead father Anchises:

There are twin Gates of Sleep. One, they say, is called the Gate of Horn and it offers easy passage to all true shades. The other glistens with ivory, radiant, flawless, but through it the dead send false dreams up toward the sky. And here Anchises, his vision told in full, escorts his son and Sibyl both and shows them out now through the Ivory Gate.

Why Virgil has Aeneas return through the ivory gate (whence pass deluding lies) and not through that of horn is uncertain. One theory is that it refers to the time of night at which he returned. Jorge Luis Borges accepted the view that, for Virgil, what we call reality is not in fact such; that Virgil may have considered the Platonic world of the archetypes to be the real world.

Another explanation is that Virgil is thus indicating that what he has recounted is not to be taken as literal fact. In John Wesley's last sermon, preached on 17 January 1791, he spoke of how uncertain even the best conjectures about the invisible world were without revelation: "The most finished of all these accounts, is that of the great Roman poet. Where observe how warily he begins, with that apologetic preface, – Sit mihi fas audita loqui – 'May I be allowed to tell what I have heard'. And, in the conclusion, lest anyone should imagine he believed any of these accounts, he sends the relater of them out of hades by the ivory gate, through which, he had just informed us, that only dreams and shadows pass, – a very plain intimation, that all which has gone before, is to be looked upon as a dream!"

Alternatively, the ivory gate could represent Virgil's reservations about the glorification of empire. Bartsch states that in the Aeneid, "ivory, the material for much Virgilian and Augustan art, is rich with possibilities for deception of a particularly artistic kind ... Aeneas' exit from the Underworld through the ivory gates of false dreams casts an ominous pall over the Aeneid's own artistic message and in particular over the ideologically laden scenes in the Underworld."

== Other Latin writing ==
In his poem Silvae, a lament for his dead father, the poet Publius Papinius Statius wishes that his father may come to him from the abode of the dead in the form of a true dream, passing therefore through the gate of horn:

Thence mayst thou pass to where the better gate of horn o'ercomes the envious ivory, and in the semblance of a dream teach me what thou wert wont to teach.(V.iii.285–290)

In his "Cupid Crucified", 4th century AD Latin poet Ausonius ends the poem by saying that Cupid escapes through the gate of ivory (portaque evadit eburna), thus implying that the poem's depiction of Cupid's crucifixion was a false dream.

The 15th-century Latin poet Basinio of Parma, employed at the court of Sigismondo Malatesta in Rimini, wrote a panegyric epic poem for his prince, titled Hesperis, modelled largely on the Aeneid and the Homeric epics, in which Sigismondo, as epic hero, undertakes a journey to the underworld in order to meet his deceased father Pandolfo Malatesta. Before that he passes the temple of Fama, which has a bipartite gate — one half made of horn, one half of ivory. On the ivory half are depicted not only Sigismondo's descent but also those of Hercules, Theseus, Ulysses, and Aeneas.

Having seen that, they turn towards the astounding temple of Fame, a temple enormous and imposing in size and shape, whose door on its left side is white from ivory steps with shining horn on the other half. Disturbing nightmares are conveyed by false rumour on the vain gates of ivory, while true dreams of horn are sent by trustworthy rumours. The gate of horn shows the Spaniards defeated on the Tyrrhenian shore [i.e. Sigismondo's victory over Alfonso V's troops at Piombino in 1448]. On the ivory steps Sigismondo turns toward the sea, and is swimming after his ship is destroyed [on his way to the island where he is to undertake his trip to the underworld]. There Theseus and also Hercules made their way: there brave and victorious Ulysses went to the gloomy homes of the Cimmerians; there faithful Aeneas took to the Stygian lake Avernus.

== English writing ==
The gates of horn and ivory appear in the following notable English written works:

- David Gemmell's epic novel Troy: Lord of the Silver Bow, chapter sixteen. This is referenced when Odysseus talks to Xander about his vision of the future, and what his wife Penelope had taught him about dreams and their gates in the past.
- Edmund Spenser's epic poem The Faerie Queene (1590, English) in book 1, stanzas XL and XLIV, in reference to a false dream being brought to the hero (Prince Arthur/the Knight of the Red Crosse).
- Alexander Pope's mock-epic The Dunciad (1743), in Book III: "And thro' the Iv'ry Gate the Vision flies."
- E. R. Eddison's romance The Worm Ouroboros (1922), in Chapter 2: "...belike the dream was a true dream, sent thee through the gate of horn".
- E. M. Forster's short story "The Other Side of the Hedge". The reference from Forster comes when the main character of the story observes the two gates; "The Other Side of the Hedge" is usually read as a metaphor of death and Heaven.
- A. A. Milne's three-act play The Ivory Door is a condemnation of religious dogma and false belief.
- T.S. Eliot's poem "Sweeney Among the Nightingales". The line "And Sweeney guards the horned gate" is likewise a reference to this image.
- Eliot's poem "Ash-Wednesday". The lines "And the blind eye creates / The empty forms between the ivory gates" similarly refer to this concept.
- William Empson's poem "Letter III": "...offspring of Heaven first born, | Earth's terra firma, the Hell-Gate of Horn"
- H. P. Lovecraft's short story "Celephaïs" alludes to the gates of ivory as the portal through which children see the world of wonder, which their adult minds, made wise and unhappy by knowledge of the real world, will reject as fanciful.
- Ursula K. Le Guin's novel A Wizard of Earthsea.
- Robert Holdstock's novel Gate of Ivory, Gate of Horn. The main character grapples with a traumatic event that has two very different manifestations, one true and one false.
- Derek Mahon's poem "Homage to Malcolm Lowry". "Lighting-blind, you, tempest-torn / At the poles of our condition, did not confuse / The Gates of Ivory with the Gates of Horn."
- Margaret Drabble's novel The Gates of Ivory.
- W.H. Auden's poem "Prime" in Horae Canonicae.
- Seamus Heaney's poem "To a Dutch Potter in Ireland" in The Spirit Level: "Then I entered a strongroom of vocabulary / Where words like urns that had come through the fire / Stood in their bone-dry alcoves next a kiln // And came away changed, like the guard who'd seen / The stone move in a diamond-blaze of air / Or the gates of horn behind the gates of clay."
- Lord Dunsany's poem "The Gate of Horn" in his 1940 book War Poems. The poem is about leaving his native Ireland and its false dream of neutrality in WW2 to volunteer in Kent to fight the Germans if they invade, and the hope of a true dream of victory.
- The Ivory Gate, a novel by Walter Besant, describing a solicitor with a split personality. The utopian thoughts of his alter ego are said to occur "before the Ivory Gate".
- Frank Bidart's long poem "The First Hour of the Night" makes use of both the gates of ivory and horn to question certainty in fact and memory.
- The gates are also depicted as part of the Dream world in the graphic novel "The Sandman" by Neil Gaiman.
- The inspiration for the title of the Star Trek: Deep Space Nine novel "Horn and Ivory".

== Music ==
Various metal bands have referenced the image, including in songs on Legacy of Kings, No Exit, Eye of Providence, and by Jesus Piece.

== Software ==
- The neural-net library Keras, developed as part of project ONEIROS, is named in reference to the gate of horn (κέρας).
