= Epipsychidion =

Poem by Percy Bysshe Shelley

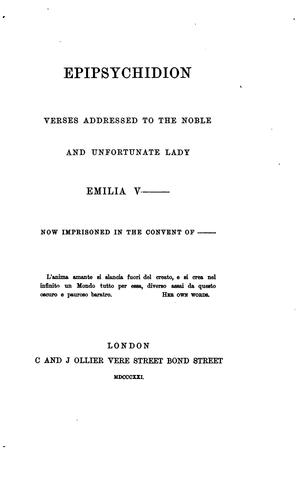
1821 title page, Charles and James Ollier, London

Epipsychidion is a major poetical work published in 1821 by Percy Bysshe Shelley. The work was subtitled Verses addressed to the noble and unfortunate Lady Emilia V—, now imprisoned in the convent of —. The title is Greek for "concerning or about a little soul", from epi, "around", "about"; and psychidion, "little soul".

The poem is an exploration of ideal love, Platonism, and the soul's search for its "corresponding antitype", a spiritual union. It advocates for free love over conventional marriage.

Emilia Viviani is imprisoned in a convent by her father in Pisa, Italy to force her into an arranged marriage. Shelley attacked this as "paternalistic tyranny" and sought to obtain her release. He saw her as a "noble and unfortunate lady" who was the victim of unjust societal conventions and laws.

== Background ==
Countess Teresa Viviani, the daughter of the governor of Pisa, was nineteen years old. Her father had placed her in the Convent of Saint Anna. Shelley had visited her several times and had corresponded with her briefly. After the work was published by Charles and James Ollier in London, Shelley asked them to withdraw it. One possible concern was that readers would interpret the poem biographically. Shelley referred to it as "an idealized history of my life and feelings". The poem contains autobiographical elements, consisting of 604 lines written for Viviani, whom Shelley met while she was "imprisoned" in 1820.

The theme of the work is a meditation on the nature of ideal love. Shelley advocates free love, criticising conventional marriage, which he described as "the weariest and the longest journey". Epipsychidion opens with an invocation to Emilia as a spiritual sister of the speaker. He addresses her as a "captive bird" for whose nest his poem will be soft rose petals. He calls her an angel of light, the light of the moon seen through mortal clouds, a star beyond all storms.

In a letter of 18 June 1822, Shelley described the work:

The Epipsychidion I cannot look at; the person whom it celebrates was a cloud instead of a Juno; and poor Ixion starts from the Centaur that was the offspring of his own embrace. If you are curious, however, to hear what I am and have been, it will tell you something thereof. It is an idealized history of my life and feelings. I think one is always in love with something or other; the error, and I confess it is not easy for spirits cased in flesh and blood to avoid it, consists in seeking in a mortal image the likeness of what is, perhaps, eternal.

Epipsychidion was composed at Pisa, in January and February 1821, and was published anonymously in 1821 by Charles and James Ollier, London. The poem was included by Mary Shelley in the Poetical Works in 1839, both editions. The Bodleian Library has a first draft of Epipsychidion, "consisting of three versions, more or less complete, of the 'Preface [Advertisement]'; a version in ink and pencil, much cancelled, of the last eighty lines of the poem; and some additional lines which did not appear in print". Harry Buxton Forman reprinted the 1821 edition.

Shelley informed his publisher Charles Ollier that he wanted Epipsychidion to be circulated only to the sunetoi, the initiated, the cognoscenti, the enlightened, the "esoteric few".

The epigraph on the title page reads in Italian as Her Own Words : "L'anima amante si slancia fuori del creato, e si crea nell' infinito un Mondo tutto per essa, diverso assai da questo oscuro e pauroso baratro." "The loving soul leaps out of creation and creates for itself in the infinite a world entirely for itself, very different from this dark and fearful abyss."

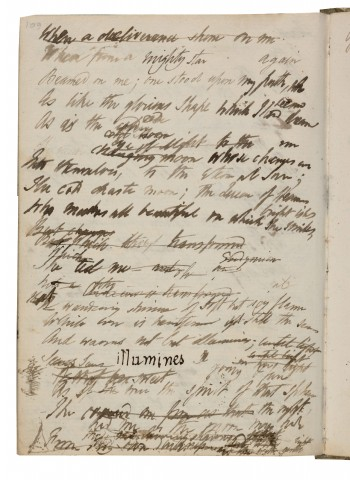
1820–21 draft of Epipsychidion, Bodleian Library, Oxford

== Characters ==
- Emilia Viviani or "Emily": The "noble and unfortunate lady", imprisoned at the convent in Pisa, regarded by Shelley as the ideal or perfect woman.
- The Speaker or Narrator: Represents Percy Bysshe Shelley who regards Emily as a spiritual sister or a "soul within our soul".
- The Wife or Allegorical "Moon": Represents Shelley's wife Mary, who is invited into the idealized, spiritual relationship with Emily.
- The "Comet": Represents Claire Clairmont, Mary’s stepsister who lived with them.
- The "One" Untrue Planet: Represents Shelley's first wife, Harriet Westbrook.

== Summary ==
In Epipsychidion Shelley addresses Emilia Viviani, a young woman imprisoned in a convent using Platonic terms. He regards her as an ideal spiritual counterpart to himself, a "soul within the soul". He envisions an escape to an idyllic and utopian island to live in free love and to reject the traditional marriage accepted in society.

He begins with an invocation and idealization. Shelley addresses Emilia as a "captive bird" and an "angel of light", perceiving her as an "Epipsychidion" or as a little soul or the soul within the soul. She is the "corresponding antitype" to his own soul:

"Poor captive bird! who, from thy narrow cage,
Pourest such music, that it might assuage
The rugged hearts of those who prisoned thee,
Were they not deaf to all sweet melody;
This song shall be thy rose: its petals pale
Are dead, indeed, my adored Nightingale!"

Shelley advocates for free love, attacking the "paternalistic tyranny" of her father who has imprisoned her in a nunnery to force her into an arranged marriage. This is similar to his attack on Count Francesco Cenci who treated his daughter Beatrice in a similar way in his 1819 drama The Cenci. He gives her his spiritual devotion and seeks to free her from her confinement.

The poem depicts an imaginary escape or refuge to a paradise, a Utopian island with "Ionian skies", a "far Eden of the purple East", a "delicious isle" where they can "love one another completely": "It is an isle under Ionian skies/Beautiful as a wreck of Paradise". Unlike a civil marriage, on the island they will have the "sweetest union", a perfect match which will mesh or blend their spirits or souls into a unity, "one Spirit within two frames" and "one passion in twin-hearts" where they become "like two meteors of expanding flame" that merge: "We shall become the same, we shall be one/Spirit within two frames, oh! wherefore two?"

Shelley proposes a philosophy of love based on "free love" where the sole possession of the other is not necessary because "to divide is not to take away": "True Love in this differs from gold and clay,/That to divide is not to take away". He regards conventional or civil marriage as a restrictive or inhibiting institution, which he likens to forced servitude or slavery. He concludes that marriage is "the weariest and the longest journey": "With one chained friend, perhaps a jealous foe/The dreariest and the longest journey go".

In conclusion, Shelley makes a concession about the limitations of language, that his feelings and emotions cannot be fully and adequately expressed in words: "The winged words on which my soul would pierce/Into the height of love's rare Universe,/Are chains of lead around its flight of fire". Finally, he expresses his longing for union, "for one life, one death", "One hope within two wills", "one immortality":

"We shall become the same, we shall be one
Spirit within two frames, oh! wherefore two?
One passion in twin-hearts, which grows and grew."

== Legacy ==
E. M. Forster's second novel, The Longest Journey (1907), takes its title from a line from the poem, marriage is the "dreariest and the longest journey".

== Sources ==
- Brown, Richard E. "The Role of Dante in Epipsychidion". Comparative Literature, Vol. 30, No. 3, Summer, 1978.
- Cameron, Kenneth Neil. "The Planet-Tempest Passage in Epipsychidion." PMLA, 63 (1948), 950–72.
- Gelpi, Barbara Charlesworth. Keeping faith with Desire: A Reading of 'Epipsychidion'. Edinburgh: Edinburgh UP, 1996.
- Goslee, Nancy Moore. "Dispersoning Emily: Drafting as Plot in Epipsychidion." Keats-Shelley Journal, Vol. 42, 1993.
- Haekel, Ralf. "Towards the Soul: Percy Bysshe Shelley's 'Epipsychidion'." European Romantic Review 22.5 (2011): 667-684.
- Hughes, D.J. "Coherence and Collapse in Shelley, With Particular Reference to Epipsychidion." ELH, Vol. 28, No. 3, September 1961.
- Jones, Frederick L. "Two Notes on Epipsychidion". Modern Language Notes, Vol. 50, No. 1 (January 1935), p. 40.
- Klopper, Dirk. (1986). "Repetition and death in Shelley’s ‘Epipsychidion’: A post‐structuralist reading." Journal of Literary Studies, 2(2), 57–64. https://doi.org/10.1080/02564718608529793
- Lauritsen, John. “Hellenism and Homoeroticism in Shelley and his Circle”. The Journal of Homosexuality, Volume 49, Numbers 3/4, 2005.
- McConnell, Frank. "Shelleyan 'Allegory": Epipsychidion." Keats-Shelley Journal, Volume XX (1971), pp. 100–112.
- McDayter, Ghislaine. "'O'er Leaping the Bounds': The Sexing of the Creative Soul in Shelley's Epipsychidion." Keats-Shelley Journal 52 (2003): 26.
- Péter, Agnes. "A Hermeneutical Reading of 'Epipsychidion'." Keats-Shelley Journal 42 (1993): 120-127.
- Pinch, Adela. "Romantic Passions: Thinking about the Other in Romantic Love". Romantic Circles. Praxis Series. Web link: http://www.rc.umd.edu/praxis/passions/pinch/pinch.html
- O'Neill, Michael. "Shelley's Epipsychidion: The Before Unapprehended Relations of Things". Essays in Criticism, (1987) XXXVII (2): 135–157.
- Schulze, Earl. "The Dantean Quest of Epipsychidion." Studies in Romanticism, Vol. 21, No. 2, Summer, 1982.
- Shanke, Cao. "Epipsychidion: Shelley’s Meditation on Platonic Love." 文学跨学科研究 3 (2017): 100.
- Shih, Terence H.W. "Shelley's Quest for Love: Queering Epipsychidion. Romanticism on the Net. #72-73 (Spring-Fall 2019). Retrieved 17 January 2026.
- Sperry, Stuart M. "Love's Universe: Epipsychidion." In Shelley, pp. 152-175. Routledge, 2014.
- Symonds, John Addington. Shelley. New Edition. English Men of Letters series, edited by John Morley. London: Macmillan, 1887. Originally published in 1878.
- Ulmer, William. Shelleyan Eros: The Rhetoric of Romantic Love. Princeton: Princeton University Press, 1990.
- Vatalaro, Paul A. Shelley's Music: Fantasy, Authority, and the Object Voice. Farnham, Surrey, UK: Ashgate, 2009.
- Verma, K.D. The Vision of "love's rare universe": A Study of Shelley's Epipsychidion. Lanham, MD: University Press of America, 1995.
- Warren, Andrew. "'Unentangled Intermixture': Love and Materialism in Shelley's Epipsychidion." Keats-Shelley Journal, 2010.
- Weinberg, Alan M. "Emilia Viviani and Shelley’s ‘Vita Nuova’: Epipsychidion." In Shelley’s Italian Experience, pp. 135-172. London: Palgrave Macmillan UK, 1991.
- Wroe, Ann. Being Shelley: The Poet's Search for Himself. Pantheon, 2007.
