= Philip Whichelo =

British painter (1905–1989)

Philip Whichelo (1905–1989) was a British painter and set designer. He lived in Putney, a district in south-west London, England, located in the London Borough of Wandsworth. He was the maternal cousin of the renowned English writer and librettist, Edward Morgan Forster. Letters between Philip Whichelo and E. M. Forster survive in ‘’The Papers of Edward Morgan Forster’’ held at King's College Archive Centre, Cambridge, which includes correspondence between the two, as well as family postcards. Philip Whichelo is recorded as having donated a portrait of E. M. Forster to the Gay and Lesbian Humanist Association.

While painting was his passion and pastime, Whichelo supported himself as a set designer for the London-based Gateway Theatre Club, London. Some of his notable works follow:

- Designer, The Judge’s Will, by Quill, Del Sarto Company started 26 May 1956, New Gateway.
- Designer, Marshall’s Aid 1949–1950, Gateway Theatre, London.
- Designer, Murder Happens 1949–1950, Gateway Theatre, London.
- Designer, Lady Inger of Ostraat 1946, Gateway Theatre, London

His paintings have been sold in English auction houses including WH Lane & Son, David Lay, and Hartleys Auctioneers and Valuers, and the last publicized exhibition of his works was in 1998 at Tony Saunders Gallery, Penzance.
