= Two Cheers for Democracy =

1951 essay collection by E. M. Forster

Abinger Harvest
- Author: E.M. Forster
- Language: English
- Genre: Non-fiction
- Publication date: 1951
- Publication place: United Kingdom

Two Cheers for Democracy is the second collection of essays by E. M. Forster, published in 1951, and incorporating material from 1936 onwards.

Reflecting Forster's increasing politicisation in the 1930s, particularly in the first section entitled 'The Second Darkness', the collection contains versions of his anti-Nazi broadcasts of 1940, as well as his defence of individualism as "a liberal who has found liberalism crumbling beneath him" in the face of the rise of totalitarianism.

== Themes ==
The collection was arranged thematically, not chronologically, with the political first section followed by a second, more cultural part, 'What I Believe', containing Forster's reflection on art in general, as well as on particular artists ranging from John Skelton to Syed Ross Masood.

Part One saw Forster struggling to articulate his quiet liberalism, and his concern for the individual, in the face not only of continental totalitarianism, but also of both right-wing xenophobia and left-wing extremism at home. The book's title comes from the end of the sixth paragraph of "What I Believe" Seen widely as out-of-step and ineffective at the time, his writings have perhaps worn better than many of Forster's more strident counterpart: Stanley Cavell, for example, praised him a half-century later for the honesty of his concrete efforts to weigh up the competing ethical claims of public and private spheres, country and friends.

In Part Two, Forster both enunciated and exemplified his belief in the arts and culture as an (inner) ordering principle in life - providing it with a celebratory sense of meaning. As he himself put it:

I have found by experience that the arts act as an antidote against our present troubles, and also as a support to our common humanity.

== Editions ==
- — (1951). Two cheers for democracy (First American ed.). New York: Harcourt, Brace and Company. ASIN B0CQQ5TD2N. LCCN 51013652. OCLC 364466. GoodReads:129837888. xvi, 363 pages. Blank grey hardcover with blue book jacket.
- — (1951). Two cheers for democracy. London: Edward Arnold & Co. ASIN B0000CI23K. ISBN 978-1-125-90738-2. LCCN 52037988. OCLC 3219023. GoodReads:36013867. 371 pages. ISBN assigned by University of Michigan Library. Cover image.
- — (1962). Two cheers for democracy. A Harvest Book. New York: Harcourt, Brace & World, Inc. OCLC 365419. xvi, 363 pages. Exclamation cover.
- — (24 January 1962). Two cheers for democracy. A Harvest Book. New York: Mariner Books. ISBN 978-0-15-692025-4. OCLC 1465114670. GoodReads:1082394. GoodReads:46045811. 384 pages. Exclamation cover.
- — (1965). Two cheers for democracy. Penguin Books. GoodReads:32890292. 365 pages. Abstract art cover.
- — (1965). Two cheers for democracy. Harmondsworth: Penguin Books. ISBN 978-0-14-002362-6. OCLC 12036724. 366 pages. Caricature cover.
- — (1972). Two cheers for democracy. The Abinger edition of E.M. Forster. Vol. 11. London: Edward Arnold. ISBN 978-0-7131-5658-4. LCCN 73175130. OCLC 752526. xiv, 409 pages. Purple cover.
- — (1977). Two cheers for democracy. A Harvest Book. San Diego: Harcourt Brace and Company. ISBN 978-0-15-692025-4. xii, 363 pages. Exclamation cover.
- — (1977). Two cheers for democracy. A Harvest Book. San Diego: Harcourt Brace Jovanovich. ISBN 978-0-15-692394-1. OCLC 13285280. xvi, 363 pages. Note: ISBN is also used for another work.
- — (28 February 1978). Two cheers for democracy. The Abinger edition of E.M. Forster. Vol. 11. New York: Holmes & Meier. ISBN 978-0-8419-5808-1. OCLC 9548685. xiv, 409 pages.
- — (20 March 2023). Two cheers for democracy. Persephone Books. ISBN 978-1-910263-36-5.
- — (2024). Two cheers for democracy (PDF). Tel Aviv: IWP Books. xii, 442 pages.

== See also ==
- Bloomsbury Group
- Hogarth Press
- Mrs. Miniver
- The London Library
- Poet as legislator
- Principia Ethica
- Toleration
- What I Believe (E. M. Forster essay)
