= The Classical Annex =

Short story by E. M. Forster

"The Classical Annex" is a short story by E. M. Forster published posthumously in 1972. In the story, a young sports enthusiast named Denis, alone in a museum, finds himself in the grip of a marble wrestler, after he is supernaturally incorporated into a Roman sculpture called The Wrestling Lesson.
