= The Celestial Omnibus =

Collection of short stories by E. M. Forster

- Cover of the first edition
- Author: E. M. Forster
- Language: English
- Genre: Fantasy
- Publisher: Sidgwick & Jackson
- Publication date: 1911
- Publication place: United Kingdom
- Media type: Print (hardback)
- Pages: 165

The Celestial Omnibus and Other Stories is the title of a collection of short stories by English writer E. M. Forster, first published in 1911. It contains stories written over the previous ten years, and together with the collection The Eternal Moment (1928) forms part of Forster's Collected Short Stories (1947).

== Contents ==
The Celestial Omnibus contains:

- "The Story of a Panic"
- "The Other Side of the Hedge"
- "The Celestial Omnibus"
- "Other Kingdom"
- "The Curate's Friend"
- "The Road from Colonus"
