= The Other Side of the Hedge =

- Short story by E. M. Forster

Text available at Wikisource
- Genre: Narrative short story

Publication

"The Other Side of the Hedge" is a 1911 allegorical sketch by E. M. Forster, included in the same year's short story collection The Celestial Omnibus.

== Plot ==
The story is a dreamlike first-person narrative by an unnamed young man who has just turned twenty-five, and who has spent his entire life walking down a narrow path or road bounded by two tall hedges of dead, thorny shrubbery. He is determined to advance along the road, and to make good time doing so, a goal which he considers a mark of his commitment to progress and modernity; he keeps close track of his progress with the aid of a pedometer (which is, curiously, denominated in years instead of miles.) The narrator briefly reflects on the fact that he has tried to outpace every other person he has met on the path, and that he has not slowed for another person since he abandoned his brother, who had disappointed him by wasting time singing and stopping to help others. The narrator grows exhausted from walking, sits on a milestone to catch his breath, collapses, and in a daze drags himself through the thorny hedge. On the other side of the hedge, he unexpectedly falls into a water-filled moat, from which he is pulled by an older man. He discovers that the landscape on the other side of the hedge is pleasant and bucolic, with green rolling hills and fields inhabited by people who do not compete with one another and are not in a hurry to get anywhere. The narrator (who discovers his pedometer has stopped) interacts with the people politely, but is discreetly repelled by their lack of purpose: he attempts to explain to them that the path is the only worthwhile goal in life, and that it represents humanity's highest aspirations toward advancement and self-realization, even though he admits he does not know where the path ultimately leads. The older man shows him to a gate of translucent horn in the hedge, and the increasingly conflicted narrator expresses a determination to return to the road, but - at the last possible instant - desists, and lays down in a meadow and falls asleep. In his last moment of wakefulness he recognizes the brother he once left behind on the road.
