= The Eternal Moment =

Short story collection by E. M. Forster

- Dust jacket of the first edition
- Author: E. M. Forster
- Language: English
- Genre: Fantasy; Science fiction
- Publisher: Sidgwick & Jackson
- Publication date: 1928
- Publication place: United Kingdom
- Media type: Print (hardback)
- Pages: 185 pp

The Eternal Moment and Other Stories is the title of a collection of short stories by E. M. Forster, first published in 1928 by Sidgwick & Jackson. It contains stories written between about 1903 and 1914. Together with the stories contained in The Celestial Omnibus (1911), it was collected as Forster's Collected Short Stories in 1947. All of the included material deals with science fiction or supernatural themes, except for the title story, which includes several elements (English travelers in southern Europe, an interrupted moment of passion on a mountaintop) that would later be revisited in Forster's novel A Room with a View.

The collection bears the dedication: "To T. E. in the absence of anything else."

== Contents ==
- "The Machine Stops"
- "The Point of It"
- "Mr. Andrews"
- "Co-ordination"
- "The Story of the Siren"
- "The Eternal Moment"
