= The Longest Journey (novel) =

1907 novel by E. M. Forster

- First edition
- Author: E. M. Forster
- Language: English
- Genre: Autobiographical, Bildungsroman
- Publisher: Blackwood
- Publication date: April 1907
- Publication place: United Kingdom
- Media type: Print (hardcover)
- Pages: 360 pp
- Dewey Decimal: 823.912

The Longest Journey is a bildungsroman by E. M. Forster, first published in 1907. It is the second of Forster's six published novels, following Where Angels Fear to Tread (1905) and preceding A Room with a View (1908) and Howards End (1910). It was Forster's favourite among his own novels.

== Plot summary ==
Rickie (Frederick) Elliot is a student at early twentieth century Cambridge, a university that seems like paradise to him, amongst bright if cynical companions, when he receives a visit from two friends, an engaged young woman, Agnes Pembroke, and her elder brother, Herbert. The Pembrokes are Rickie's only friends from home. An orphan who grew up living with cousins, he was sent to a private boarding school where he was shunned and bullied because of his lame foot, an inherited weakness, and frail body. Agnes, as it happens, is engaged to Gerald, now in the army, who was one of the sturdy youths who bullied Rickie at school. Rickie is not brilliant at argument, but he is intensely responsive to poetry and art, and is accepted within a circle of philosophical and intellectual fellow-students led by a brilliant but especially cynical aspiring philosopher, Stewart Ansell, who refuses, when he is introduced to her, even to acknowledge that Agnes exists.

When visiting the Pembrokes during his vacation, Rickie has an epiphanic vision of the sexual bond between Gerald, who is coarse but handsome and athletic, and Agnes, a bond he cannot imagine for himself. He takes these lovers' side in trying to speed their marriage, offering part of his own inheritance, an offer that insults Gerald. When Gerald is suddenly killed in a football match, Rickie finds a role consoling Agnes—he tells her she should "mind" what has happened, that is, that she should grieve—since her passion for Gerald has been the main event of her life. Rickie becomes Agnes' chief consolation and support, though he is in every way Gerald's opposite, and after a year or two, despite the failure of Rickie's stories to find a publisher, he and Agnes become engaged to marry.

The young couple pay a visit to Rickie's Aunt Emily Failing, a wealthy eccentric, the widow of a well-known essayist. On this visit they meet Aunt Emily's ward, Stephen, a quarrelsome and handsome semi-educated 19-year-old. For some reason—perhaps just to make malicious mischief—Aunt Emily wants Rickie and Stephen to get to know each other. The two young men do not take to each other at all, and quarrel. Yet it turns out that they are in fact half-brothers, a long-kept secret that Aunt Emily reveals to Rickie, mostly to shock him. Rickie assumes that Stephen is the illegitimate son of his father—a father he hated—who lived apart from Rickie's mother during Rickie's childhood. Illegitimacy in this period is considered to be a blight on the child, as well as the family, and Agnes, who is essentially conventional, considers Stephen's existence something to be deeply ashamed of and to be kept secret, and Stephen a person who deserves to be shunned.

Her brother, Herbert, has received an offer to be the head of a house at Sawston School, and can fill this post only if Agnes and Rickie marry quickly and join him, Agnes to be house mother, and Rickie to be a teacher of classics. Rickie's ambition to be a writer, and his freedom of thought, are suppressed by the dreary regimen of teaching, and his moral sense is suffocated by the influence of his wife and brother-in-law. He becomes a petty tyrant in the classroom, and an insensitive enforcer of school rules, though a part of him still sees and understands what he has lost, both as a writer and a man of refinement and sensitivity, since Cambridge. He is "dead" to his former friend, Stewart Ansell, who refuses to answer Rickie's letters. Ansell finally does pay a visit to Rickie, stopping at the house of another acquaintance, and by coincidence he meets Stephen, who (partly due to Agnes's scheming to get Aunt Emily's inheritance for Rickie and herself) has been expelled from Mrs. Failing's house. Stephen has discovered his identity at last, and now knows that Rickie is his half-brother. He wants to meet him again and see whether they might get on better. Ansell falls under the spell of Stephen's rustic honesty, physical vitality, and impulsiveness. Rickie, Agnes and Herbert assume Stephen has come to blackmail them and Agnes offers him money, but Stephen, who is in fact penniless, now wants nothing to do with them. In a horrifying blowout, in front of all the pupils, Ansell accuses Rickie and Agnes of wanting to deny Stephen's existence. Ansell reveals to Rickie that Stephen is, in fact, his mother's illegitimate child, not his father's. Rickie faints at this revelation.

Rickie's marriage has become loveless, as Ansell assumed it would, and with his brother's reappearance he realises that he has fallen under his wife's spell and denied his better nature. He leaves to find Stephen, dear to him now because he is the child of the same beloved mother, and he attempts unsuccessfully to assume the role of a brother, for example, to get him to stop drinking. The two of them go to Wiltshire to see his aunt. This brief period when they travel together restores to Rickie the sense of himself that has been lost ever since he fell under his wife's influence, and, as well, restores his sense of joy and playful love of life. Rickie is unable, however, to control his mercurial half-brother, who gets drunk despite his promise not to. Like his mother, and like Gerald, Rickie dies suddenly: his legs are severed when he tries to pull a drunken Stephen off some railway tracks.

Stephen survives, marries, and in a brief epilogue stands up to Herbert Pembroke for his right to money that is due to him with the publication of his half-brother's book of stories, now valuable since, after his death, Frederick Elliot has become a noted author. The "longest journey" which is the span of one's life, or, in another sense, the development into one's true self, has concluded successfully for Rickie, who has regained his sense of integrity. Though his life is cut short, he receives his vindication by coming to moral clarity at last, rejecting conventional hypocrisy, and acknowledging his bond to his brother. His uniqueness and worth are confirmed as well by his posthumous success as an artist.

The phrase "the longest journey" appears in Percy Bysshe Shelley's Epipsychidion:

I never was attached to that great sect
Whose doctrine is, that each one should select
Out of the crowd a mistress or a friend,
And all the rest, though fair and wise, commend
To cold oblivion, though it is in the code
Of modern morals, and the beaten road
Which those poor souls with weary footsteps tread,
Who travel to their home among the dead
By the broad highway of the world, and so
With one chained friend, perhaps a jealous foe,
The dreariest and longest journey go.

== Writing ==
Forster mapped out a loose plot in July 1904 after meeting a shepherd boy whilst walking in Wiltshire. He spent the first half of 1906 working on the novel. Returning to Weybridge from abroad in October 1906, Forster worked to complete it.

== Reception ==
Critically The Longest Journey is the most polarising of Forster's novels. The novel was well-reviewed but had disappointing sales when first released; it is most often viewed as a minor work compared to Forster's later novels. However, even in Forster's lifetime there was reassessment of the novel's quality, with literary critic Lionel Trilling calling it "...perhaps the most brilliant, the most dramatic, and the most passionate of his works." According to Margaret Drabble both the structure and the uncharacteristically high death count which occurs later in the book confuse fans of Forster. Gilbert Adair wrote that the greatest weaknesses for readers is its "unrelenting intellectuality, its sublimation and even outright repression of the importance of the erotic in human relationships" and the "...not always intentional priggishness of its characters", which he saw as constituting a poignant quality.
