= The Other Boat =

"The Other Boat" is a short story by E. M. Forster. It was started in 1913, completed in 1957–1958, and published posthumously in The Life to Come (and Other Stories) in 1972. It describes an interracial homosexual affair within the context of British imperialism.

== Summary ==
The story begins with a group of children playing on the deck of a boat, which is travelling from India to England. Lionel, who is one of the children playing, is attempting to get one of his friends, Cocoanut (named for his oddly shaped head), to play battle with him. Lionel is one of the five children belonging to Mrs. March, and is aboard the ship because his father had deserted his mother for a native he had met while fighting in a war abroad. Mrs. March makes several comments about how she disapproves of Lionel's friend, Cocoanut. She refers to him as having a touch of the "tar brush", or not being entirely of European ancestry. However, she allows them to go ahead and play together for most of the voyage. When she observes that the children are playing in direct sunlight, she sees to it that they play under the awning before they become afflicted with sunstroke. Baby, the youngest of the March children, begins crying as Mrs. March is yelling at the children, so she picks him up to carry him inside. Before she can get inside, however, a young sailor hops out of his cabin and draws a white line around her—which puts her in a state of mind where she cannot escape the circle that surrounds her. Then, Cocoanut appears, screaming that she has been caught. She becomes infuriated with Cocoanut, telling him he is "a silly idle useless unmanly little boy".

Years later, Lionel has become a captain in the British army, and is known for being a war hero, after he was injured in battle. He has grown into a handsome young man, with blonde hair, blue eyes, and broad shoulders. Lionel is aboard a ship to India, where he is to meet up with Isabel, a girl who we assume he is to marry. After boarding the ship, he is made aware that his old friend Cocoanut is also aboard, and had made arrangements for them to share a room together. Lionel seems rather shocked, and quite uncertain about sharing a room with a "half-caste". But because the ship is already full, and because he acknowledges that his prejudices are tribal, and not personal, he seemingly agrees to room with Cocoanut.

At first, things seem normal. They unpacked as they talked about old times, joking with each other. And then suddenly things became awkward. As Lionel was sitting on his top bunk, Cocoanut grabbed his leg, and began feeling up until he had reached his groin. Lionel's mind begins to race. He is confused and disgusted as he leaps from his bunk, running out the door. At first he goes to see the Master at Arms, but comes to find out that he is nowhere to be found. He then heads to the Purser's office, demanding that he have his room switched, without giving any reason whatsoever. When the Purser explains that all of the rooms are already full, Lionel furiously marches out of the office. He goes to the front of the ship and watches as he moves farther away from England as he tries to decide what to do. While at the front of the ship he runs into Captain Arbuthnot and his wife, and they form a group known as the Big Eight. After a few drinks and jokes, Lionel begins to loosen up a bit, and complains about having to room with a "wog". Feeling a little bit better, Lionel decides to go ahead and deal with Cocoanut being his roommate for the voyage, and tries to forget about the strange incident that had happened earlier.

Everything seemed to be going well. "Order had been reestablished", as Lionel put it. But Lionel can't help but think back on the night when Cocoanut had made his move, and even wonders what would have happened if he had granted Cocoanuts desires. The ship enters the Mediterranean Sea, and one night, after Lionel returns to his cabin, he is awaited by Cocoanut and a bottle of champagne. After a few drinks, Lionel gave in Cocoanut's seduction, and as they lay in bed together, they talked about their lives. At one point, Cocoanut questions the large scar that Lionel has on his groin area. It turns out that the scar was Lionel's "battle wound", which is what ended up making him a war hero. After the story of the battle wound, Lionel continues talking, getting further into deeply personal stories from his younger days. Cocoanut, who we know very little about, doesn't go into much detail about his past. We are able to gather that he is in charge some type of business, although his specific occupation is never revealed. We also know that he has several passports from different countries, which causes us to become sceptical of who Cocoanut really is.

While the two men lay entwined in their cabin, we realise that they have become close with one another—Not only on a physical level, but on an emotional level as well. At one point, Lionel says "I’m fonder of you than I know how to say". Cocoanut's response is that Lionel should have someone to take care of him. The two men ponder being together, but Lionel comes to the realisation that it would be impossible.

Suddenly, Lionel notices the bolt on the door. It had been unlocked the entirety of their lovemaking. Realizing that anyone could have walked into the cabin at any moment, Lionel becomes increasingly distressed. At first he blames himself for being too careless, but then Cocoanut claims that it was partly his fault also, because he knew that the door was unlocked the entire time. Furious with Cocoanut for not mentioning this before, Lionel decides he needs to go out on the deck for a smoke. Realizing the seriousness of what just transpired, Cocoanut says to Lionel as he is walking out the door, "When you come back you will not be you. And I may not be I". As he is out on the deck for a smoke, he sees Colonel Arbuthnot sleeping, next to his wife. He thinks about everything which he would lose if anyone were to find out about the scandal with Cocoanut. He was the first born, and felt responsible for maintaining integrity of the family name. Thinking of Isabel, who is waiting on him in India, he decides what happened would not follow him any further. Hearing Lionel, Colonel Arbuthnot wakes up, and apologises to Lionel for having to bunk with a wog. Apparently, it had just been discovered that Cocoanut was not supposed to be on the boat at all. He had sent some "fat bribes" out to get himself aboard the ship. After his discussion with the Colonel, Lionel leaves the deck.

Returning to the cabin, Lionel sees Cocoanut in his top bunk. Getting close to Lionel, Cocoanut insists that he kiss him. When Lionel rejects him, Cocoanut decides to go in for the kiss regardless and bites Lionel's forearm. Lionel flashes back to the war and strangles Cocoanut, then kisses his eyelids tenderly, then commits suicide by throwing himself into the ocean. His body is never found.
