= Abinger Harvest =

E.M. Forster book of essays

- Author: E. M. Forster
- Language: English
- Genre: Non-fiction
- Published: Edward Arnold Ltd
- Publication date: 1936
- Publication place: United Kingdom
- Pages: 363

Abinger Harvest is a 1936 non-fiction book by English author E. M. Forster. The book is a mixture of autobiographical writing and literary criticism, along with essays and poems written by Forster as a freelancer spanning back to 1903. This, alongside Two Cheers for Democracy, was one of two collections of essays published during Forster's lifetime.

== Background ==
Starting in August 1934, Forster began assembling a collection of his essays with the support of William Plomer. Some of the writing was taken from as far back as his time in Egypt and focused on, among other things, Englishness. Forster had faced opposition to the name Abinger Harvest and said that people "made a face like a shrew mouse" upon hearing the title.

== Contents ==
The book is divided into four sections and an article on a country pageant:

- "The Present"

The essays in this section focus on contemporary society, post-war culture, England and Englishness.

- "Books"
- "The Past"
- The East"
- "The Abinger Pageant"

Abinger Hammer is a small village in the Vale of Holmesdale that had been connected to the Forsters for many decades.

The work received a muted and divided response. Q. D. Leavis called it "a disappointing book" in a review published in Scrutiny, but in The Yale Review John Crowe Ransom called it "one of the notable literary miscellanies of our time".

== Libel action: "A Flood in the Office" ==
The first edition included an article reviewing a pamphlet by engineer William Willcocks titled "A Flood in the Office". Willcocks' pamphlet disparaged Murdoch Macdonald's views on treatment of the Nile and Murdoch subsequently won a libel case against Willcocks for the publication. Forster's review heavily favoured Willcock's interpretation.

By reprinting the review, Forster had restated the libel. This caused Murdoch to pursue Forster for damages. Forster and his publisher ultimately had to pay £500 and costs, the withdraw the article from Abinger Harvest and issue an apology in court. Unsold copies of the book were re-issued with the pages containing "A Flood in the Office" removed. This resulted in 1936 re-issued copies of Abinger Harvest to list "A Flood in the Office" in its table of contents without actually containing the article.

The incident made Forster concerned about potential libellous content in his work on T. E. Lawrence. He even unsuccessfully reached out to Lawrence's estate to gain assurances he would not be sued.
