= The Life to Come (short story) =

Short story by E. M. Forster

"The Life to Come" is a short story by English writer E. M. Forster, written in 1922 and published posthumously in The Life to Come (and Other Stories) in 1972.

It was written into four chapters: Night, Evening, Day and Morning.

In 2017, Surrey Opera gave the world premiere of The Life to Come, an opera in two acts by British composer Louis Mander, with libretto by Stephen Fry.
