= E. M. Forster =

English novelist and writer (1879–1970)

E. M. Forster OM CH
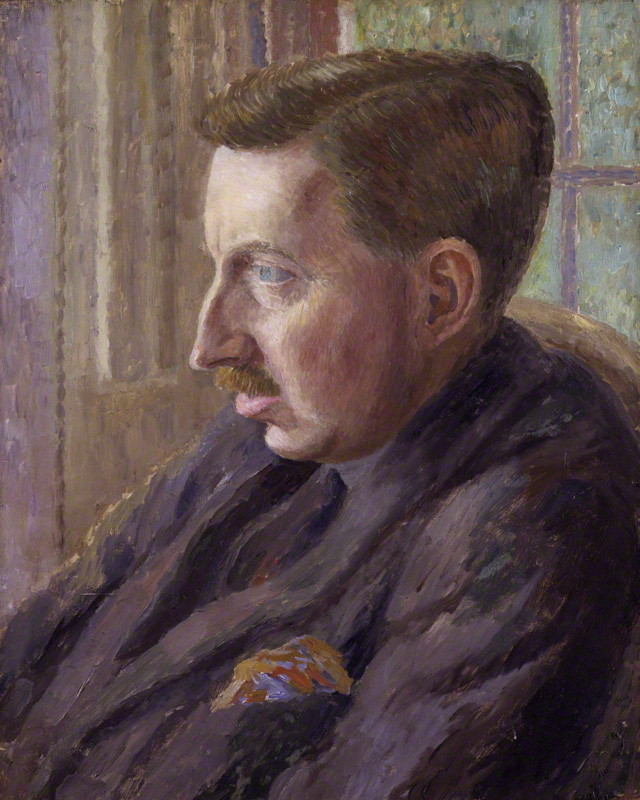
- Portrait of Forster by Dora Carrington, c. 1924–1925
- Born: Edward Morgan Forster; 1 January 1879 Marylebone, Middlesex, England
- Died: 7 June 1970 (aged 91) Coventry, Warwickshire, England
- Occupation: Writer (novels, short stories, essays)
- Education: University of Cambridge (BA)
- Period: 1901–1970
- Genre: Realism, symbolism, modernism
- Subjects: Class division, gender, imperialism, homosexuality
- Notable works: A Room with a View (1908); Howards End (1910); A Passage to India (1924); Maurice (1971)

Signature
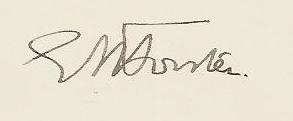

Edward Morgan Forster (1 January 1879 – 7 June 1970) was an English author. He is best known for his novels, particularly A Room with a View (1908), Howards End (1910) and A Passage to India (1924). He also wrote numerous short stories, essays, speeches and broadcasts, as well as biographies and pageant plays. His short story "The Machine Stops" (1909) is often viewed as the beginning of technological dystopian fiction. He also co-authored the libretto to Benjamin Britten's opera Billy Budd (1951). Many of his novels examine class differences and hypocrisy. His views as a humanist are at the heart of his work.

Considered one of the most successful English novelists of the Edwardian era, he was nominated for the Nobel Prize in Literature in 22 separate years. He declined a knighthood in 1949, though he received the Order of Merit upon his 90th birthday. Forster was made a Member of the Order of the Companions of Honour in 1953, and in 1961 he was one of the first five authors named as a Companion of Literature by the Royal Society of Literature.

After attending Tonbridge School, Forster studied history and classics at King's College, Cambridge, where he met fellow future writers such as Lytton Strachey and Leonard Woolf. He then travelled throughout Europe before publishing his first novel, Where Angels Fear to Tread, in 1905. The last of his novels to be published, Maurice, is a tale of homosexual love in early 20th-century England. While completed in 1914, the novel was not published until 1971, the year after his death.

Many of his novels were posthumously adapted for cinema, beginning with David Lean's well-received film of A Passage to India (1984), which was followed by Merchant Ivory Productions' A Room with a View (1985), Maurice (1987) and Howards End (1992). These critically acclaimed period dramas featured lavish sets and esteemed British actors including Helena Bonham Carter, Daniel Day-Lewis, Hugh Grant, Anthony Hopkins and Emma Thompson.

== Early life ==
Forster, born at 6 Melcombe Place, Dorset Square, London NW1, which no longer stands, was the only child of the Anglo-Irish Alice Clara "Lily" (née Whichelo) and a Welsh architect, Edward Morgan Llewellyn Forster. He was registered as Henry Morgan Forster, but accidentally baptised Edward Morgan Forster. His father died of tuberculosis on 30 October 1880, before Forster's second birthday. His father's sisters helped his mother to raise him. The tension between his father's strait-laced, religious family and his doting mother influenced the themes of his work.

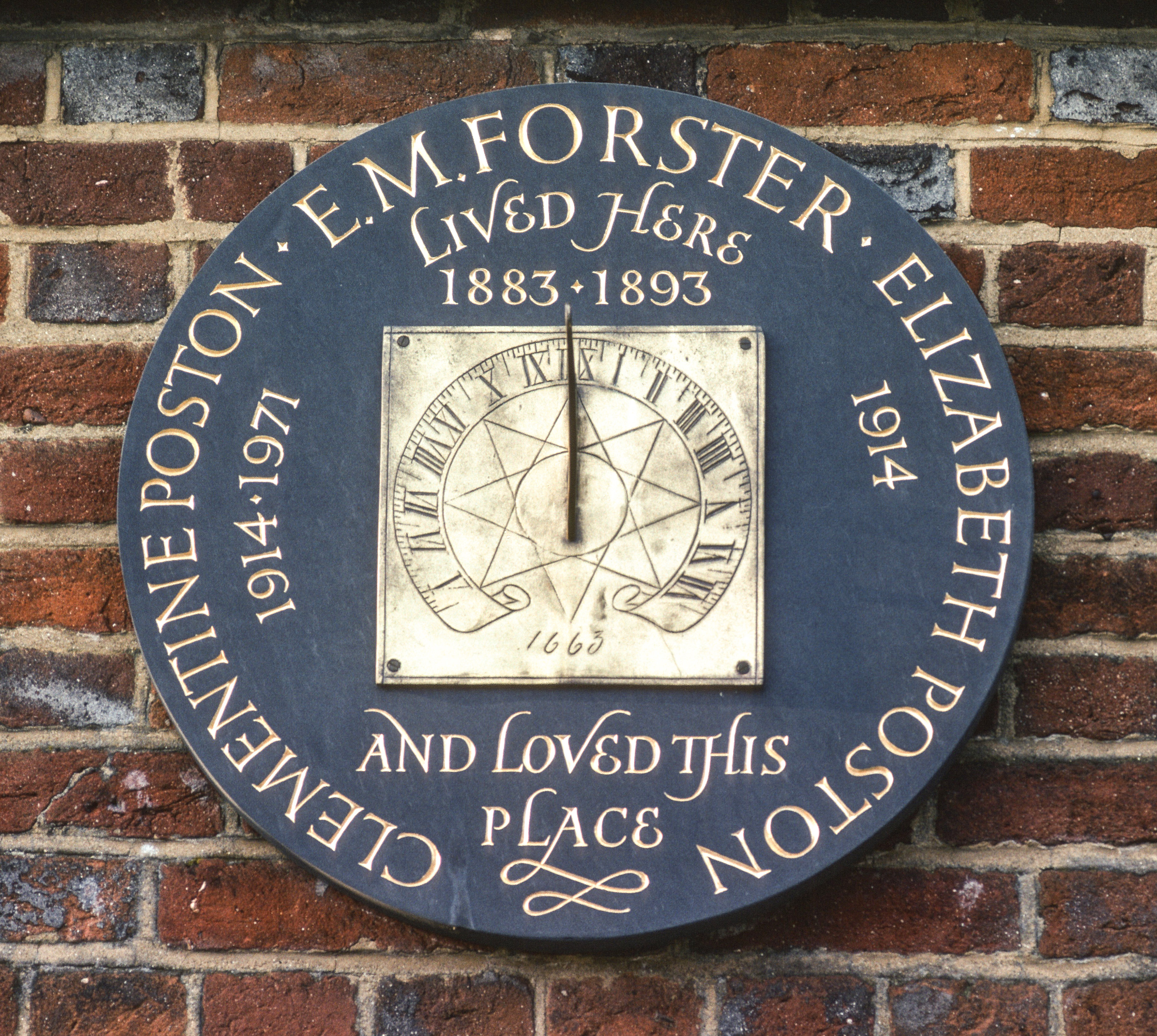
Plaque and sundial at Rooks Nest in Stevenage, Hertfordshire, the childhood home remembered in Forster's novel Howards End.

In 1883, he and his mother moved to Rooks Nest, near Stevenage, Hertfordshire, where they lived until 1893. This was to serve as a model for the house Howards End in his novel of that name. It is listed Grade I on the National Heritage List for England for historic interest and literary associations. Forster had fond memories of his childhood at Rooks Nest. He continued to visit the house into the later 1940s, and he retained the furniture all his life.

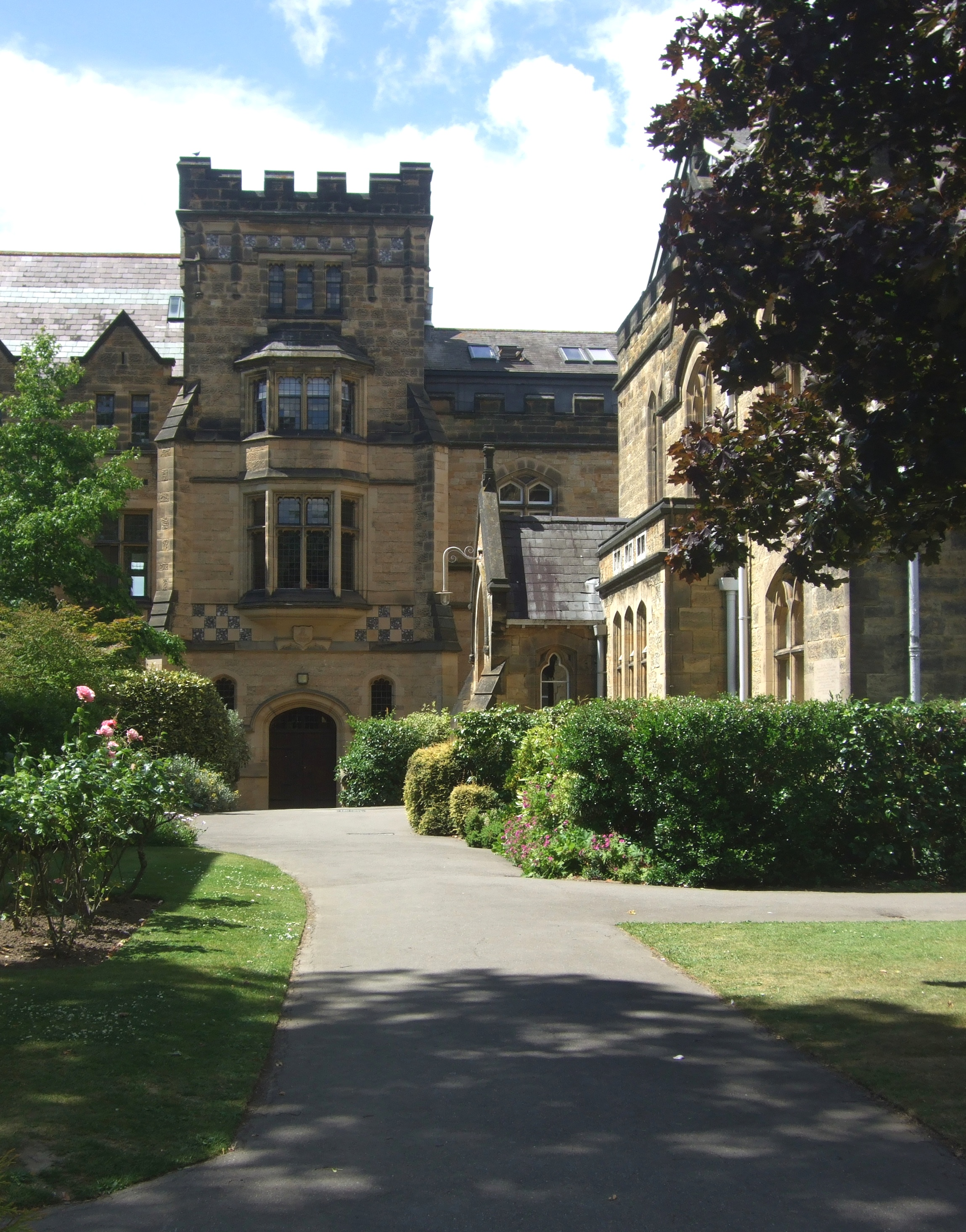
A section of the main building, Tonbridge School

Among Forster's ancestors were members of the Clapham Sect, a social reform group in the Church of England. Forster inherited £8,000 (equivalent to £909,473 in 2025) in trust from his paternal great-aunt Marianne Thornton (daughter of the abolitionist Henry Thornton), who died on 5 November 1887. This was enough to live on and enabled him to become a writer. He attended as a day boy Tonbridge School in Kent, where the school theatre has been named in his honour, although he is known to have been unhappy there.

At King's College, Cambridge, in 1897–1901, he became a member of the discussion group known as the Apostles (formally the Cambridge Conversazione Society). They met in secret to discuss their work on philosophical and moral questions. Many of its members went on to constitute what came to be known as the Bloomsbury Group, of which Forster was a member in the 1910s and 1920s. There is a famous recreation of Forster's Cambridge at the beginning of The Longest Journey. The Schlegel sisters of Howards End are based to some degree on Vanessa and Virginia Stephen. Forster graduated with a BA with second-class honours in classics and history.

== Career ==
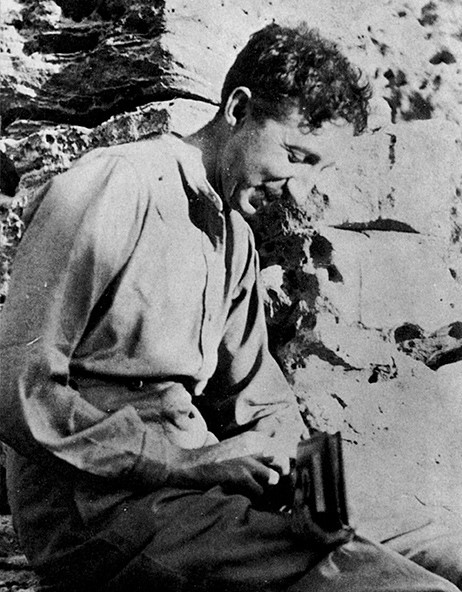
Forster circa 1917

In 1903, Forster travelled in Greece and Italy out of interest in their classical heritage. He then sought a post in Germany, to learn the language, and spent several months in the summer of 1905 in Nassenheide, Pomerania (now the Polish village of Rzędziny), as a tutor to the children of the writer Elizabeth von Arnim. He wrote a short memoir of this experience, which was one of the happiest times in his life.

Forster spent six months in India in 1912−1913, travelling with R. C. Trevelyan and Goldsworthy Lowes Dickinson. During this trip he visited Syed Ross Masood, a close friend he had met in England in 1906, through whom he first became familiar with Indian and Islamic culture. Forster began writing A Passage to India upon his return, and would later dedicate the book to Masood. By 1914 he had written all but one of his novels. As a conscientious objector in the First World War, Forster served as a Chief Searcher (for missing servicemen) for the British Red Cross in Alexandria, Egypt.

Forster spent a second spell in India in the early 1920s as private secretary to Tukojirao III, Maharajah of Dewas. The Hill of Devi is his non-fictional account of this period. Upon his return to England, Forster finished A Passage to India. All six of his novels were completed in Weybridge, Surrey.

Forster was awarded a Benson Medal in 1937. In the 1930s and 1940s, Forster became a notable broadcaster on BBC Radio, and while George Orwell was the BBC India Section talks producer from 1941 to 1943, he commissioned from Forster a weekly book review. Forster was President of the National Council for Civil Liberties, as well as Cambridge Humanists from 1959 to his death. Forster became publicly associated with the British Humanist Association. In addition to his broadcasting, he advocated individual liberty and penal reform and opposed censorship by writing articles, sitting on committees and signing letters. He testified as a witness for the defence in the 1960 obscenity trial over the sexually explicit content in D. H. Lawrence's previously unpublished Lady Chatterley's Lover.

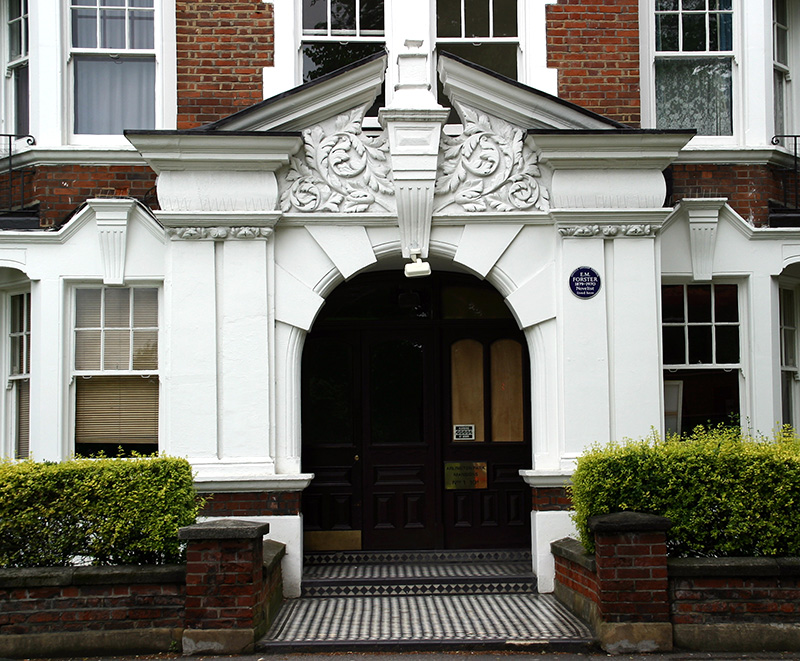
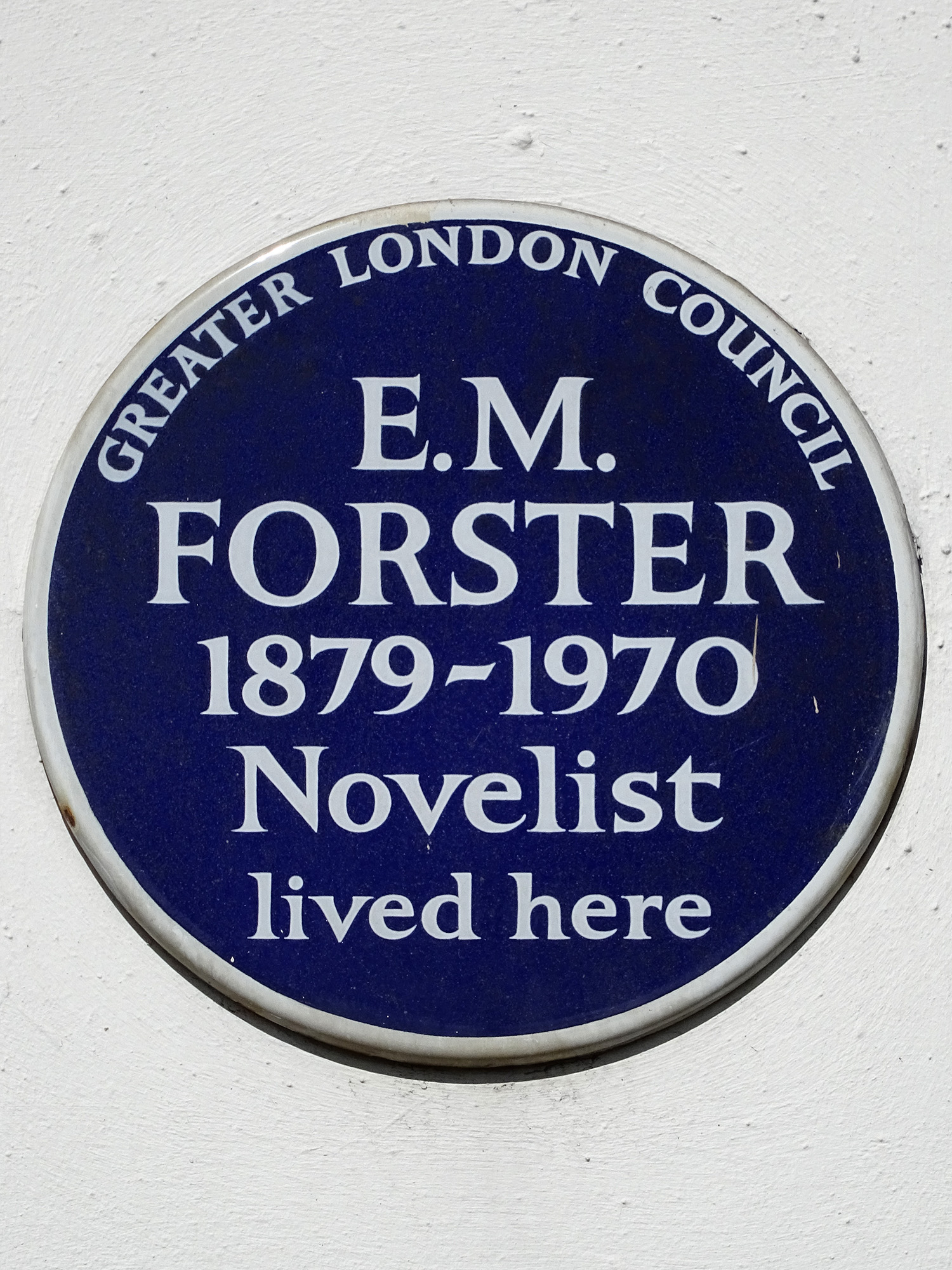
Arlington Park Mansions in Chiswick, Forster's London home from 1939 until his death in 1970, with a close-up of the commemorative blue plaque at the address.

Forster was elected an honorary fellow of King's College in January 1946, and lived for the most part in the college, doing relatively little. In April 1947 he arrived in America for a three-month nationwide tour of public readings and sightseeing, returning to the East Coast in June. He declined a knighthood in 1949 and was made a Member of the Order of the Companions of Honour in 1953. At age 82, he wrote his last short story, Little Imber, a science fiction tale. According to his friend Richard Marquand, Forster was critical of American foreign policy in his latter years, which was one reason he refused offers to adapt his novels for the screen, as Forster felt such productions would involve American financing.

At 85 he went on a pilgrimage to the Wiltshire countryside that had inspired his favourite among his own novels, The Longest Journey, escorted by William Golding. In 1961, he was one of the first five authors named as a Companion of Literature by the Royal Society of Literature. In 1969, he was made a member of the Order of Merit on his 90th birthday.

== Work ==
=== Novels ===
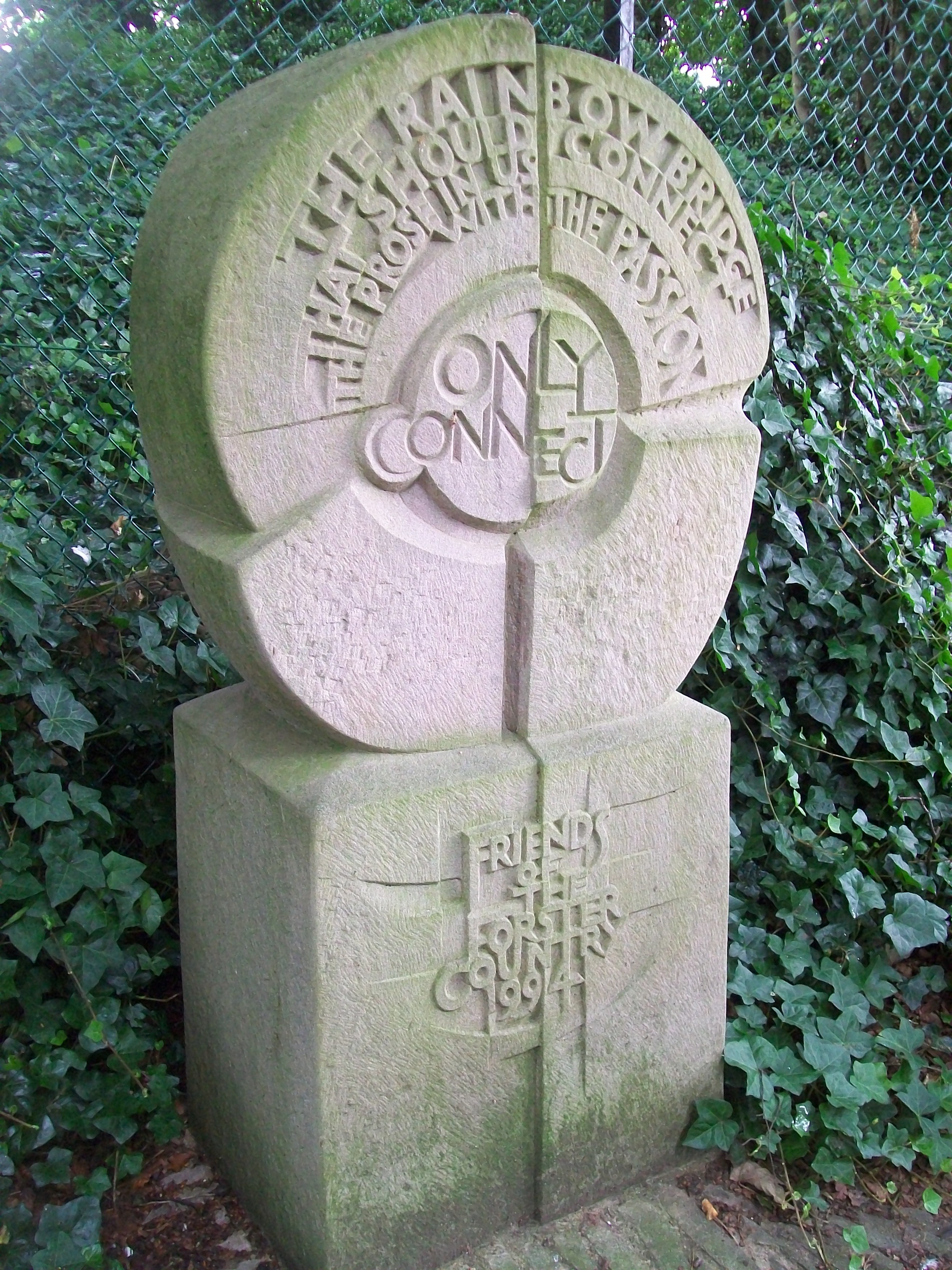
The monument to Forster in Stevenage, Hertfordshire, near Rooks Nest where Forster grew up. He based the setting for his novel Howards End on this area, now informally known as Forster Country.

Forster had five novels published in his lifetime. Although Maurice was published shortly after his death, it had been written nearly sixty years earlier. His first novel, Where Angels Fear to Tread (1905), tells of Lilia, a young English widow who falls in love with an Italian, and of the efforts of her bourgeois relatives to get her back from Monteriano (based on San Gimignano). Philip Herriton's mission to retrieve her from Italy has features in common with that of Lambert Strether in Henry James's The Ambassadors. Forster discussed James' novel ironically and somewhat disapprovingly in his book Aspects of the Novel (1927). Where Angels Fear to Tread was adapted as a 1991 film directed by Charles Sturridge, starring Helena Bonham Carter, Rupert Graves, Judy Davis and Helen Mirren.

Next, Forster published The Longest Journey (1907), an inverted Bildungsroman following the lame Rickie Elliott from Cambridge to a career as a struggling writer and then a post as a schoolmaster, married to an unappealing Agnes Pembroke. In a series of scenes on the Wiltshire hills, which introduce Rickie's wild half-brother Stephen Wonham, Forster attempts a kind of sublime related to those of Thomas Hardy and D. H. Lawrence.

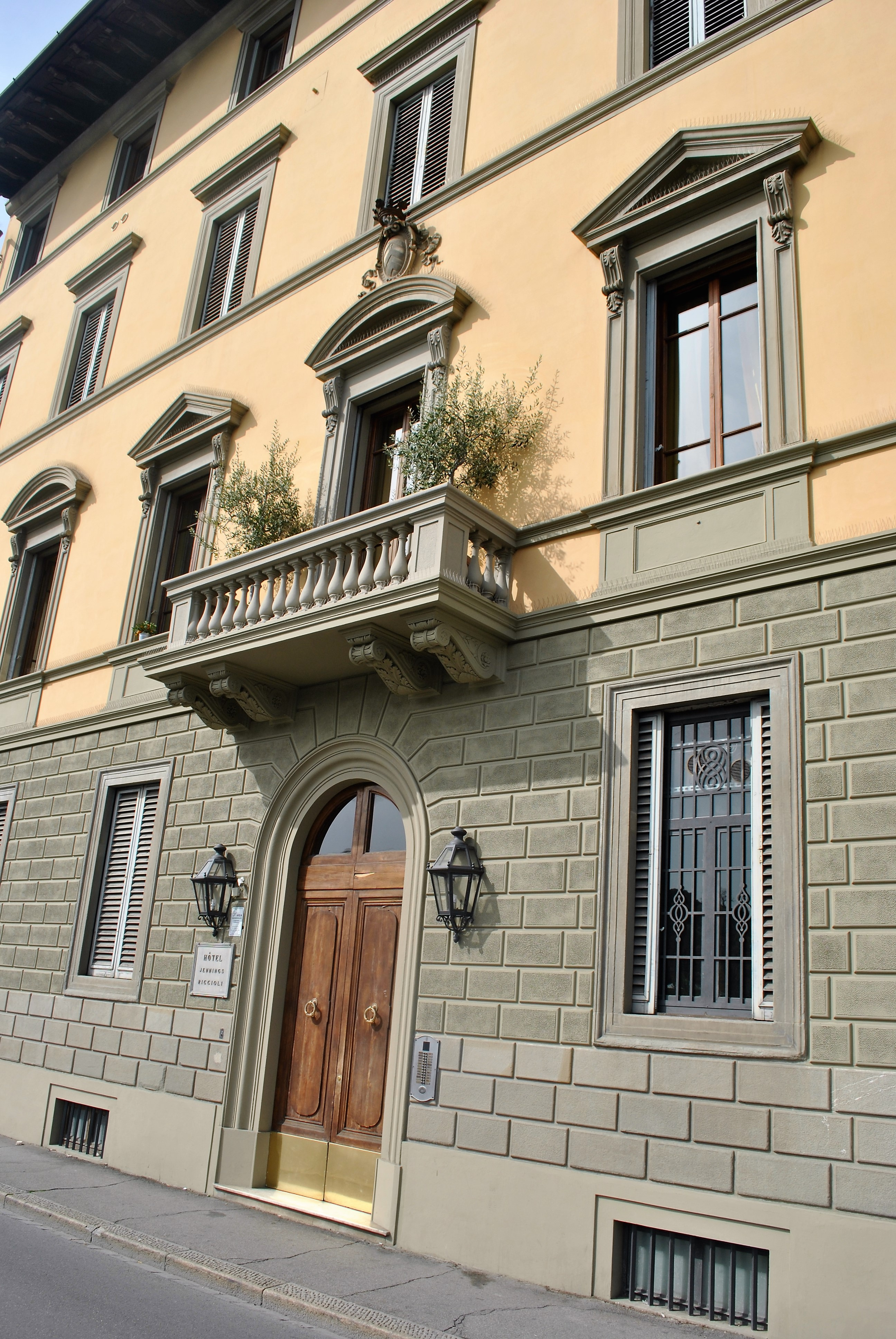
Forster and his mother stayed at Pensione Simi, which was located in Palazzo Jennings Riccioli, Florence, in 1901. Forster took inspiration from this stay for the Pension Bertolini in A Room with a View.

Forster's third novel, A Room with a View (1908), is his lightest and most optimistic. It was started in 1901, before any of his others, initially under the title Lucy. It explores young Lucy Honeychurch's trip to Italy with a cousin and the choice she must make between the free-thinking George Emerson and the repressed aesthete Cecil Vyse. George's father Mr Emerson quotes thinkers who influenced Forster, including Samuel Butler. It was adapted as a film of the same name in 1985 by the Merchant Ivory team, starring Helena Bonham Carter, Maggie Smith, Julian Sands, Denholm Elliott and Daniel Day-Lewis, and as a televised adaptation of the same name in 2007 by Andrew Davies.

Where Angels Fear to Tread and A Room with a View can be seen as Forster's Italian novels. Both include references to the famous Baedeker guidebooks and concern narrow-minded middle-class English tourists abroad. The books share themes with his short stories collected in The Celestial Omnibus and The Eternal Moment.

Howards End (1910) is an ambitious "condition-of-England" novel about various groups among the Edwardian middle classes, represented by the Schlegels (bohemian intellectuals), the Wilcoxes (thoughtless plutocrats) and the Basts (struggling lower-middle-class aspirants). Howards End was adapted as a film in 1992 by the Merchant-Ivory team, starring Vanessa Redgrave, Emma Thompson, Anthony Hopkins, and Helena Bonham-Carter. Thompson won the Academy Award for Best Actress for her performance as Margaret Schlegel. It was also adapted as a miniseries in 2017. An opera libretto Howards End, America was created in 2016 by Claudia Stevens.

Forster's greatest success, A Passage to India (1924) takes as its subject the relations between East and West, seen through the lens of India in the later days of the British Raj. Forster connects personal relations with the politics of colonialism through the story of the Englishwoman Adela Quested, the Indian Dr. Aziz, and the question of what did or did not happen between them in the Marabar Caves. Forster makes special mention of the author Ahmed Ali and his Twilight in Delhi in a preface to its Everyman's Library Edition. The novel was awarded the James Tait Black Memorial Prize for fiction. A Passage to India was adapted as a play in 1960, directed by Frank Hauser, and as a film in 1984, directed by David Lean, starring Alec Guinness, Judy Davis and Peggy Ashcroft, with the latter winning the 1985 Oscar for Best Supporting Actress.

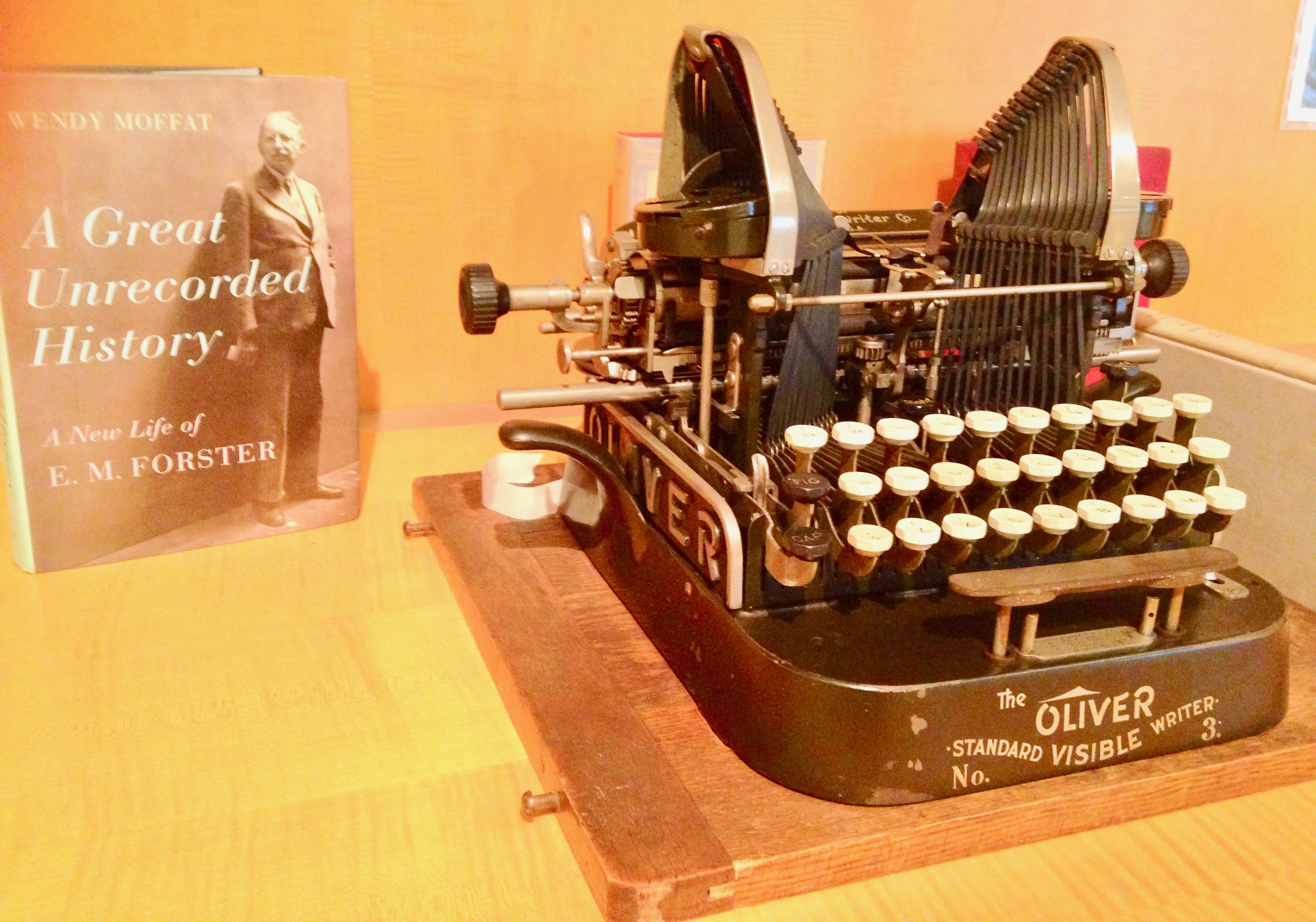
E. M. Forster's typewriter

Maurice (1971), published posthumously, is a homosexual love story that also returns to matters familiar from Forster's first three novels, such as the suburbs of London in the English home counties, the experience of attending Cambridge, and the wild landscape of Wiltshire. The novel was controversial, given that Forster's homosexuality had not been publicly known or widely acknowledged. Today's critics continue to debate over the extent to which Forster's sexuality and personal activities influenced his writing. Maurice was adapted as a film in 1987 by the Merchant Ivory team. It starred James Wilby and Hugh Grant who played lovers (for which both gained acclaim) and Rupert Graves, with Denholm Elliott, Simon Callow and Ben Kingsley in the supporting cast.

Early in his career, Forster attempted a historical novel about the Byzantine scholar Gemistus Pletho and the Italian condottiero Sigismondo de Malatesta, but was dissatisfied with the result and never published it, though he kept the manuscript and later showed it to Naomi Mitchison.

=== Critical reception ===
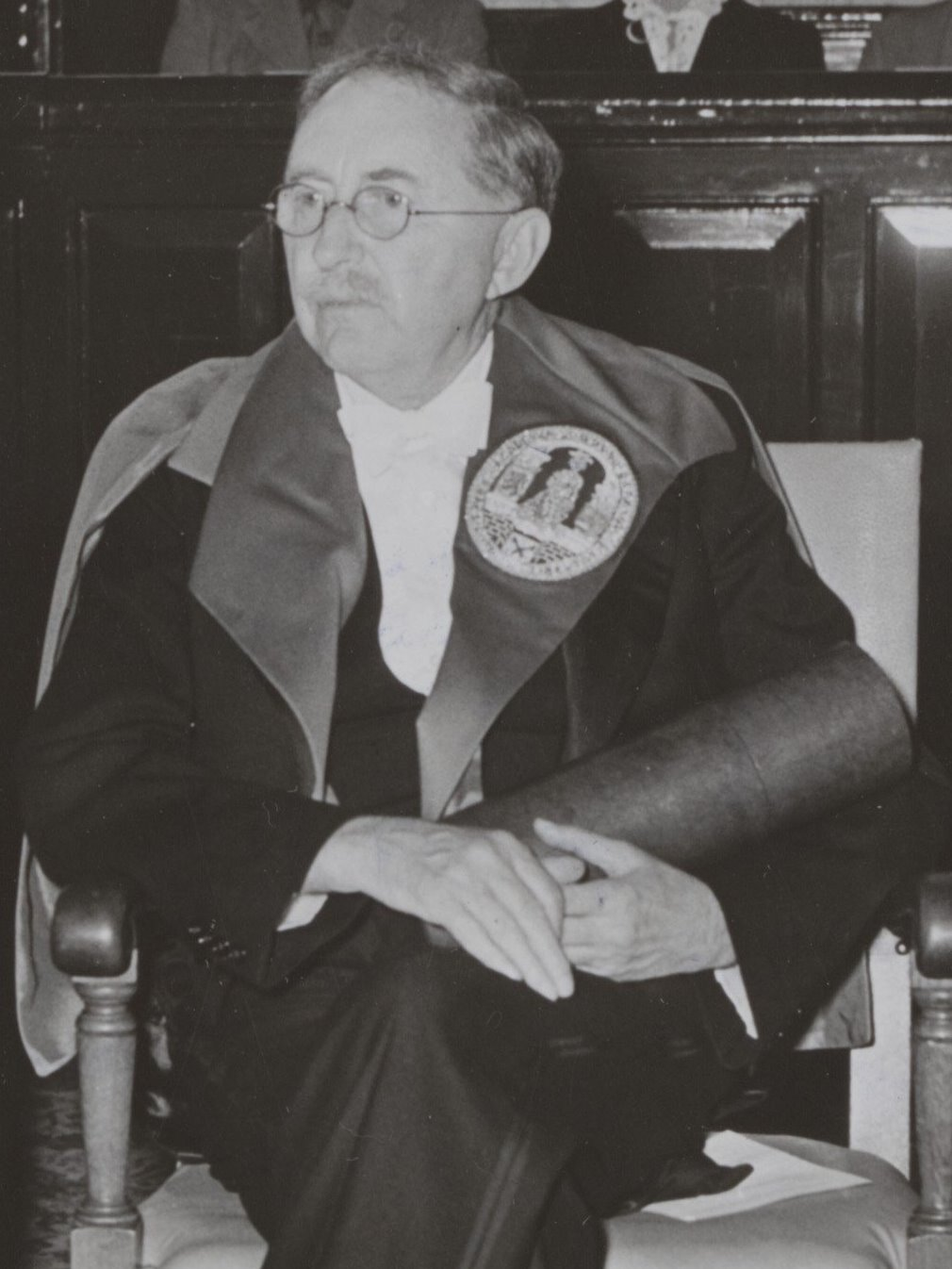
Forster receiving an honorary doctorate from Leiden University (1954)

Forster's first novel, Where Angels Fear to Tread, was described by reviewers as "astonishing" and "brilliantly original". The Manchester Guardian (forerunner of The Guardian) noted "a persistent vein of cynicism which is apt to repel," though "the cynicism is not deep-seated." The novel is labelled "a sordid comedy culminating, unexpectedly and with a real dramatic force, in a grotesque tragedy." Lionel Trilling remarked on this first novel as "a whole and mature work dominated by a fresh and commanding intelligence".

Subsequent books were similarly received on publication. The Manchester Guardian commented on Howards End, describing it as "a novel of high quality written with what appears to be a feminine brilliance of perception... witty and penetrating." An essay by David Cecil in Poets and Storytellers (1949) describes Forster as "pulsing with intelligence and sensibility", but primarily concerned with an original moral vision: "He tells a story as well as anyone who ever lived".

The beginning of technological dystopian fiction is traced to Forster's "The Machine Stops", a 1909 short story where most people live underground in isolation. M. Keith Booker states that "The Machine Stops," We and Brave New World are "the great defining texts of the genre of dystopian fiction, both in [the] vividness of their engagement with real-world social and political issues and in the scope of their critique of the societies on which they focus." Will Gompertz for the BBC writes, "The Machine Stops is not simply prescient; it is a jaw-droppingly, gob-smackingly, breath-takingly accurate literary description of lockdown life in 2020."

American interest in Forster was spurred by Lionel Trilling's E. M. Forster: A Study, which called him "the only living novelist who can be read again and again and who, after each reading, gives me what few writers can give us after our first days of novel-reading, the sensation of having learned something." (Trilling 1943)

Criticism of his works has included comments on unlikely pairings of characters who marry or get engaged and the lack of realistic depiction of sexual attraction.

=== Key themes ===
Forster was President of the Cambridge Humanists from 1959 until his death and a member of the Advisory Council of the British Humanist Association from 1963 until his death. His views as a humanist are at the heart of his work, which often depicts the pursuit of personal connections despite the restrictions of contemporary society. His humanist attitude is expressed in the 1938 essay What I Believe (reprinted with two other humanist essays – and an introduction and notes by Nicolas Walter). When Forster's cousin Philip Whichelo donated a portrait of Forster to the Gay and Lesbian Humanist Association (GLHA), Jim Herrick, the founder, quoted Forster's words: "The humanist has four leading characteristics – curiosity, a free mind, belief in good taste, and belief in the human race."

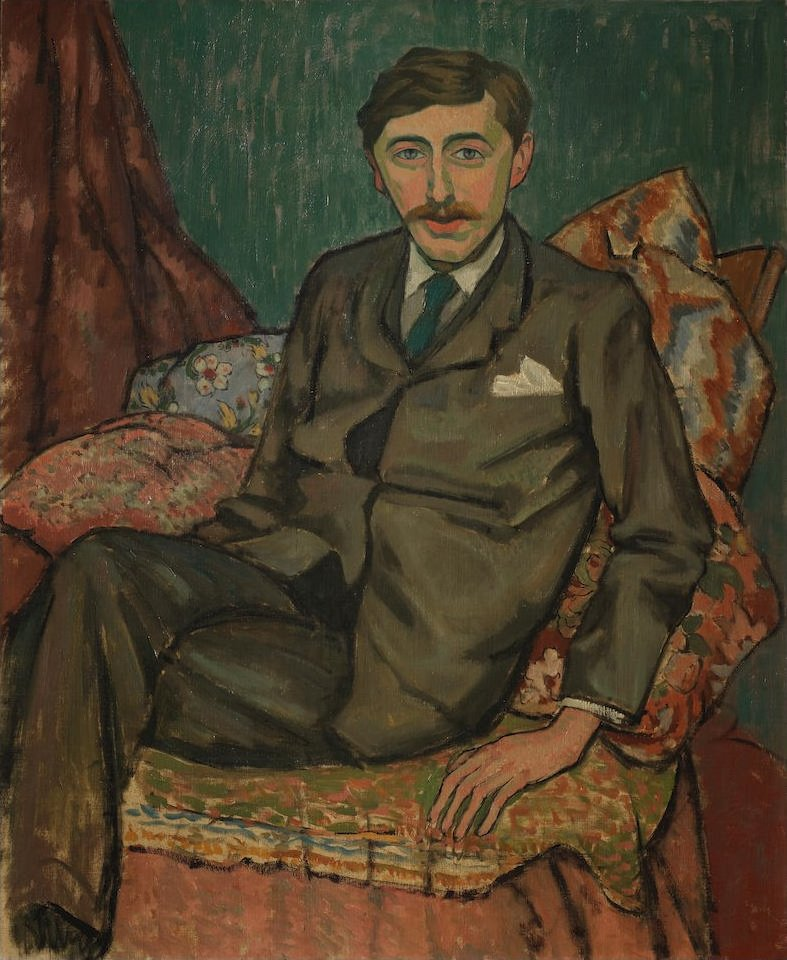
Portrait of Forster in 1911 by Roger Fry, painted a year after receiving critical acclaim for his fourth novel Howards End. Both members of the Bloomsbury Group, Fry was an influence on Forster's aesthetics.

Two of Forster's best-known works, A Passage to India and Howards End, explore the irreconcilability of class differences. A Room with a View also shows how questions of propriety and class can make human connection difficult. A Room with a View is his most widely read and accessible work, remaining popular long after its original publication. His posthumous novel Maurice explores the possibility of class reconciliation as one facet of a homosexual relationship.

Sexuality is another key theme in Forster's works. Some critics have argued that a general shift from heterosexual to homosexual love can be observed throughout the course of his writing career. The foreword to Maurice describes his struggle with his homosexuality, while he explored similar issues in several volumes of short stories. Forster's explicitly homosexual writings, the novel Maurice and the short story collection The Life to Come, were published shortly after his death. Beyond his literary explorations of sexuality, Forster also expressed his views publicly; in 1953, Forster openly advocated in The New Statesman and Nation for a change in the law in regard to homosexuality (which would be legalised in England and Wales in 1967, three years prior to his death), arguing that homosexuality between adults should be treated without bias and on the same grounds as heterosexuality.

Forster is noted for his use of symbolism as a technique in his novels, and he has been criticised (as by his friend Roger Fry) for his attachment to mysticism. One example of his symbolism is the wych elm tree in Howards End. The characters of Mrs Wilcox in that novel and Mrs Moore in A Passage to India have a mystical link with the past, and a striking ability to connect with people from beyond their own circles. Forster, Henry James, and W. Somerset Maugham were the earliest writers in English to portray characters from diverse countries – France, Germany, Italy and India. Their work explores cultural conflict, but arguably the motifs of humanism and cosmopolitanism are dominant. In a way, this is anticipation of the concept of human beings shedding national identities and becoming more and more liberal and tolerant.

== Personal life ==
=== Family ===
From 1925 until his mother's death at age 90 in March 1945, Forster lived with her at the house of West Hackhurst in the village of Abinger Hammer, Surrey; he continued to live there until September 1946. His London base was 26 Brunswick Square from 1930 to 1939, after which he rented 9 Arlington Park Mansions in Chiswick until at least 1961.

=== Friendships ===
While stationed in Egypt, Forster became friendly with the Greek poet C. P. Cavafy, described in the Oxford Dictionary of National Biography article on Forster as "an active homosexual". Forster was a close friend of the socialist poet and philosopher Edward Carpenter. A visit to Carpenter and his lover George Merrill in 1913 inspired Forster's novel Maurice, which is partly based on them. During his time in Egypt he also wrote regularly to Carpenter, whom he told about openly gay life in Alexandria.

He is considered part of the Bloomsbury Group. Forster also edited the letters of Eliza Fay (1756–1816) from India, in an edition first published in 1925. In 2012, Tim Leggatt, who had known Forster for his last 15 years, wrote a memoir based on unpublished correspondence with him over those years. He was friends with fellow gay novelist Christopher Isherwood, whom William Plomer introduced to him in 1932 and to whom he showed an early draft of Maurice decades before its posthumous publication. Writers with whom he associated included the poet Siegfried Sassoon and the Belfast-based novelist Forrest Reid.

=== Relationships ===
Forster was open with his close friends about his homosexuality, though he did not acknowledge it to the public. He never married and had a number of male lovers during his adult life.

Biographer P. N. Furbank suggested that Forster's feelings for Syed Ross Masood, whom he met in England and visited in India, may have been romantic, and their correspondence exhibits a strong affection between the two. Forster "lost his R [respectability]" to a wounded soldier whilst in Egypt in 1917, and had a short-lived but emotionally powerful affair with an Egyptian tram conductor, Mohammad el Adl. The pair met in 1917 and quickly developed an interest in each other. Their relationship began to end in 1918, as el Adl prepared to marry. El Adl and his wife had a son, whom they named Morgan. After returning to England in 1919, Forster visited el Adl in 1922 and found him deathly ill with tuberculosis. After el Adl's death, his widow sent his wedding ring to Forster. Forster kept el Adl's letters for the rest of his life.

In 1960, Forster began a relationship with the Bulgarian émigré Mattei Radev, a picture framer and art collector who moved in Bloomsbury group circles. He was Forster's junior by 46 years. They met at Long Crichel House, a Georgian rectory in Long Crichel, Dorset, a country retreat shared by Edward Sackville-West and the gallery owner and artist Eardley Knollys.

==== Bob Buckingham ====
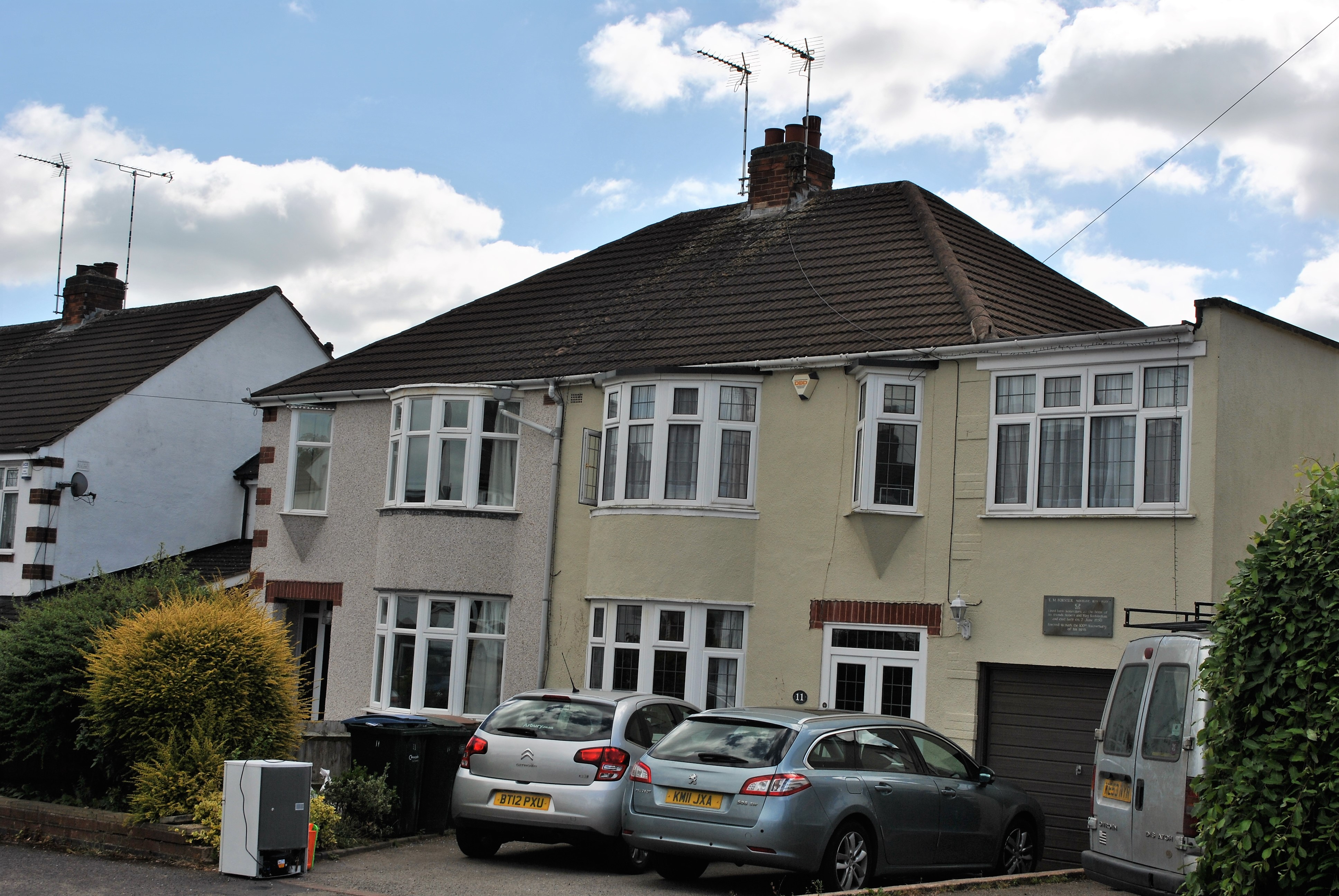
Forster lived and died at this house, the home of his friends Robert and May Buckingham. The sign above the garage door marks the 100th anniversary of his birth.

In 1930, Forster began his 40-year relationship with Bob Buckingham (1904–1975), a married policeman. Forster was both the witness to Buckingham's marriage to May Hockey in 1932 and the godfather of their son, Robert Morgan, the following year. While living at King's College, he spent weekends with the family and included both husband and wife in his circle, which included J. R. Ackerley, a writer and literary editor of The Listener, the psychologist W. J. H. Sprott, and for a time, the composer Benjamin Britten.

In the early years, Forster was jealous of May, but over time they too grew close. After a fall in April 1961, he spent his final years in Cambridge at King's College, but in his final years, having suffered a series of strokes, May insisted that he move into the family home where she could look after him. Forster died of a stroke on 7 June 1970 at the age of 91, at the Buckinghams' home in Coventry, Warwickshire. His ashes, mingled with those of Buckingham, were later scattered in the rose garden of Coventry's crematorium, near Warwick University.

== Bibliography ==
=== Novels ===
- Where Angels Fear to Tread (1905)
- The Longest Journey (1907)
- A Room with a View (1908)
- Howards End (1910)
- A Passage to India (1924)
- Maurice (written in 1913–14, published posthumously in 1971)

=== Short stories ===
- The Celestial Omnibus: And Other Stories (1911)
- The Eternal Moment and Other Stories (1928)
- Collected Short Stories (1947) a combination of the above two titles, containing:
  - "The Story of a Panic"
  - "The Other Side of the Hedge"
  - "The Celestial Omnibus"
  - "Other Kingdom"
  - "The Curate's Friend"
  - "The Road from Colonus"
  - "The Machine Stops"
  - "The Point of It"
  - "Mr Andrews"
  - "Co-ordination"
  - "The Story of the Siren"
  - "The Eternal Moment"
- The Life to Come and Other Stories (1972) (posthumous) containing the following stories written between approximately 1903 and 1960:
  - "Ansell"
  - "Albergo Empedocle"
  - "The Purple Envelope"
  - "The Helping Hand"
  - "The Rock"
  - "The Life to Come"
  - "Dr Woolacott"
  - "Arthur Snatchfold"
  - "The Obelisk"
  - "What Does It Matter? A Morality"
  - "The Classical Annex"
  - "The Torque"
  - "The Other Boat"
  - "Three Courses and a Dessert: Being a New and Gastronomic Version of the Old Game of Consequences", of which Forster wrote The Second Course (The First Course was written by Christopher Dilke, The Third Course by A. E. Coppard and The Dessert by James Laver)

=== Plays and pageants ===
- Abinger Pageant (1934)
- England's Pleasant Land (1940)

=== Film scripts ===
- A Diary for Timothy (1945) (directed by Humphrey Jennings, spoken by Michael Redgrave)

=== Libretto ===
- Billy Budd (1951) (with Eric Crozier; based on Melville's novel, for the opera by Benjamin Britten)

=== Collections of essays and broadcasts ===
- Abinger Harvest (1936)
- Two Cheers for Democracy (1951)
- The Prince's Tale and Other Uncollected Writings (1998)
- Forster in Egypt: A Graeco-Alexandrian Encounter: E.M. Forster's First Interview, eds., Hilda D. Spear and Abdel-Moneim Aly (London, 1987)
- The Uncollected Egyptian Essays of E. M. Forster, eds., Hilda D. Spear and Abdel-Moneim Aly (Dundee, 1988)

=== Literary criticism ===
- Aspects of the Novel (1927)
- The Feminine Note in Literature (posthumous) (2001)
- The Creator as Critic and Other Writings Archived 9 May 2015 at the Wayback Machine

=== Biography ===
- Goldsworthy Lowes Dickinson (1934)
- Marianne Thornton, A Domestic Biography (1956)

=== Travel writing ===
- Alexandria: A History and Guide (1922)
- Pharos and Pharillon (A Novelist's Sketchbook of Alexandria Through the Ages) (1923)
- The Hill of Devi (1953)

=== Miscellaneous writings ===
- What I Believe (1938), a short essay espousing humanism
- Selected Letters (1983–85)
- Commonplace Book (facsimile ed. 1978; edited by Philip Gardner, 1985)
- Locked Diary (2007) (held at King's College, Cambridge)
- Arctic Summer (novel fragment, written in 1912–13, published posthumously in 2003)
- Rooksnest (1894 and 1901), a description by Forster of his childhood home, on which he based Howards End.
- Nassenheide (1920–1929), a memoir of his time as governor to Elizabeth von Arnim's children, notable for its contrast to Elizabeth and Her German Garden. Held at King's College.
- The Forster–Cavafy Letters: Friends at a Slight Angle, edited by Peter Jeffreys (2009). The correspondence between Forster and Constantine P. Cavafy, whom he got to know in Alexandria during his time there in the First World War.

A wide variety of other journals, plays, and draft fiction are archived at King's College.

== Notable films and drama based upon Forster's fiction ==
- The Machine Stops (1966), dramatised for the BBC anthology series Out of the Unknown
- A Passage to India (1984), dir. David Lean
- A Room with a View (1985), dir. James Ivory
- Maurice (1987), dir. James Ivory
- Where Angels Fear to Tread (1991), dir. Charles Sturridge
- Howards End (1992), dir. James Ivory
- Howards End (2017), BBC One miniseries, dir. Hettie MacDonald
- The Inheritance (2018), play by Matthew Lopez, adapted from Howards End, and featuring Forster as a character

Non-profit organisation positions
Preceded by Thornton Wilder	President of PEN International; 1946–1947	Succeeded by François Mauriac
