= What I Believe (E. M. Forster essay) =

1938 essay by E. M. Forster

"What I Believe" is the title of a 1938 essay espousing humanism by E. M. Forster.

== Forster's essay ==
E. M. Forster says that he does not believe in creeds; but there are so many around that one has to formulate a creed of one’s own in self-defense. Three values are important to Forster: tolerance, good temper, and sympathy.

It was first published in The Nation on July 16, 1938. Hogarth Press republished it for general sale in 1939.

=== Personal relationships and the state ===
Forster argues that one should invest in personal relationships: "one must be fond of people and trust them if one is not to make a mess of life". In order to do so, one must be reliable in one's relationships. Reliability, in turn, is impossible without natural warmth. Forster contrasts personal relationships with causes, which he hates. In an often quoted sentence he argues: "If I had to choose between betraying my country and betraying my friend I hope I should have the guts to betray my country". He goes on to explain:

Such a choice may scandalize the modern reader, and he may stretch out his patriotic hand to the telephone at once and ring up the police. It would not have shocked Dante, though. Dante places Brutus and Cassius in the lowest circle of Hell because they had chosen to betray their friend Julius Caesar rather than their country Rome.

=== Democracy ===
Forster cautiously welcomes democracy for two reasons:

- "It starts from the assumption that the individual is important" (at least more than authoritarian regimes) and "that all types are needed to make a civilization", which he first loosely summarizes as variety and liberty and then as individualism in the final paragraph
- It allows criticism.

Thus, he calls for "two cheers for democracy" (also the title of the book which contains his essay) but argues that this is "quite enough" and that "there is no occasion to give three."

Forster goes on to argue that, although the state ultimately rests on force, the intervals between the use of force are what makes life worth living. Some people may call the absence of force decadence; Forster prefers to call it civilization.

=== Great men, Forster's aristocracy, and public life ===
Forster also criticises hero-worship and profoundly distrusts so-called "great men". Heroes are necessary to run an authoritarian regime in order to make it seem less dull "much as plums have to be put into a bad pudding to make it palatable". As a contrast Forster believes in an "aristocracy", not based on rank or influence but an aristocracy of the sensitive, the considerate and the plucky. For Forster it is a tragedy that no way has been found to transmit private decencies into public life:

The more highly public life is organized the lower does its morality sink; the nations of today behave to each other worse than they ever did in the past, they cheat, rob, bully and bluff, make war without notice, and kill as many women and children as possible; whereas primitive tribes were at all events restrained by taboos. It is a humiliating outlook—though the greater the darkness, the brighter shine the little lights, reassuring one another, signalling: "Well, at all events, I'm still here. I don't like it very much, but how are you?"

=== Individualism ===
Forster concludes by stating that these "are the reflections of an individualist and a liberal" who has "found liberalism crumbling beneath him", taking comfort from the fact that people are born separately and die separately. Therefore, no dictator will be able to eradicate individualism.

Forster did not consider himself a visionary.

== Bibliography ==
- Forster's "What I Believe" is published in: Forster, E. M., Two Cheers for Democracy, ISBN 0-15-692025-5, and also in: Forster, E. M., What I Believe, and other essays, ISBN 978-1-911578-01-7.
- What I Believe – E. M. Forster's essay [abridged]
