= Notre Dame College of Education =

Notre Dame College of Education may refer to:

- Notre Dame College of Education (Liverpool), a predecessor of Liverpool Hope University
- Notre Dame College of Education (Glasgow), a predecessor of the University of Glasgow

== See also ==
- Collège Notre-Dame du Sacré-Cœur
- University of Notre Dame
