= Mary Lescher =

Mother superior and school founder

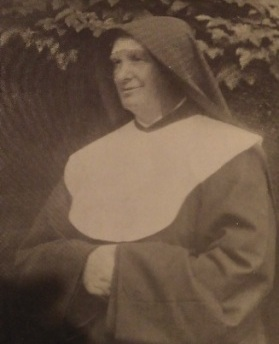
- Born: 1846; Hampstead
- Died: 7 May 1927; Dowanhill
- Education: St Dominic's Priory School

Mary Adela Lescher SND known as Mary of St Wilfrid (1846 – 7 May 1927), was a British Mother Superior, a school founder and a college head in Glasgow. A window dedicated to her is in the National Museum of Ireland and the Notre Dame High School continues in Glasgow.

== Early life and education ==
Lescher was born in Hampstead. She was the middle child of five born to Sarah (born Harwood) and Joseph Sidney Lescher. Her father was a keen Catholic and after two years of their marriage her mother was too. Her father was a director of the medical supply company Evans, Lescher and Evans in London.

She was taught at home until her mother died when she was about ten and the family returned from France where they had been living for her mother's benefit. She went to a Benedictine school in Winchester, Hampshire and briefly to St Dominic's Priory School. In 1864 she was again home schooled by a tutor.

== Religious life and teaching career ==
Lescher had previously been taught by an aunt who was a nun. She had two cousins in the Institute of Notre Dame and one was head of their Notre Dame Teacher Training College in Mount Pleasant, Liverpool. Lescher went to Namur in Belgium as she had decided to also join the order. There at the mother house of the Notre Dame order she joined the order in May 1869. She came back to Britain in 1871 as Sister Mary of St Wilfrid to teach at the Notre Dame Roman Catholic Girls' School in Clapham, London. She got rheumatic fever and she went to Liverpool to recover.

In 1894 Archbishop Eyre of Glasgow invited the Sisters of Notre Dame to send nuns from the convent in Liverpool to establish a community in Glasgow. Lescher was assigned the task. Lescher opened the Notre Dame Training College in 1893 at Dowanhill and there were four sisters to assist. They began teaching in January 1895. Having a female head of a college was said to be the only occurrence at the time. The Chief Inspector of schools reported that her facility had "exceptional excellence".

In 1897 the Notre Dame High School was opened as a private secondary and Montessori school. She developed the school using the ideas of Montessori and having a science laboratory installed for her students.

== Death and legacy ==
She retired as Sister Superior in 1919 and she died in 1927 at Glasgow's Notre Dame Convent. A stained glass window had been commissioned by Lescher from Harry Clarke to remember WWI but it was decided that the "Mother of Sorrows" should be created in honour of Mary of St Wilfred. Her family motto "Singulariter in Spe" (Firmly Established in Hope) is included below an image of the Pietà. The window was installed for many years in the College Chapel of Notre Dame in Dowanhill. The window was sold in 2002 and has been on permanent display in the National Museum of Ireland since 2017.
