= Thomas Alleyne =

English priest (c.1488–1558)

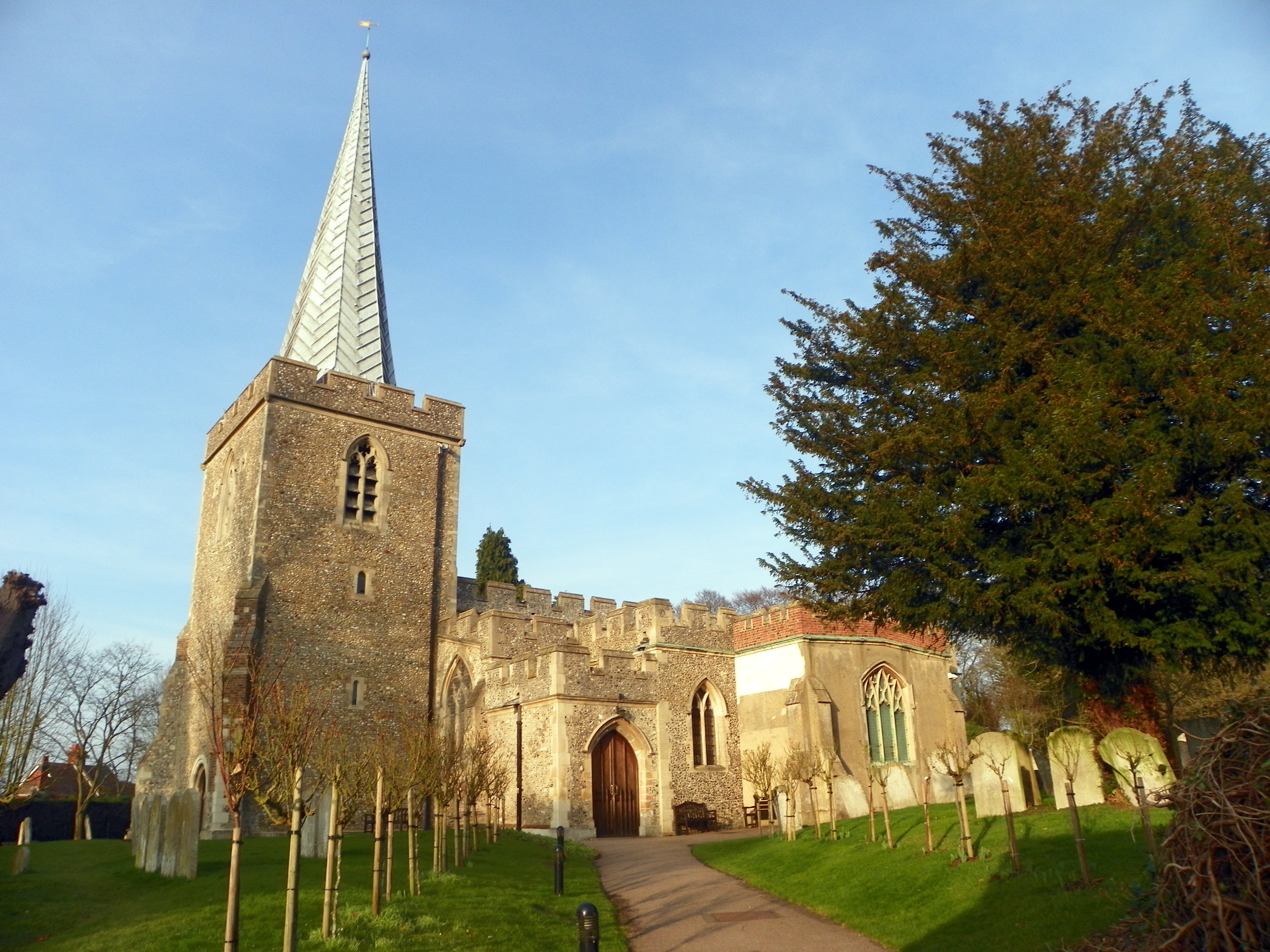
St Nicholas' Church

Thomas Alleyne (c. 1488 – 1558) was an English priest of the sixteenth century. He is remembered for founding schools.

Details of his early life are lacking, although he appears to have had roots in Staffordshire where he later endowed two schools. The Oxford Dictionary of National Biography states that he was probably born in Sudbury (on the border between Staffordshire and Derbyshire). He was possibly educated at Cambridge.

By 1526 Alleyne became rector of Stevenage, Hertfordshire. He was buried in St Nicholas' Church, Stevenage, although no memorial survives there.

== Legacy ==
In 1547, Thomas Alleyne received a legacy from his brother Ralph, who was interested in supporting charitable work. Ralph was a businessman who served as Sheriff of the City of London.

Thomas Alleyne may have supported schools during his lifetime, but what is known for certain is that three schools were endowed under the terms of his will. They are:

- The Thomas Alleyne Academy, Stevenage, Hertfordshire,
- Alleyne's Academy, Stone, Staffordshire
- Thomas Alleyne's High School, Uttoxeter, Staffordshire.

Alleyne created statutes for the schools and left property to Trinity College, Cambridge in order to support them. They remained under the governorship of Trinity College until the twentieth century when they were drawn into the state system of education.
