= St Dominic's Priory School, Stone =

St Dominic's Priory School

Location
- 37 Station Road; Stone, Staffordshire, ST15 8ER; England
- Coordinates: 52°54′38″N 2°08′27″W

Information
- Type: Private day school
- Motto: Laudare, Benedicere, Praedicare ("To Praise, To bless, To preach")
- Religious affiliation: Roman Catholic
- Established: 1843; 183 years ago
- Founder: Margaret Hallahan
- Local authority: Staffordshire
- Department for Education URN: 124476 Tables
- Headteacher: R. Harrison
- Staff: 45
- Gender: prev.Girls; Coeducational up to age 16
- Age: Pre-school to 16
- Enrolment: c. 200
- Houses: Hallahan; Ullathorne
- Colour: Blue
- Website: www.stdominicspriory.co.uk

St Dominic's Priory School is an independent Catholic day school in the town of Stone, Staffordshire, halfway between Stoke-on-Trent and Stafford. The school buildings are set near to the grounds of St Dominic's Convent.

The school was founded by the Dominican Sisters and still maintains a close affiliation with the resident community and with St Mary's Nursing Home and the Parish Church of the Immaculate Conception and St Dominic, the centre of an active Catholic community with a resident priest and deacon. It is joined onto this Convent founded by Margaret Hallahan.

== History and Ethos ==
Within the grounds stands the small chapel of St Anne designed by Pugin. This school chapel was the centre of the Catholic mission started by Blessed Dominic Barberi in 1843 and continues to be a place of pilgrimage. Both the parish church and the chapel are used by the school for Mass and other services. The buildings have Grade II listed status and house various and important stained glass, statues and gargoyles, as assigned in Public sculpture of Staffordshire and the Black Country (G. Noszlopy, F. Waterhouse, 242).

According to the school history, it was founded after a young girl, the niece of one of the sisters, refused to leave the convent, and holding onto the railings, and she was then educated there. The school was opened in 1934, although the Dominican Sisters have long been educating children on the convent grounds. In 2011 the sisters announced that the congregation could no longer financially support the school and would have to close it. Parents mobilised to form a charitable trust with the support of the Sisters, school staff, alumni and the local community. As a result the school was able to remain open under the management of the new trust.

The school is now coeducational and accommodates pupils from Pre-school to the age of 16. The school is non-selective, accepting children of all abilities and all faiths. The school was ranked 2nd best in Staffordshire for Maths and English GCSE results in 2019 and was defined as excellent in their last ISI Inspection which is equivalent to outstanding in Ofsted. ISI made the following comments – 'Students are industrious and work effectively both independently and with others.' 'The quality of academic and other achievements is excellent.' 'Students are mature for their age and confident in approaching different subjects. They display strong communication skills, speaking articulately and enthusiastically.' . The school's motto is "Laudare, Benedicere, Praedicare" : "To Praise, to Bless, to Preach",

== Alumni ==
- Mary Lescher (1846-1927) - religious educator
- A. N. Wilson (b. 1950) - writer and newspaper columnist
