= Russell Flower =

English cricketer

Personal information
- Full name: William Russell Flower
- Born: 6 November 1942 (age 84); Stone, Staffordshire, England
- Batting: Left-handed
- Bowling: Slow left-arm orthodox

Domestic team information
- Years: Team
- 1982: Minor Counties
- 1978: Warwickshire
- 1964–1988: Staffordshire

Career statistics
Competition	First-class	List A
Matches	9	6
Runs scored	23	20
Batting average	5.75	10.00
100s/50s	–/–	–/–
Top score	10*	9*
Balls bowled	1,038	282
Wickets	10	2
Bowling average	55.40	93.00
5 wickets in innings	–	–
10 wickets in match	–	–
Best bowling	3/45	2/34
Catches/stumpings	–/–	1/–
- Source: Cricinfo, 20 June 2011

Russell William Flower (born 6 November 1942) is a former English cricketer. Flower was a left-handed batsman who bowled slow left-arm orthodox. He was born in Stone, Staffordshire.

Flower made his debut for Staffordshire in the 1964 Minor Counties Championship against Norfolk. Flower played Minor counties cricket for Staffordshire from 1964 to 1988, which included 107 Minor Counties Championship matches. and 4 MCCA Knockout Trophy matches. Following success with over the course of a decade with Staffordshire, Flower played first-class cricket for Warwickshire in 1978, making his debut against Surrey. Flower played 9 first-class matches that season, although without success. He took just 10 wickets at an expensive average of 55.40, with best figures of 3/45. Dropped midway through the season, Flower never appeared again for Warwickshire.

Continuing his Minor counties career with Staffordshire, he proceeded to make his List A debut for the Minor Counties cricket team against Yorkshire in the 1982 Benson & Hedges Cup. He made a further appearance for the team in that season's competition against Leicestershire. He played his first limited overs match for Staffordshire against Gloucestershire in the NatWest Trophy. He made 3 further List A appearances for the county, the last coming against Surrey in the 1988 NatWest Trophy. Like in his first-class career, Russell struggled against first-class opposition. He took just 2 wickets in List A cricket, at an expensive average of 93.00 runs per wicket. It was only in one of his six matches that he took wickets, taking 2/34 against Glamorgan in the 1986 NatWest Trophy.
