= The Thomas Alleyne Academy =

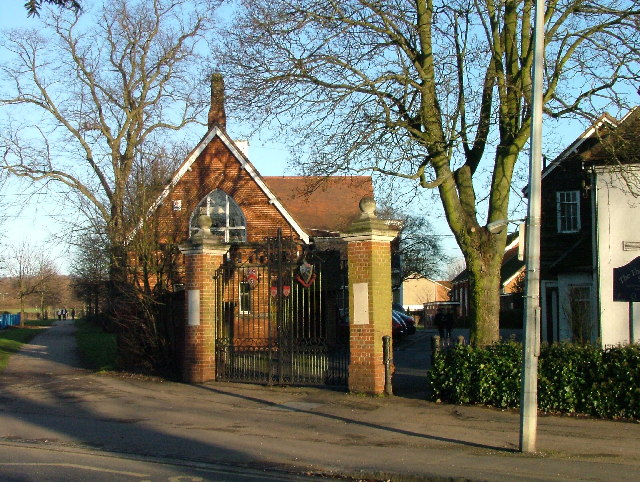
- Front gates

Location
- High Street; Stevenage, Hertfordshire, SG1 3BE; England; 51.914961°N 0.20822°W

Information
- Type: Academy,
- Motto: Achieving excellence through personal growth.
- Established: 1558; 468 years ago
- Founder: Reverend Thomas Alleyne
- Department for Education URN: 140037 Tables
- Ofsted: Reports
- Chair of Governors: Hilary Clifford
- Head teacher: Melanie Cook
- Staff: 100
- Gender: Mixed
- Age: 11 to 18
- Enrolment: 1,011
- Houses: Darwin; Franklin; Newton
- Colour: Navy Blue
- Website: www.tas.herts.sch.uk

The Thomas Alleyne Academy is an academy in Stevenage, Hertfordshire, England. It was founded in 1558, when the original school was set up from the will of Thomas Alleyne. It become an academy in 2013.

It is situated at the northern end of Stevenage High Street, in Stevenage Old Town, adjacent to the roundabout of the A1072 and the A602 (former A1), and more than 200 metres to the east of the East Coast Main Line.

The academy has 180 in each year group and is a popular school, with Year 7 places usually oversubscribed. The school was inspected by Ofsted in October 2019 and retained a 'Good' rating.

In 2017 the school converted all lighting to LED; a project funded by The Educational Social Enterprise Fund for LED Lighting. In the same year the school moved their heating system from gas to Biomass fuel. The biomass system is fuelled with wood pellets obtained from sustainable forests. In the summer of 2020, the 1950s science block was renovated using a Capital Improvement Fund government grant, upgrading the outdated 1950s labs.

The current head teacher at the Thomas Alleyne Academy is Mrs Melanie Cook since 2025

== History ==
The school was founded in 1558 and named after Thomas Alleyne, who was rector of Stevenage. In his will, Thomas Alleyne left money that was used to found Master Allen's school. The name was changed to Alleyne's Grammar School in 1869.

=== 20th Century ===
Francis Cammaerts (1916–2006), French Resistance leader and witness in the Lady Chatterley's Lover Trial, was headmaster from 1952 to 1961. Francis Cammaerts was the author Michael Morpurgo's uncle. Morpurgo wrote a fictional story based on his uncle's experiences in WWII 'In the Mouth of the Wolf'.

The Vincent motorcycle factory was based in the current Thomas Alleyne Academy reception between 1928 and 1955. There is a plaque on the reception building commemorating the Vincent motorcycle champion George Brown

In 1969 the school became a comprehensive, Alleyne's School. In 1989 it merged with Stevenage Girls' School and changed to its name to Thomas Alleynes School.

=== 21st Century ===
In 2008, the school became a Specialist Science College and received funding from the Department for Children, Schools and Familie to upgrade Science and ICT facilities.

During the summer of 2012, Thomas Alleyne's was chosen to choose a torchbearer to run with the torch for the 2012 Summer Olympics.

The school became an Academy in 2013, in partnership with the Hart School Trust The school is still on the site it has occupied for four and a half centuries, a short walk both from Thomas Alleyne's Church and from his home.

== Academy Status ==
In March 2013, the School (as it was then known) requested to turn into an Academy.

On Sunday 1 September 2013, Alleynes became an academy, with links to North Hertfordshire College. This means that the academy is now funded directly by central government and not the Local Authority, allowing Alleynes more control over finances and their curriculum.

== Notable former pupils ==
=== Alleyne's Grammar School ===
- Sir Henry Chauncy, historian
- Geoffrey Howard, grandson of Sir Ebenezer Howard, pioneer of garden cities
- Harry Bates, 1850 to 1899, one of the finest English artists of the nineteenth century
- Ken Hensley 1956–1961, of the rock band Uriah Heep.

=== Alleyne's School ===
- Graham Poll, referee

=== Thomas Alleyne School ===
- Rebecca Paul 1991-1998, member of parliament for Reigate

== Notable former Staff ==
- Roger Luxton (OBE) principal adviser and finally director of children's services at Barking and Dagenham, former school governor
- Tony McWalter MP for Hemel Hempstead from 1997 till 2005. Worked at the school from 2005 till 2019
- Francis Cammaerts (Headmaster) Special Operations Executive Agent during World War II

== See also ==
- Alleyne's Academy
- Thomas Alleyne's High School

== News items ==
- https://www.thecomet.net/news/education/stevenage-s-thomas-alleyne-school-and-airbus-flying-challenge-5425308

Stevenage students off to a flying start with Airbus mentoring scheme (Oct 2019)

- http://www.thecomet.net/news/gcse_results_thomas_alleyne_stevenage_1_1491162

Student from the Thomas Alleyne School carries Olympic Torch through Stevenage Old Town

- http://www.106jack.com/news/local-news/olympic-torch-relay-meet-hertfordshires-torchbearers/

MP Praises Thomas Alleyne students on a school charity day to raise money to "Send my friend to school"

- http://www.theadvertisergroup.co.uk/Education-and-Training/MP-praises-pupils-support-of-poor-African-students-18072012.htm
