= Tom Fishwick =

English cricketer

Personal information
- Full name: Tom Silvester Fishwick
- Born: 24 July 1876; Stone, Staffordshire, England
- Died: 21 February 1950 (aged 73); Sandown, Isle of Wight
- Batting: Right-handed
- Role: Batsman

Domestic team information
- Years: Team
- 1896–1909: Warwickshire
- First-class debut: 24 August 1896 Warwickshire v Derbyshire
- Last First-class: 6 August 1909 Warwickshire v Gloucestershire

Career statistics
Competition	First-class
Matches	210
Runs scored	8833
Batting average	26.28
100s/50s	13/45
Top score	140*
Balls bowled	30
Wickets	–
Bowling average	–
5 wickets in innings	–
10 wickets in match	–
Best bowling	0/4
Catches/stumpings	231/2
- Source: CricketArchive, 8 October 2013

Tom Silvester Fishwick (24 July 1876 – 21 February 1950) was an English cricketer. He was a middle-order right-handed batsman and an occasional wicketkeeper who played first-class cricket for Warwickshire between 1896 and 1909, and captained the side in the 1902 season and in part of 1907. He was born in Stone, Staffordshire, and died at Sandown, Isle of Wight. His first name, registered as such, was "Tom", not "Thomas".

Fishwick was educated at Wellingborough School and played in the inaugural Minor Counties Championship in 1895 for his native Staffordshire. he was described in The Times as "Mr Fishwick of Handsworth-wood" at the time of his first first-class match for Warwickshire in 1896. In the game, against Derbyshire, he scored 55, the top score of the single innings completed as rain wiped out most of the first and all of the last day. After this promising start, Fishwick's career failed to develop in the next two seasons and he did not improve on his highest score in this period.

From 1899, Fishwick appeared pretty regularly in the Warwickshire team, and started making serious runs. His first century was an innings of 109 in the match against Hampshire at Edgbaston in July 1899, putting on 182 for the fourth wicket with Willie Quaife, though that partnership was overshadowed by the unbroken 194 that Quaife, who made 207, later put on with Alfred Glover in the same match. There were centuries in the next two seasons as well, and the unbeaten 140 that he made in the game against Derbyshire in 1901 proved to be the highest of his career: the 361 runs Warwickshire made in that innings came in just over 90 overs, a prodigious rate of scoring for the time, and Fishwick was known at the time as a fast scorer and a powerful hitter. He was less successful in 1902 and 1903 but had his best seasons with the bat in 1904 and 1905, passing 1,000 runs in these two years with the 1905 aggregate of 1440 runs at an average of 32.00 and with four centuries his best. Fewer matches in 1906 meant that his aggregate dropped, but his batting average of 41.77 for that season was his best in any single season. Thereafter his record fell away and he scored no more centuries. In addition to his batting, Fishwick was also a fine fielder at slip and the 40 catches he took for Warwickshire in 1905 (41 in all matches in the season) remained the county record until beaten by Alan Townsend in 1951.

As an amateur and a regular player, Fishwick captained Warwickshire frequently from 1900 onwards, but was officially captain in 1902 only, though the increasingly irregular appearances of the official captain James Byrne in 1906 and 1907 meant that he was often called on to deputise. Unlike other amateurs of the period, he played very little cricket away from Warwickshire: one match for W. G. Grace's London County in 1901 in which he scored a century; a game for "An England XI" in 1905, plus one for "Gentlemen of the South" in the same year; and a final match for J. Bamford's XI in 1907.

== Outside cricket ==
In the 1901 census, Fishwick is listed as being a "grain merchant" and is living in Edgbaston, Birmingham with his wife Ruth and a baby daughter.

Fishwick left county cricket after the 1909 season and became secretary of the Hunstanton Golf Club, later moving to the Isle of Wight where he was secretary of the Shanklin and Sandown Golf Club. In the 1911 census he was living at Hunstanton with his wife, two daughters and a son.
