= Arthur Fernie =

English cricketer and educator

Personal information
- Full name: Arthur Ernest Fernie
- Born: 9 April 1877; Stone, Staffordshire, England
- Died: 24 July 1959 (aged 82); Bideford, Devon, England
- Batting: Right-handed
- Bowling: Slow left-arm orthodox

Domestic team information
- Years: Team
- 1897–1900: Cambridge University
- 1898–1900: Staffordshire
- 1901: Marylebone Cricket Club
- 1907: Berkshire

Career statistics
Competition	First-class
Matches	22
Runs scored	121
Batting average	7.56
100s/50s	0/0
Top score	24
Balls bowled	2,897
Wickets	61
Bowling average	25.54
5 wickets in innings	1
10 wickets in match	0
Best bowling	6/104
Catches/stumpings	11/–
- Source: Cricinfo, 6 February 2019

Arthur Ernest Fernie (9 April 1877 – 24 July 1959) was an English first-class cricketer and educator.

The son of James Fernie, he was born at Stone, Staffordshire in April 1877. He was educated at Wellingborough School, before going up to Clare College, Cambridge in 1896.

He made his debut in first-class cricket for Cambridge University in 1897 against CI Thornton's XI at Cambridge. He played first-class cricket for Cambridge until 1900, making a total of 21 appearances. A slow left-arm orthodox bowler, Fernie took 60 wickets for Cambridge, with came at an average of 24.81. He took one five-wicket haul when he took 6 for 104 against AJ Webbe's XI in 1900. He gained his Blues' in cricket in 1897 and 1900. He played one first-class match for the Marylebone Cricket Club in 1901 against London County. In addition to playing at first-class level, Fernie also played minor counties cricket for Staffordshire in 1898 and 1900, and for Berkshire in two matches in 1907.

After graduating from Cambridge, Fernie became a teacher. He was an assistant master at Lambrook School in Berkshire. He died at Bideford in Devon in July 1959.
