= Windows in the West =

1993 painting by Avril Paton

Windows in the West by Avril Paton. Watercolour on paper, 1993. Kelvingrove Art Gallery and Museum, Glasgow.

Windows in the West is a 1993 watercolour painting by the Scottish artist Avril Paton. The painting was bought by the city of Glasgow for the Glasgow Gallery of Modern Art, and has been displayed at the Kelvingrove Art Gallery and Museum.

== Description ==
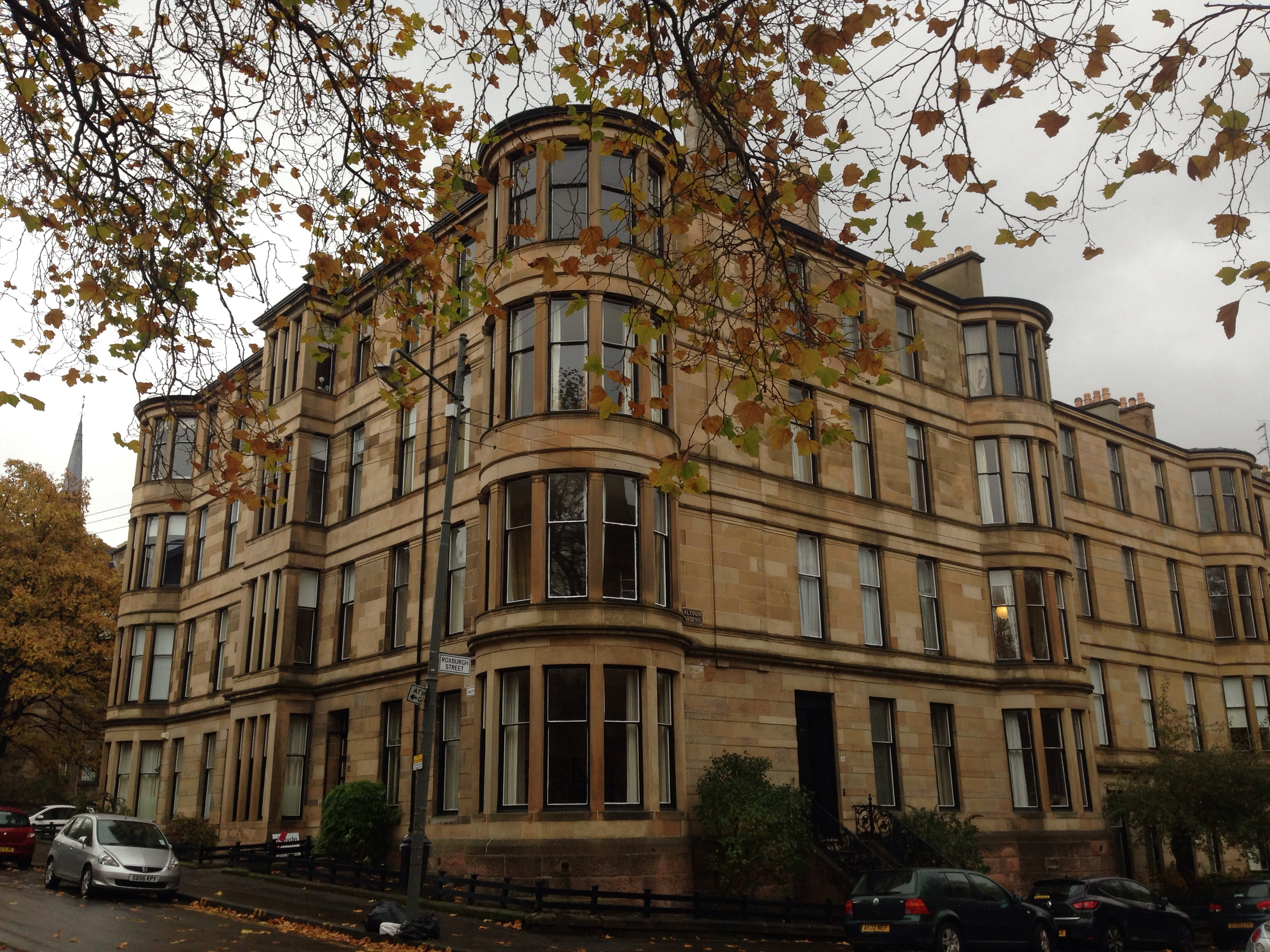
35 Saltoun Street in September 2016.

The painting depicts the external profile of a four-storey yellow sandstone tenement building during winter; the residents of the building can be seen doing various activities, with a mother and child, a man at a computer, and someone pulling aside curtains to look out at the snow outside. Paton depicted herself standing outside the door of the building in the painting, and later found out that a cat she thought she had seen was actually made from china. The painting is painted in gouache, egg tempera and watercolour, measures 5 by 4 ft (1.5 by 1.2 m) and took six months to complete.

The Scotsman newspaper wrote of Windows in the West in 2005 that "There was something cosily familiar about the painting's cheery, glowing character, the snow-covered roof and the warm yellow stone, the embracing perspective. ...It carries a nostalgic, storybook charm; Katie Morag in Glasgow's West End".

The building depicted in the painting is located at 35 Saltoun Street on the corner of Roxburgh Street in the Dowanhill district in Glasgow's West End, and is a Category B listed building. It was built in 1897.

== History ==
Paton was living as a caretaker of a top floor flat opposite the building on Saltoun Street on 11 January 1993, when at 5.30 pm, during a heavy blizzard, she saw 35 Saltoun Street "transformed" with a "lilac pink sky, lighted windows, clarity of whiteness, lots of people at home" according to Melanie Reid who interviewed Paton in 2005 for The Herald. The preliminary drawings for the paintings were completed in February and Windows in the West was finally finished in June. Paton had not set out to create such a large work, originally intending to paint the architectural detail of the building's drum windows. Paton said in 2005 that she had "realised I had made a mistake with the size of the paper. At that time I was terribly poor ... Buying art materials was difficult. I was upset that the paper was the wrong size", but was galvanised to finish the work by her son who said "Oh it would be great if you could pull it off!"

It was originally planned to show the painting at Anne Mendelow's Gatehouse Gallery at Glasgow's Rouken Glen Park but Mendelow proposed that it was loaned to Glasgow Royal Concert Hall in the intervening period as it was taking up so much space in Paton's flat. The popularity of Windows in the West at the Royal Concert Hall bought it to the attention of the director of Glasgow's museums, Julian Spalding, who purchased it for the city in 1996. Spalding subsequently said that "What it caught was that moment when it was nearly dark, but people haven't drawn the curtains yet, and you can walk along the street and look into windows, and there's the light inside, and the light outside. People are going about their business in a private way; at the same time they have not yet hidden their private world. There is the balance between the inner life and the outer life that is just beautifully caught". Paton's 1988 painting The Barras had previously been bought by Glasgow Art Galleries and Museums and as her major sale it had established her as an artist.

Paton subsequently described the residents as having been "thrilled to be in the painting ... That building was a community in itself. They were colourful characters, who were always having parties". Paton has described her surprise at the popularity of the work, saying in a 2005 interview that "I find that quite amazing, because I don't understand it at all. I wasn't aware that it was going to be anything other than just another painting for an exhibition. I lived there for four to six years before I started the painting. I used to look at that building continually and enjoy it. I enjoyed seeing what people were doing. I would stand in the window, drink a cup of tea. Once it was painted, I never looked at it again".

In a May 2007 article for the Evening Times, Shelia Hamilton interviewed residents of the building depicted in Windows in the West who recalled their memories of Paton and the effect of the painting on their lives. Hamilton wrote that "Maybe the day will come when there's a plaque on the wall ... and we get guided tours. But for now, all most of us can do is wander along the street just round the corner from the Byres Road and have a quick peek as we pass by and wonder what it's like to live inside a painting" and described the building as "probably the most famous tenement in the world". Hamilton attributed the painting's appeal to the fact that "they are real people living real lives and the reason why this picture has such a hold on the public's imagination. Outside, it may be icy in the painting but inside the rooms they are cocooned forever in safety and warmth". Paton said in a 2005 interview that "I haven't distanced myself from it; the picture has distanced itself from me. It's like a child. It goes off and leads its own life".

Paton has sold almost 30,000 prints and 100,000 cards of reproductions of the painting; in 2005 it was the top selling print in Glasgow's Gallery of Modern Art shop.

Windows in the West featured in a 2005 poll by The Herald newspaper to find Scotland's favourite painting, and as a result of which subsequently inspired a poem by the Poet Laureate of Scotland, Edwin Morgan.
