= Notre Dame High School, Glasgow =

Coordinates: 55.878°N 4.299°W

Notre Dame High School

Location
- 160 Observatory Rd, Glasgow; Scotland

Information
- Type: Local state school (local catchment area)
- Motto: Ah Qu'il Est Bon Le Bon Dieu (Oh how good is the good God)
- Established: 1897; 129 years ago
- Founder: Mary Lescher
- Head teacher: Rosemary Martin
- Teaching staff: 65 FTE
- Enrolment: 717
- Campus: Observatory Road
- Houses: Namur, St Julie, Joseph, Marian
- Colours: Brown, Blue, Gold
- Nickname: ND, NDHS
- Website: Official website
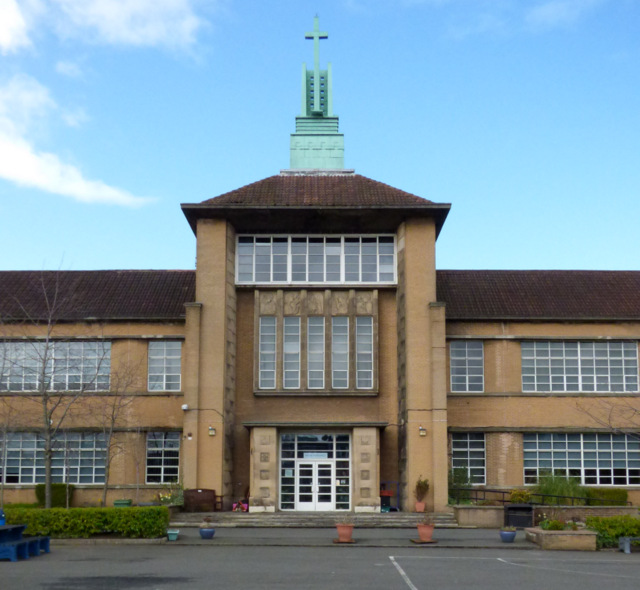
- Notre Dame High School

Notre Dame High School is a local, catchment-based, state funded Catholic-ethos secondary school for both girls and boys, located on Observatory Road in Glasgow, Scotland. It was founded in 1897 as a fee paying school for girls. Notre Dame High was the last remaining single sex council school in Scotland until November 2019.

== History ==
In 1894, Archbishop Eyre of Glasgow invited Mary Lescher and the Sisters of Notre Dame to come from the Mother House in Liverpool to establish a community in Glasgow. The Notre Dame Training College was opened in 1893 at Dowanhill and began teaching in January 1895. In 1897, Notre Dame School was opened as a private secondary and Montessori school, with a roll of 24 pupils, instructed by two teachers. By 1912, the number of pupils had risen to 193. Overcrowding led to proposals for a new building. This was designed by Thomas Cordiner in 1939, but due to the outbreak of war, construction was delayed, and the building opened in 1953. In 1987, the school was protected as a category A listed building. At the same time, proposals to close the school were defeated. The former high school building and adjoining primary school building and church were damaged in a fire on 12 June 2010.

A stained glass window dedicated to the school's founder, Mary Lescher, was sold and is on permanent display in the National Museum of Ireland.

The single-sex entry criterion has been a controversial issue. Local parents campaigned for the school to become co-educational in the 1990s but the bid failed at Council committee level.

In 2016, a new campaign group of local school parents (NDH4ALL) was established to ask Glasgow City Council to reconsider the single sex entry criteria and allow access to both girls and boys in the local catchment area.

A public consultation on Notre Dame High's entry criteria was launched in March 2019 and ran for a period of 10 weeks. The consultation received a high level of publicity and engagement, with almost 5,000 responses counted. Glasgow City Council also conducted three high profile public meetings during the consultation period. The meetings saw attendance in the hundreds with many pupils speaking of their experiences.

Consultation results were released in August 2019 revealing that, of the three options proposed, co-education received the highest number of responses (45.7%).

In November 2019 a consultation response report was published by Glasgow City Council Education Services in conjunction with Education Scotland. The report recommended that Notre Dame High become co-educational. A final vote on the recommendation by the Glasgow City Council City Administration Committee took place on 28 November 2019, with the committee unanimously voting to make the school co-educational.

The Head Teacher is Mrs Rosemary Martin who succeeded Philomena McFadden in 2014.

== Alumnae ==
- Lady Elish Angiolini, former Lord Advocate of Scotland
- Maureen Beattie, Actress
- Helena Carroll, Actress
- Marcella Evaristi, Playwright
- Anne Ferguson (1941-1998), physician, clinical researcher and expert in inflammatory bowel disease.
- Clare Grogan, Singer, actress
- Kate Robinson, Sculptor

== See also ==
- List of Category A listed buildings in Glasgow
- List of post-war Category A listed buildings in Scotland
