= Notre Dame College of Education (Glasgow) =

Former Catholic teacher college

- Type: Teacher training college
- Active: 1895–1981
- Religious affiliation: Roman Catholic
- Location: Stockiemuir Road, Bearsden, Scotland; 55.9283°N 4.3458°W

Notre Dame College of Education was a Catholic teacher training college in Glasgow, Scotland. It was opened in 1895 as a women's college by the Sisters of Notre Dame de Namur, admitting male students from 1967 and merging with Craiglockhart College in 1981 to become St Andrew's College of Education. St Andrew's College became the Faculty of Education of the University of Glasgow in 1999.

== Background ==
The first training college for male Catholic teachers in the United Kingdom, St Mary's College in London, opened in 1850. It was followed by two colleges for women teachers: Mount Pleasant College in Liverpool in 1856 and Wandsworth College in London in 1874. As there were no Catholic training colleges in Scotland, teachers at Catholic schools in Scotland trained at the English colleges. In 1872 a Scottish education act set up a Scotch Education Department and made primary education between the ages of five and thirteen free and compulsory.

== Dowanhill ==
In 1891 the Roman Catholic Archdiocese of Glasgow set up a committee to plan for a "Training College for Schoolmistresses" following a recommendation from the Scottish Education Department. Dowanhill in the West End of Glasgow was chosen for its existing schools, its closeness to the University of Glasgow and its tram network. In 1894 Archbishop Eyre of Glasgow invited Mary of St Wilfrid (Mary Lescher) and the Sisters of Notre Dame to come from the Mother House in Liverpool to establish a community in Glasgow. The Notre Dame Training College for women was opened in 1893, and began teaching in January 1895. It was the first Catholic teacher training college in Scotland. Lescher served as principal from 1893 until her retirement in 1919. In 1920 the Catholic colleges in Scotland became the responsibility of a National Committee for the Training of Teachers, with four provincial committees, corresponding to the four ancient universities of Scotland.

The college's first building was two adjoining villas, East and West Dowanside, built in around 1855 and acquired in 1893 and 1894. A red sandstone extension was added in 1896. In 1897 Notre Dame School was opened as a private secondary and Montessori school. A chapel designed by Pugin & Pugin with a schoolroom below it was added in 1900. The college site at Dowanhill closed in 1979 and the former college buildings were listed in 2004.

== Bearsden ==
In 1874, the Archbishop of Glasgow, Charles Eyre originally established St Peter's College, a Catholic seminary, in Partickhill. In 1892, he decided to move it to Bearsden, a town northwest of Glasgow.

In 1966, to replace the seminary, a new campus for Notre Dame College of Education was built on the site. It was designed by the same architects as St Peter's Seminary, Cardross, the firm of Gillespie, Kidd & Coia (GKC). It was built in a U-shape, with two teaching blocks, a physical education building and five student accommodation buildings. The complex was opened in 1969. Male students were admitted from 1967. On 4 March 1998, the residential blocks were registered as category A listed buildings.

In 1981, Notre Dame College merged with Craiglockhart College to form St Andrew's College of Education, a national Catholic college which joined with University of Glasgow to become its Faculty of Education in 1999. In 2002, the teaching college was relocated and the site was declared surplus to university requirements. After negotiations between Historic Scotland and East Dunbartonshire Council, it was decided to demolish the site and build residential accommodation and a new Bearsden Academy.

== Notable alumni ==
- Bill Butler, politician
- Anne McGuire, politician
- Rosemary McKenna, politician
- Monica Taylor, protozoologist
