= John Sterne (bishop of Colchester) =

The last Tudor suffragan bishop

John Sterne was appointed Bishop of Colchester to deputise within the Diocese of Ely under the provisions of the Suffragan Bishops Act 1534 in 1592 and held the post until his death in 1607. Educated at Trinity College, Cambridge and ordained in 1554 he was Rector of Stevenage at St Nicholas' Church, then Rickmansworth before his Consecration at All Saints Church, Fulham.
