= Thomas Alleyne's High School =

Location
- Back Lane; Uttoxeter, Staffordshire, ST14 8DU; England
- Coordinates: 52.901376°N 1.862907°W

Information
- Type: Academy
- Motto: Nisi Dominus Frustra (Without the Lord, everything is in vain.)
- Established: 1558; 468 years ago
- Local authority: Staffordshire County Council
- Trust: Innovate2Educate i2E (Previously Uttoxeter Learning Trust)
- Department for Education URN: 144002 Tables
- Ofsted: Reports
- Headteacher: Lou Heywood
- Gender: Coeducational
- Age: 13 to 18
- Enrolment: 1350
- Houses: Elkes, Orme, Torrance & Whitmore
- Colours: Red, Green, Blue & Yellow
- Website: http://www.thomasalleynes.uk/

Thomas Alleyne's High School (TAHS) is a coeducational upper school and sixth form located in Uttoxeter, Staffordshire, England. It is one of three schools founded in 1558 from the will of Thomas Alleyne. It has four different coloured houses: Elkes (Red), Orme (Green), Torrance (Blue) and Whitmore (Yellow). The school celebrated its 450th anniversary in 2008.

== Rankings and results ==
The 2011 Ofsted Report showed the school was good overall with some outstanding features; mentioned "The effectiveness of the school's engagement with parents and carers". However, the sixth form was only rated satisfactory.

In 2011 there was a drop in the school's exam results by 7% from the previous year with 51% of students achieving 5 or more GCSEs grades A-C compared to a national average of 58.2%.

The school ranked 47th out of 121 schools located within Staffordshire (students achieving 5 or more A* - C GCSEs) and the percentage of children achieving maths and English GCSEs (A* - C) was below both the national and local authority averages for state funded schools.

Following on from the previous years results mentioned above, in August 2012 the school achieved its best results in history, with 77% of students achieved "five or more A* - C grades and 68 per cent and more than 300 students achieving these with higher grades in Maths and English"

== Academics ==
In addition to the core subjects of English, Maths, Science, RE, PE and MFL for GCSE students the school also offers a broad range of other courses, including the International Baccalaureate. From 2013 the school offers a BTEC course in Health & Social Care and IT is now offered as a Cambridge qualification.

The school has a S.E.N (Special Educational Needs) department, and was recently given the status of being dyslexia-friendly. For 2011, the school's pupil characteristics show that the number of children with SEN is well below both the national and local authority averages. The number of children receiving free school meals is less than half of the local authority average and less than a third of the state average.

The school was in the news in 2010 when a teacher was found to be having an inappropriate relationship with a student. He appeared at Stafford Crown Court in 2010 and pleaded not guilty but changed his plea to guilty on 19 May 2011. He was sentenced to 15 months in prison and banned from working with children for life on 24 June 2011.

=== Staff development award ===
During 2011, and in recognition of its development of staff, the school became one of the first schools in Staffordshire to receive a prestigious "quality" mark.

=== Academy status ===
In 2013 the school announced a consultation into plans to become an academy. The school formally converted to academy status in April 2017 and is now sponsored by the Uttoxeter Learning Trust.

=== External charity work ===
The school plays a key role in supporting the local teenager support group YESS (Youth Emotional Support Service). Particularly, by raising funds to support the charity through its first year. In March 2013, another group of VIth Form students participated in a charitable event eventually raising more than £900 for local charities.

== See also ==
- Alleyne's Academy
- The Thomas Alleyne Academy
