= Anne Ferguson (physician) =

Scottish physician and researcher

Anne Ferguson FRCPG FRCP FRCPE FRCPath FRSE
- Born: 21 July 1941; Glasgow, Scotland
- Died: 21 December 1998 (aged 57); Edinburgh, Scotland
- Education: University of Glasgow
- Occupations: physician, academic
- Years active: 1969–1998
- Known for: research into coeliac disease and oral tolerance
- Relatives: John Ferguson (1966–1989 his death) (husband); Gerald Collee (1995–1998 her death) (husband)
- Medical career
- Field: mucosal immunology, gastroenterology
- Institutions: Western Infirmary; University of Edinburgh; Western General Hospital
- Awards: Brunton Medal, University of Glasgow; Sir Francis Avery Jones research medal of the British Society of Gastroenterology

Anne Ferguson (26 July 1941 – 21 December 1998) was a Scottish physician, clinical researcher and expert in inflammatory bowel disease. She was considered one of the most distinguished gastroenterologists in Britain.

== Early life and education ==
Anne Glen was born in Glasgow in 1941. Her parents were Monica and John Glen. She was educated at Notre Dame High School and the University of Glasgow, graduating with a first class honours BSc in physiology in 1961, followed in 1964 with a MB ChB with honours. She won the Brunton Medal for the most distinguished graduate in medicine at the university.

== Career and research ==
In 1969, after completing her medical training, she became a lecturer at the Department of Bacteriology and Immunology in Glasgow's Western Infirmary teaching hospital. While working at the hospital she carried out research on the role of intra-epithelial lymphocytes in intestinal immunity, receiving her PhD in 1974.

In 1975, she was appointed as a senior lecturer at the University of Edinburgh, also becoming a consultant at the Gastrointestinal Unit at the Western General Hospital in Edinburgh. In 1987 she was appointed to a personal professorship in gastroenterology. From 1991 to 1994 she was head of the Department of Medicine at the university.

She published more than 250 papers in peer-reviewed academic journals, published three books and contributed chapters to many other books.

Her research provided new insights into the mechanisms responsible for Crohn's and coeliac diseases which led to significant advances in the therapy of these conditions. She also carried out significant research on oral tolerance.

She served on the Committee on Safety of Medicines, the Medical Research Council Gene Therapy Advisory Board, and the Spongiform Encephalopathy Advisory Committee. At the time of her death she was president of the Society for Mucosal Immunology. She was a consultant providing advice and training to the International Centre for Diarrhoeal Disease Research in Bangladesh.

== Awards and honours ==
- Brunton Medal
- 1979, Sir Francis Avery Jones research medal of the British Society of Gastroenterology, the highest research award that the national gastroenterology body confers on its researchers.
- Fellowships:

- Royal Colleges of Physicians of Glasgow (1975)
- London (1977)
- Edinburgh (1981)
- Royal College of Pathologists (1984)
- Fellow of the Royal Society of Edinburgh (1990)

The Anne Ferguson building at the Western General Hospital, Edinburgh, is named after her.

== Personal life ==
In 1966, she married John Ferguson, a sociology lecturer at the University of Strathclyde, and together they adopted two children, a girl and a boy. John Ferguson died of cancer in 1989. She married Professor Gerald Collee, emeritus Professor of Medical Microbiology at the University of Edinburgh in 1995.

In her youth, Ferguson represented the University of Glasgow in athletics as a middle-distance runner. She was also on the Scottish women's basketball team. She enjoyed hill walking and mountaineering, and once visited the Himalayas with her first husband.

Ferguson died of pancreatic cancer in Edinburgh on 21 December 1998.
