= Terry Darlington =

Author

Terry Darlington (died 21 October 2025) was the author of three best-selling books Narrow Dog to Carcassonne (2004), Narrow Dog to Indian River (2006) and Narrow Dog to Wigan Pier (2013). These books, which humorously (and frequently poetically) describe his narrowboat travels with his wife Monica and pet whippet Jim, have sold over a million copies to date.

Darlington was brought up in Pembroke Dock, in Wales. He gained a State Scholarship to Oxford, where he obtained a degree in English. He worked for Lever Brothers for eight years before moving to Stone, teaching at the Stoke on Trent College of Technology. Although he wished to be a poet, he "had three kids" and instead in 1976 he and his wife Monica founded a market research company, Research Associates. He was a founder member of the Stone Master Marathoners running club. Having kept a diary of his narrowboat voyage to Carcassonne, he studied creative writing before eventually producing his first book.

In 2009 the Darlingtons' narrow boat, Phyllis May, was destroyed by fire while moored in the Canal Cruising Company's boatyard in Crown Street, Stone. The fire, which had started in a nearby boat, spread to an adjacent one and then to the Phyllis May, which was gutted from bow to stern. It was replaced by Phyllis May II.

== Narrow Dog to Carcassonne ==
On their retirement, and against the advice of many, Terry and Monica Darlington decided to sail their canal narrowboat across the English Channel from Dover to Calais. Entering the French canal system, they went north to Belgium and then south towards the Mediterranean, via the Burgundy canal and the Saône and Rhône rivers. They then took the Phyllis May via Sète and the Étang de Thau to Carcassonne, on the Canal du Midi. Accompanying them on the voyage was their pet whippet Jim – the "narrow dog" of the book's title.

This very successful book received glowing reviews from (inter alia), the Sunday Telegraph, the "Good Book Guide", Joanna Lumley, "Canal & Riverboat", The Guardian, and "The Whippet".

== Narrow Dog to Indian River ==
Inspired by the success of his first book, the Darlingtons navigated the US Intracoastal Waterway from Norfolk, Virginia to the Gulf of Mexico.

== Narrow Dog to Wigan Pier ==
Darlington's third book is about the loss of the Phyllis May in a fire, and two summers spent exploring the northern canals of England in the boat's replacement, Phyllis May II, (which was built at Longport Wharf in Stoke on Trent). Compared to the previous two books, this third volume of the trilogy has rather more autobiographical material, covering Darlington's market research business, and the Stone Master Marathoner running club that he founded for the "more elderly athlete".
