= Augusta Theodosia Drane =

English writer and nun (1823–1894)

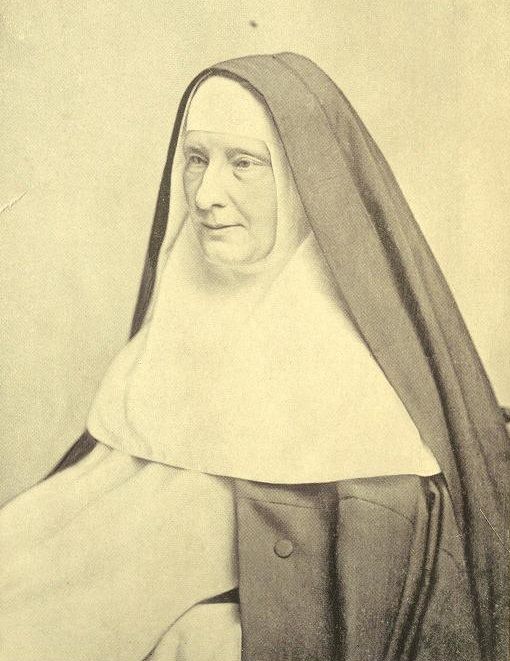
- Portrait of Drane
- Born: 18 December 1823; Middlesex, England
- Died: 29 April 1894 (aged 70)
- Occupations: Nun; poet; theologian

Augusta Theodosia Drane, OP (28 December 1823 – 29 April 1894) was an English Catholic nun, poet and theologian.

== Life ==
Born at Bromley, now Bromley-by-Bow, then in Middlesex, now in London, she was the youngest daughter of Thomas Drane, an East Indian mercantile executive, and brought up in the Anglican faith. She was taught initially at home and then for two years at a Kensington school. Her father's extensive library encouraged her reading and studying habits. The family moved to Babbacombe, Devon, when she was 14.

Drane was influenced by Tractarian teachings and joined the Catholic Church in Tiverton around 1850. In 1852, after a six-month stay in Rome, she joined the third order of St Dominic, to which she belonged for over forty years. She was prioress of the convent in Stone, Staffordshire, where she died aged 70.

== Works ==
Drane wrote, and published anonymously, an essay questioning the morality of Tractarianism, which was attributed to John Henry Newman. Her major works in prose and verse are: The History of Saint Dominic (1857; enlarged edition, 1891); The Life of St Catherine of Siena (1880; 2nd ed., 1899); Christian Schools and Scholars (1867); The Knights of St John (1858); Songs in the Night and Other Poems (1876); and the Three Chancellors (1859), a sketch of the lives of William of Wykeham, William of Waynflete and Sir Thomas More.

A complete list of her writings appears in Memoir of Mother Francis Raphael, O.SD., Augusta Theodosia Drane, edited by B. Wilberforce, O.P. (London, 1895).
