= Monica Taylor =

English biologist (1877 – 1968)

- Born: 1 November 1877; St Helens, Merseyside
- Died: 1968 (aged 90–91)
- Education: University of London; University of Glasgow
- Awards: Patrick Neill medal, Royal Society of Edinburgh
- Scientific career
- Fields: Protozoology
- Workplaces: Notre Dame College of Education (Glasgow)
- Academic advisors: John Graham Kerr

(Sister) Monica Taylor (1877 – 1968) was an English protozoologist. After a struggle to pursue higher education as a nun of the Order of Notre Dame de Namur, and being arrested during World War II on suspicion of being a German parachutist in disguise, she received several honours for her work in the field of amoebic zoology.

== Early life ==
She was born on 1 November 1877 in St Helens, Lancashire to science teacher Joseph Taylor and his wife Agnes, née Picton. Her father, her industrial chemist uncle, and her cousin, the chemist Hugh Stott Taylor, are cited as influences on her interest in science.

In the late 1890s she attended Mount Pleasant College, Liverpool, a teacher training college founded by the Sisters of Notre Dame. She then joined the Order of Notre Dame as a nun in 1900 in Belgium.

== Struggle for education in Glasgow ==
From 1901 she attended Notre Dame College of Education in Dowanhill, Glasgow. At first, not being granted permission to attend classes at the University of Glasgow, she became an external student of the University of London, but was unable to make progress because of the limited laboratory facilities at Notre Dame College. She was then permitted to use the laboratories at Glasgow with a chaperone. After the intervention of biologist John Graham Kerr, who was Regius Professor of Natural History at Glasgow at the time, she was finally allowed to attend lectures at Glasgow, accompanied by her chaperone and, allegedly, separated from the other students by a curtain. She received her BSc with honours as an external student of the University of London in 1910. Combining teaching at Notre Dame with further study, she was awarded a DSc by the University of Glasgow in 1917.

== Protozoology ==
Taylor worked as a lecturer in science at Notre Dame College until 1946, and visiting lecturer at the Carnoy Institute, Louvain, Belgium, and Trinity Washington University.

Taylor worked especially on amoebae and polyploidy, but also on entomology. She developed laboratory growth materials for the large-scale farming of protozoa and curated her own natural history collection at Notre Dame College, from where she supplied amoeba material to other scientists.

In 1952 she served as Vice-President of the British Association for the Advancement of Science, and in 1954 – 7, as Vice-President of the Royal Society of Glasgow.

In 1953 she was awarded an Honorary DDL by the University of Glasgow as 'a protozoologist of international distinction.' In 1958 she also received the Patrick Neill medal from the Royal Society of Edinburgh 'in recognition of her distinguished contributions to Protozoology.'

=== Author ===
As well as numerous articles, Taylor published a popular biology textbook with C.H. Waddington.

Taylor was interested in her fellow Catholic biologist Bertram Windle, of whom she published a memoir compiled from his letters in 1932 and an article in Nature in 1958.
