= Alleyne's Academy =

Location
- Oulton Road; Stone, Staffordshire, ST15 8DT; England; 52°54′38″N 2°08′27″W

Information
- Type: Comprehensive; Academy
- Motto: Nisi Dominus Frustra
- Established: 1558; 468 years ago
- Founder: Thomas Alleyne
- Department for Education URN: 140123 Tables
- Ofsted: Reports
- Headteacher: Lindsay Tibbs
- Gender: Coeducational
- Age: 13 to 18
- Enrolment: c. 1000
- Website: http://www.alleynesacademy.co.uk/

Alleyne's Academy (formerly Alleyne's High School) is a coeducational secondary school and sixth form with academy status. It is located in Stone, Staffordshire, England, and is one of three schools founded in 1558 by Thomas Alleyne.

== History ==
It was founded in 1558 by Thomas Alleyne, who left money in trust for the foundation of a grammar school for boys in Stone, Stevenage and Uttoxeter. The school's original location in Stone was on part of the Stone Priory at a site beyond the Jervis Mausoleum until 1843. In 1843, a new building was constructed.

The School moved to its present site at Oulton Cross in 1889 on land given by Mary Forester (wife of George Weld-Forester, 3rd Baron Forester and daughter of Edward Jervis Jervis, 2nd Viscount St Vincent.) Staffordshire County Council took control of the school in 1924 and in 1951 the school was enlarged to include new classrooms and science laboratories. In the 1970s an addition of a theatre, classroom block and Sports Centre with a 25m swimming pool were built.

Alleyne's was designated a Specialist Technology Status in September 2003.

The school converted to academy status on 1 September 2013 and was renamed Alleyne's Academy.

The school badge itself represents the three schools, with three stars at the top of the badge. The school motto, used by all three schools, means 'without the lord everything is in vain'.

== Grounds ==
The main buildings consist of:

The Forrester Centre, dedicated to specialist technology subjects, such as: Electronics, Resistant Materials, Engineering, Woodwork, Metalwork, Textiles, Food, Vocational Art, Applied Art and Graphics. The building was opened by Lord Alex Bennett II and the large metal storage tin in the centre of the Quad was decorated with graffiti art on 10/12/2009 by a small group of Years 9 and 11 students.

The main school, which includes 3 floors, a library which recently was turned into a Sixth Form Quiet Study Area and Access Unit.

The Houseblock, consisting of a newly refurbished dining hall on the ground level, then maths rooms on the first and second floors. Also located on the first floor is the Learning Support Centre.

The Dove Studio, specially designed and refurbished, for drama purposes. It is equipped with special carpet and sound dampening on all walls, black out blinds, a lighting rig suspended from the ceiling and many power points around the room which can be used to plug floor standing lights in, all controlled from a Strand Lighting Desk. A sound system and stage blocks that can be used during performances.

The theatre is part of the main school building, this has a raised stage and raked seating for 200. Very recently the whole sound system has been replaced. The lighting is suspended above the stage on bars and there is also lighting in the ceiling of the theatre, all of which can be controlled from the control room. This has recently been refurbished with a brand new sound desk and amplifier and also includes a Strand lighting system. The theatre is also equipped with a loop system for people with hearing difficulties.

There is also the main school hall, which can seat around 300 people. This also has a reasonably sized stage, with house tabs at the front. The lighting in the hall is suspended from the ceiling above the stage and also from the walls of the hall, all of which can be controlled centrally using one of the Strand lighting desks.

Most, if not all of the classrooms in the school, are equipped with interactive whiteboards. There are also the English blocks and an extensive library in the school.

== Notable former pupils ==
- Maggie Alderson, journalist, magazine editor in Australia
- Chris Birchall, footballer
- Joe Clarke, canoeist- Olympic gold medallist
- Helen Morgan (née Halcrow), Lib Dem MP for North Shropshire, since 2021
- Prof Ian Morris (historian)
- Andy Wilkinson, footballer
- Adam Burgess (Canoeist/Olympic Silver Medallist)
- Dan Bigham (Olympic cyclist)

=== Alleyne's Grammar School ===
- Judy Bentinck (née Emerson), Countess of Portland, married to Tim Bentinck, 12th Earl of Portland, who plays David Archer in The Archers, and mother of Will Bentinck
- Frank Clewlow, radio producer in Australia

== See also ==
- The Thomas Alleyne Academy
- Thomas Alleyne's High School
