= Stone Meadows =

Nature reserve in Staffordshire, England

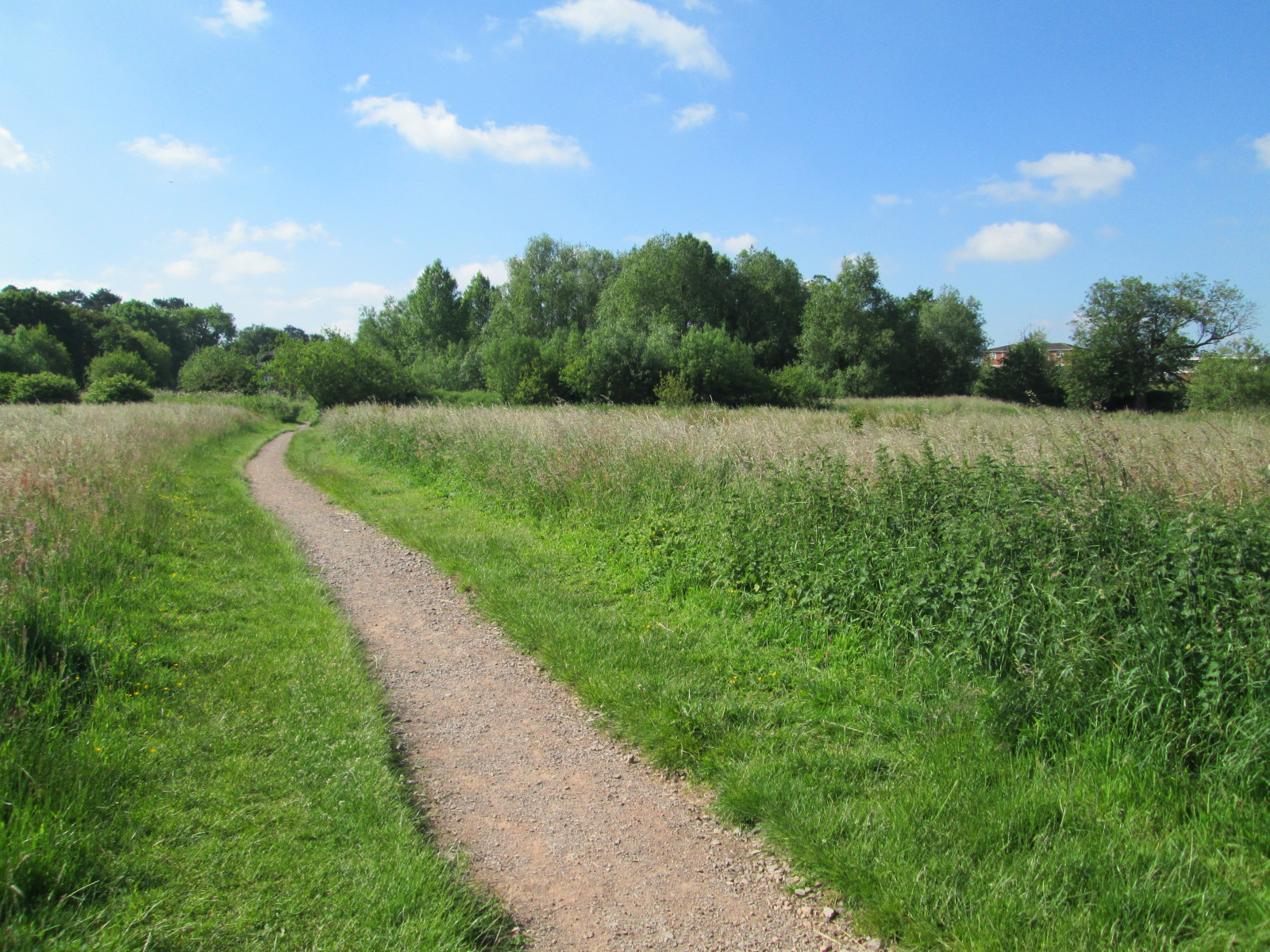
- Crown Meadow

- Location within Staffordshire
- Location: Stone, Staffordshire
- OS grid: SJ 901 336
- Coordinates: 52°53′59″N 2°8′55″W
- Designation: Local nature reserve
- Website: www.staffordbc.gov.uk/stone-meadows

Stone Meadows is a local nature reserve adjacent to Stone, in Staffordshire, England. There are three separate meadows by the River Trent. Goodall Meadow and Southern Meadow are reserves of Stafford Borough Council; Crown Meadow is a reserve of Stone Town Council.

== Description ==
=== Goodall Meadow ===
Also known as the Northern Meadow, at grid reference SJ 896 339. It is a mostly low-lying area, bisected by a railway line.

=== Crown Meadow ===
The central meadow, between the River Trent and the town, at grid reference SJ 901 336. It was bought in 1889 by John Joule and Sons, along with the Crown Hotel, and it was used by the hotel to exercise horses. It was bought by the Town Council in 1976.

It is an example of a floodplain meadow, most of which have been lost, along with the habitats of associated wildlife, since the 1940s because of changes in farming practices and drainage schemes. It is intended that, by sowing of wildflower seeds in recent years, the flora of a traditional floodplain meadow will be achieved.

=== Southern Meadow ===
At grid reference SJ 909 326. It is a low-lying area on the flood plain of the River Trent. It is mostly grassland. In the south-west there is wet woodland, mostly willow and alder, by two small ponds, with wetland plants including common bistort and marsh marigold. Around the wood is wet grassland, with plants including cuckooflower and meadowsweet.
