= Thomas Oldfield (Royal Marines officer) =

English major in the Royal Marines

- Born: 21 June 1756; Stone, Staffordshire
- Died: 1799 (aged 42–43)
- Occupation: Major in the Royal Marines

Thomas Oldfield (21 June 1756 – 1799) was an English major in the Royal Marines.

== Biography ==
Oldfield was the third son of Humphrey Oldfield, an officer in the Royal Marines. He was born at Stone, Staffordshire, on 21 June 1756. His mother was a daughter of Major-general Nicholls, of the Honourable East India Company's service. His father died in America shortly after the battle of Bunker's Hill. Oldfied accompanied his father to America in the autumn of 1774, or in the following spring. He served as a volunteer with the marine battalion at Bunker's Hill on 17 June 1775. In this action he was twice wounded, and his wrist was permanently injured. After the action Oldfield accepted a commission in a provincial corps - it is believed Tarleton's Legion. In 1775 he took up a commission in the Royal Marines which was intended for his brother, although it was by an error made out in his name.

Oldfield, who did not join the marines until the close of the American War of Independence, served with the 83rd regiment at the Siege of Charleston, South Carolina, in 1780. He was promoted to a first lieutenancy in the Royal Marines on 16 April 1778, and, being distinguished by his intelligence and gallantry, was placed on the stall of the quartermaster-general's department. As deputy assistant-quartermaster-general he was attached to the headquarters of the Marquis (then Lord) Cornwallis and to Lord Rawdon (afterwards Marquis of Hastings). He was constantly engaged under their immediate eye, and the repeatedly bore testimony to his zeal, gallantry, and ability. Oldfield was taken prisoner with Lord Cornwallis at the capitulation of Yorktown.

At the termination of the war Oldfield went to England, and was quartered at Portsmouth, when he purchased a small house in the parish of Westbourne. He named it Oldfield Lawn. In 1788 Oldfield went to the West Indies, returning in very bad health. In 1798 he was promoted captain, and again went to the West Indies in the Sceptre, 64 guns, Captain Dacres. In 1794 Oldfield commanded the Royal Marines landed from the squadron to co-operate with the army in the island of St. Domingo. Oldfield distinguished himself on every occasion that offered. In storming one of the enemy's works at Cape Nicholas mole, he was the first to enter it, and with his own hand struck the enemy's colours, which are now in possession of the family. He returned to England in the autumn of 1795 in precarious health.

In 1796 Oldfield was employed on the recruiting service at Manchester and Warrington. The following year he embarked on board the Theseus, 74 guns, and sailed to join the squadron under the orders of the Earl of St.Vincent of Cadiz. Upon the Theseus reaching her destination, she became the flagship of Horatio Nelson, then a rear-admiral. Oldfield was engaged in two bombardments of Cadiz in June 1797, in one of which he was wounded while in the host with the admiral.

Immediately after the second bombardment he sailed in the Theseus, accompanied by a small squadron, for Tenerife. In the pliant but unsuccessful attempt upon this island Oldfield commanded the force of Royal Marines which effected a landing from the squadron. His boat was swamped, but he swam to shore, and on landing received a contusion in the right knee. He materially contributed to the saving of the British detachment, whose temerity in attacking with so inferior a force was only equalled by the gallantry with which they carried the attack into execution. Its failure may be attributed to the loss of the cutter Fox, 10 guns, which was sunk by the enemy's fire, with a considerable part of the force destined for the enterprise. It was in this affair that Nelson lost his arm. In a private letter, written after the battle of the Nile, Oldfield said that "it was by no means so severe as the affair at Teneriffe, or the second night of the bombardment of Cadiz."

Until the Theseus was detached to join Nelson (who had shifted his flag to the Vanguard, and gone in pursuit of the French squadron up the Mediterranean), Oldfield remaining with the fleet under the orders of the Earl of St. Vincent. At the battle of the Nile Oldfield was the senior officer of Royal Marines in the fleet, and obtained the rank of major for his services, his commission dating 7 October 1798. Oldfield relates in a private letter how, after the disappointment of not finding the French fleet at Alexandria, the Zealous made the signal at midday on 1 August that it was in the bay of Aboukir. At half-past three the French fleet was plainly seen, and an hour afterwards Nelson bade the Theseus go ahead of him. Oldfield in the Theseus was alongside the Guerrier at a quarter to seven o'clock, and having poured in a broadside which carried away her mainmast and mizzenmast, he passed on to the Sparticle and anchored abreast of her, the admiral anchoring on the other side ten minutes later. After the action Oldfield was sent with his marines on board the Tonnant, and from 1 to 14 August he only occasionally lay down on deck. Upwards of six hundred prisoners were on board, of whom 150 were wounded. Nelson sent word to Oldfield that nothing would give him greater pleasure than to serve him; but Oldfield replied that he wanted nothing.

The Theseus remained for some time at Gibraltar and Lisbon to repair damages. Early in the spring of 1799 she sailed to join Sir Sidney Smith off the coast of Syria, and Oldfield took part in the defence of St. Jean d'Acre. On 7 April, at daybreak, a sortie in three columns was made, Oldfield commanding the centre column, which was to penetrate to the entrance of the French mine. The French narrative of General Berthier, chef d'état-major of the French army in Egypt, relates how Oldfield's column advanced to the entrance of the mine and attacked like heroes; how Oldfield's body was carried off by their grenadiers and brought to the French headquarters. He was dying when taken, and died before he reached headquarters. 'His sword,' says Berthier, 'to which he had done so much honour, was also honoured after his death. . . . He was buried among us, and he has carried with him to the grave the esteem of the French army.' His gallant conduct was eulogised in the official despatch of Sir Sidney Smith, and Napoleon, when on passage to St. Helena, spoke of Oldfield's gallantry to the marine officers on board the Northumberland.

Oldfield was of middle stature and dark complexion. He was of a social and generous disposition, and had a strong sense of religion. A tablet in his memory was erected in the garrison chapel at Portsmouth.
