= Stone, Staffordshire =

Market town in Staffordshire, England

Coordinates: 52.908012°N 2.144385°W

Stone
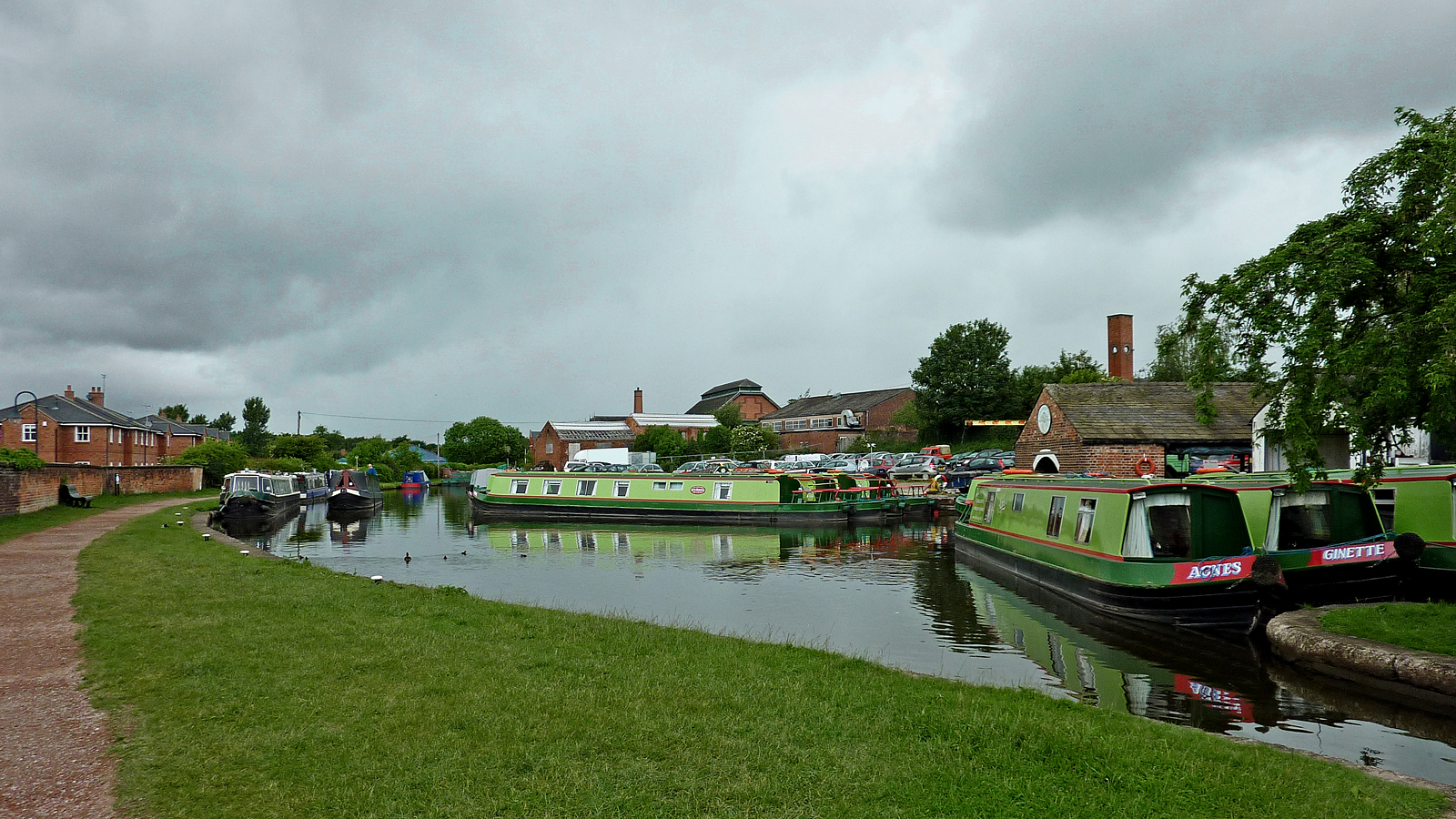
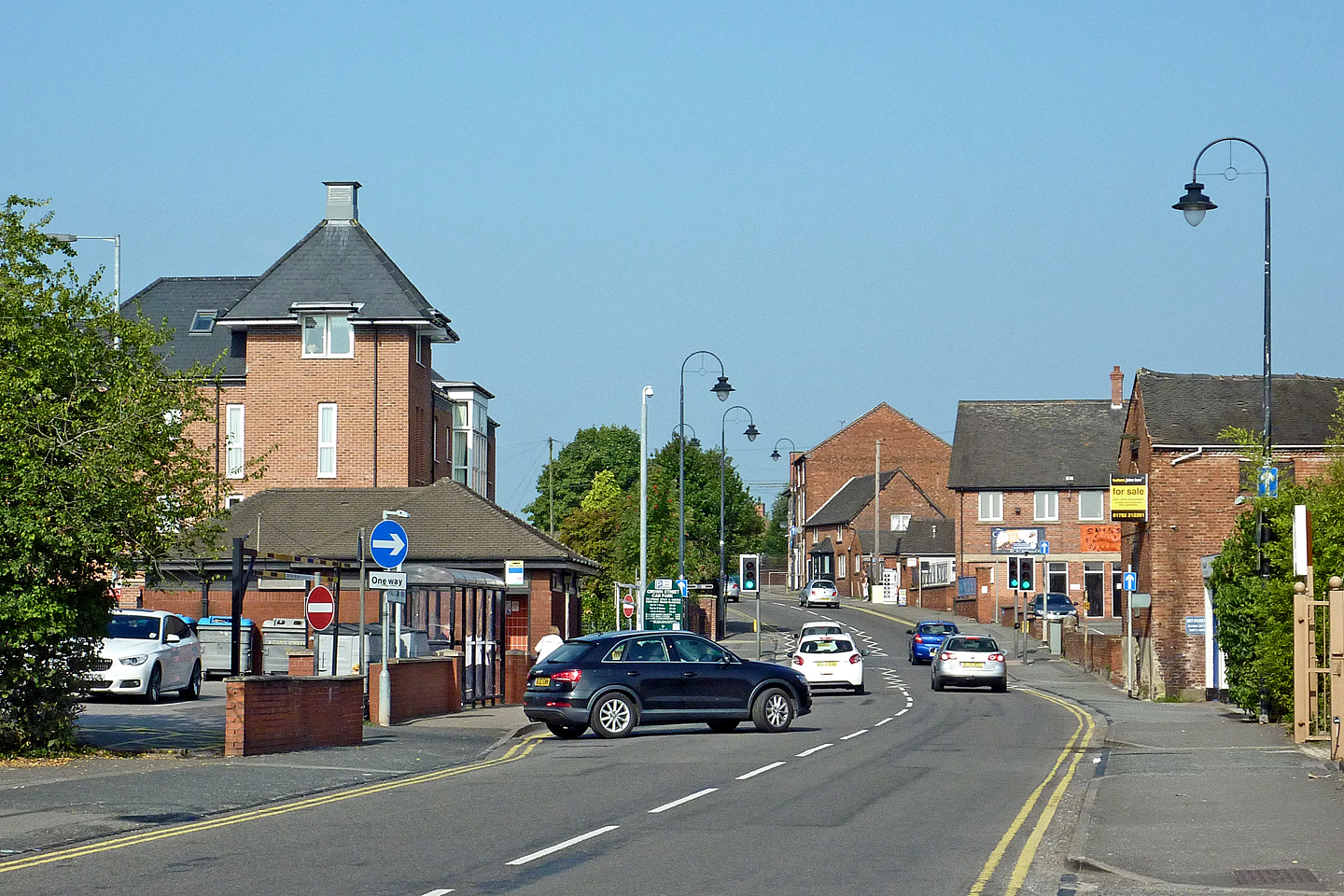
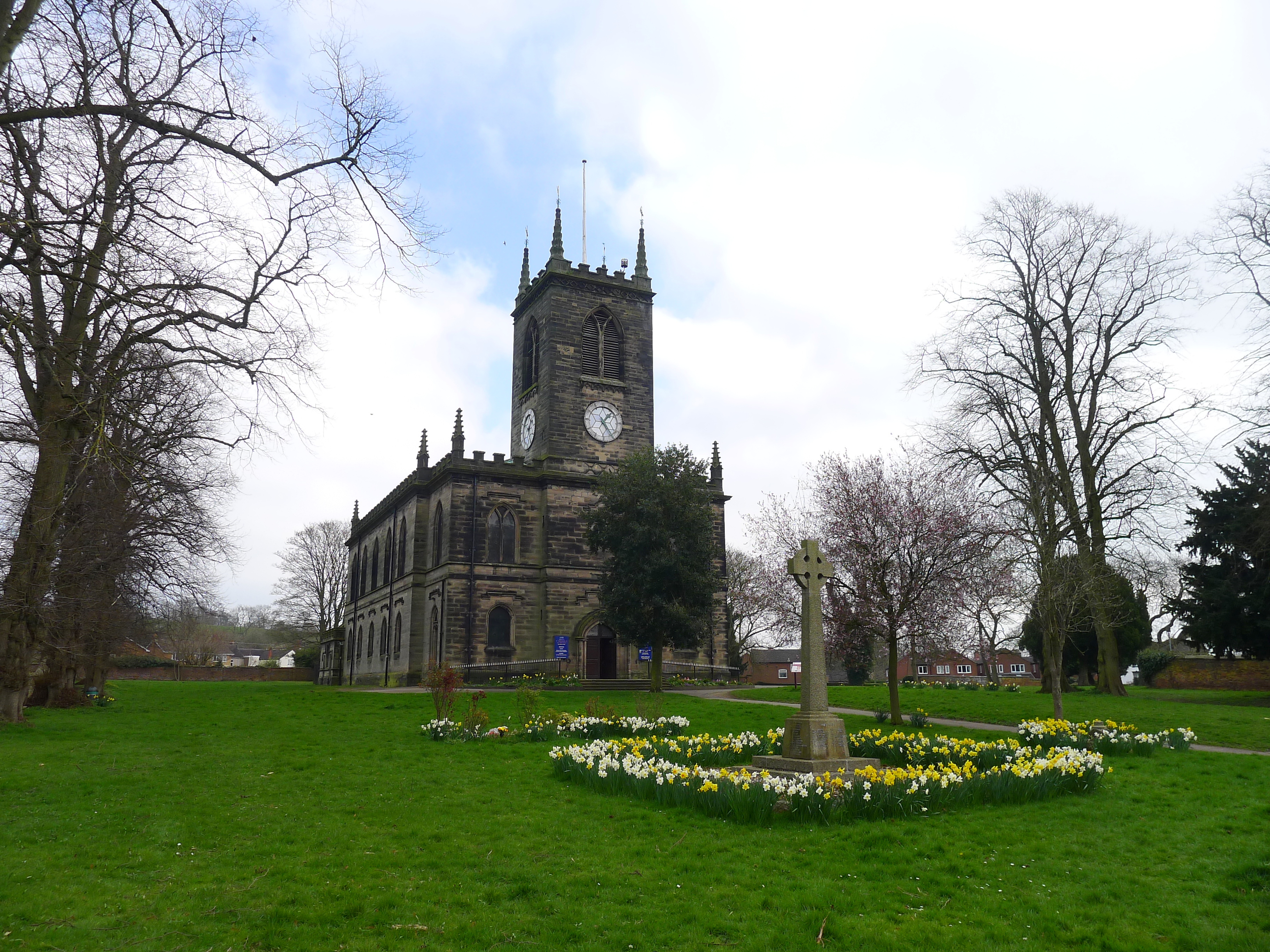
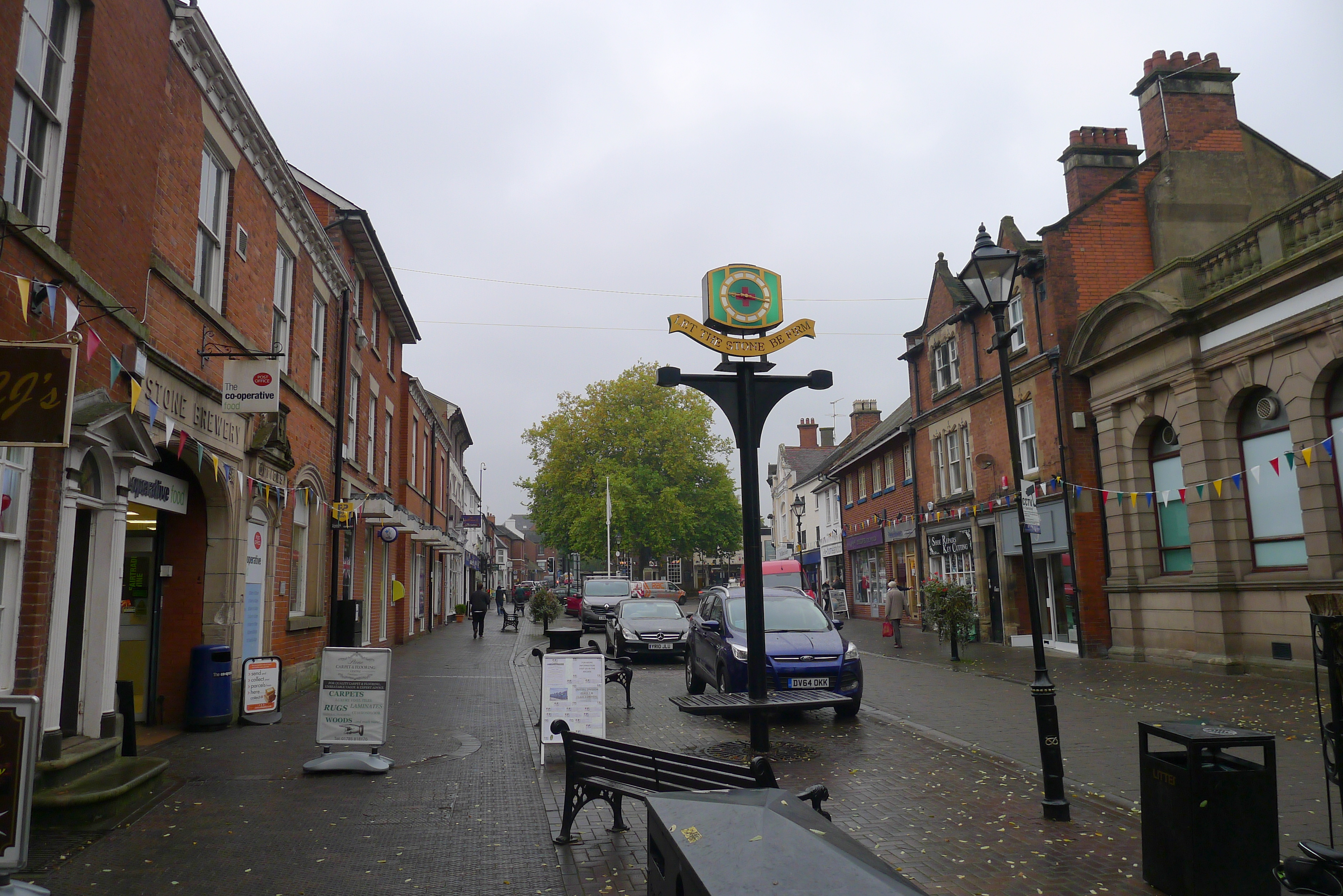
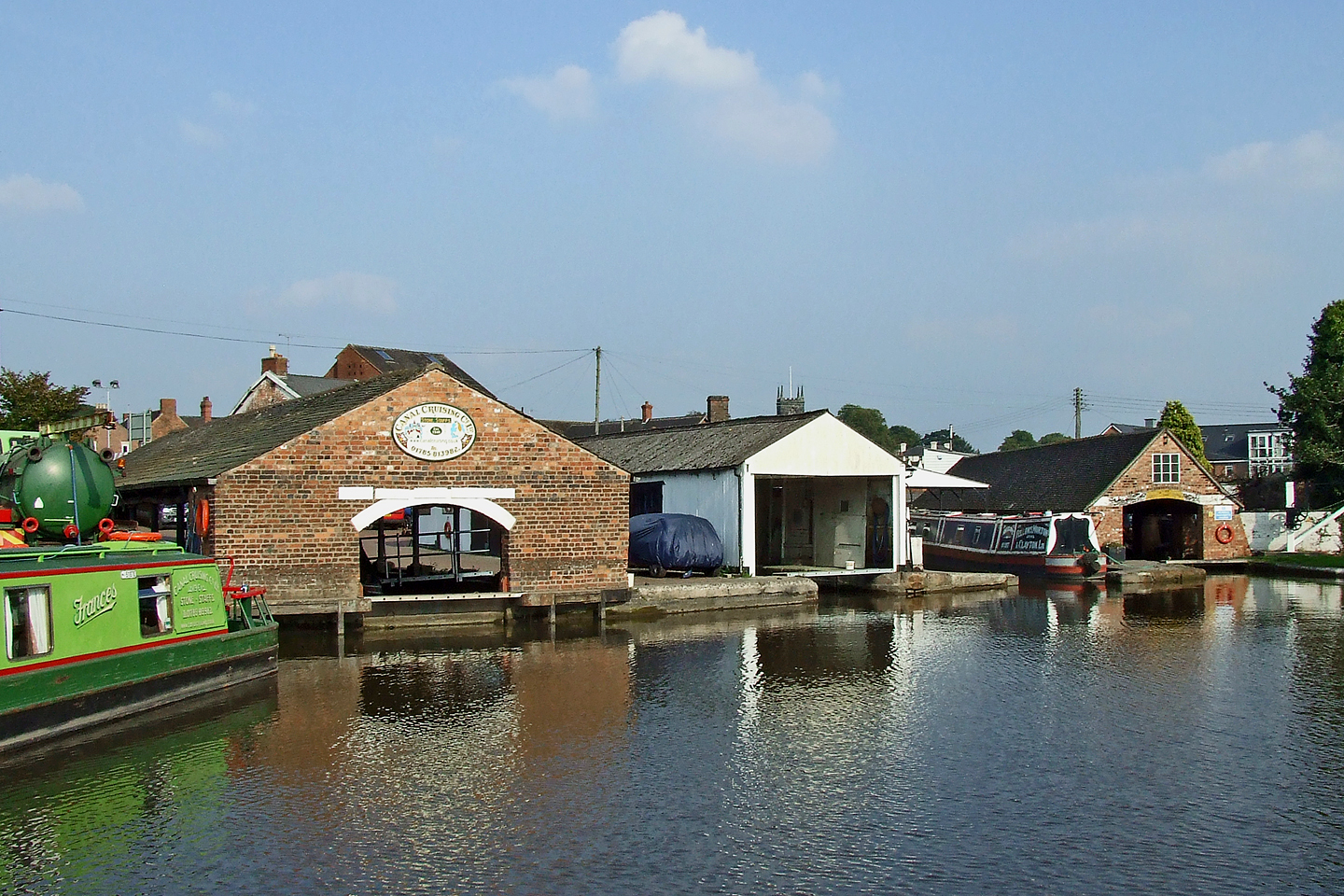
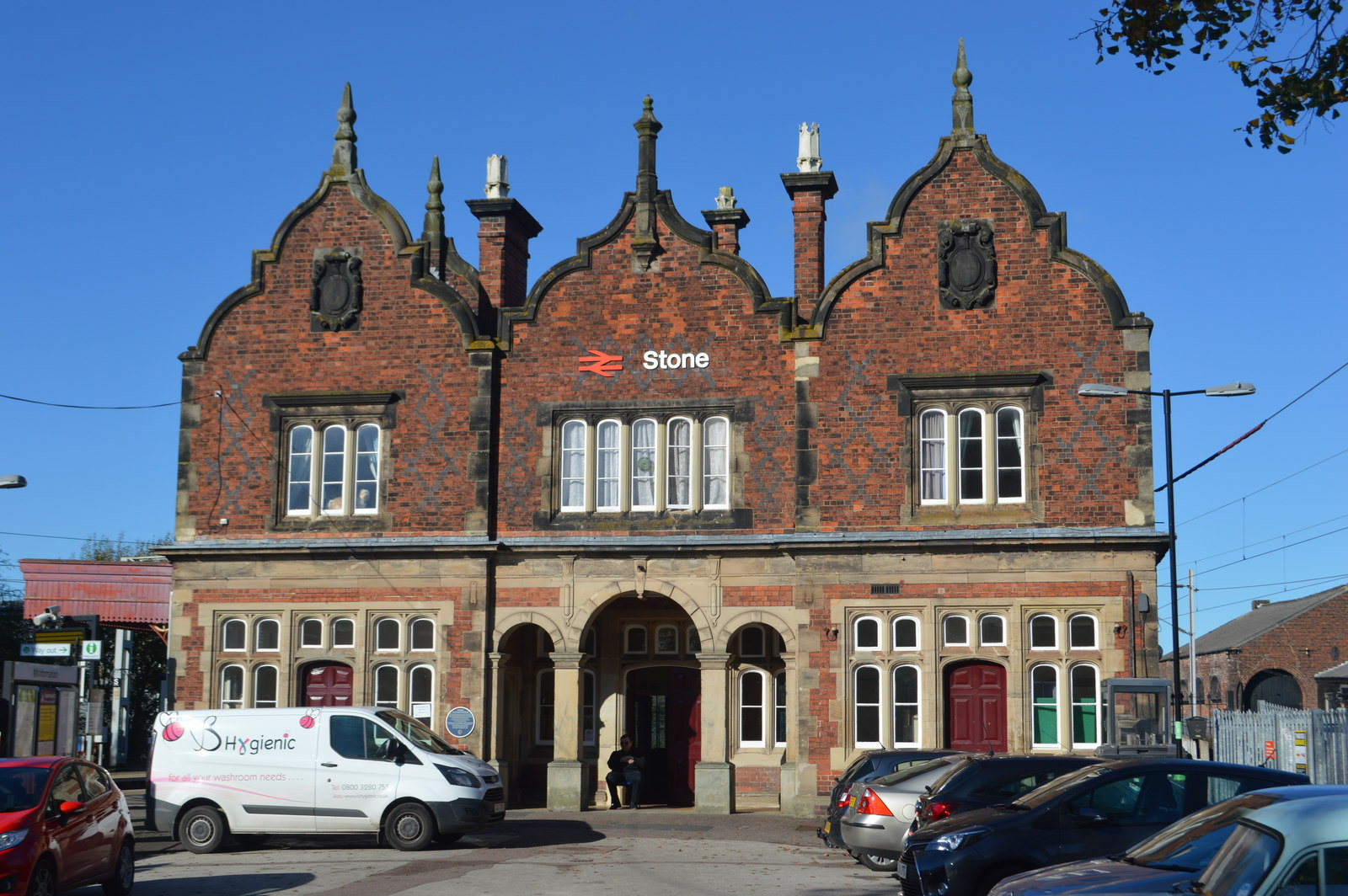
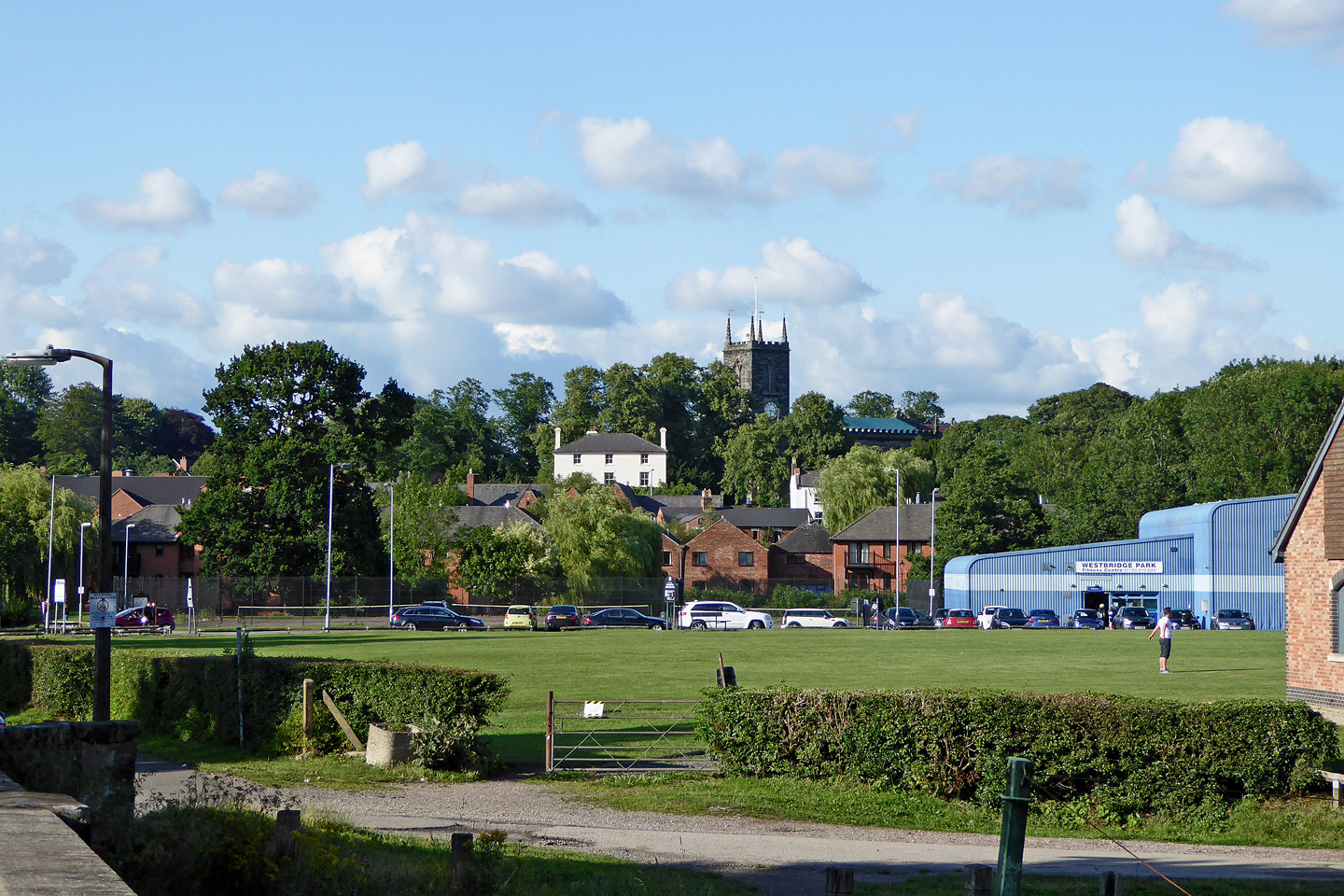
- Left to right, Top: The Trent and Mersey Canal at Crown Wharf; Upper: Crown Street and Stone Parish Church; Lower: High Street and Boatyard buildings; Bottom: Stone railway station and Stone skyline from Westbridge Park

- Location within Staffordshire
- Population: 17,278 (2021 census)
- OS grid reference: SJ903337
- District: Stafford
- Shire county: Staffordshire
- Region: West Midlands
- Country: England
- Sovereign state: United Kingdom
- Suburbs of the town: List: Aston-by-Stone (Part); Little Stoke; Oultoncross; Oulton Heath; Stonefield; Walton
- Post town: STONE
- Postcode district: ST15
- Dialling code: 01785
- Police: Staffordshire
- Fire: Staffordshire
- Ambulance: West Midlands
- UK Parliament: Stone, Great Wyrley and Penkridge

Stone is a market town and civil parish in the Borough of Stafford in Staffordshire, England. It is situated approximately 7 miles (11 km) north of Stafford, 7 miles (11 km) south of Stoke-on-Trent and 15 miles (24 km) north of Rugeley. As a notable canal town, Stone is recognised for its rich history, originating from the early Bronze Age and continuing through the Industrial Revolution, with the introduction of the Trent and Mersey Canal shaping the town's development and local industry.

Originally governed as an urban district council and a rural district council, Stone became part of the Borough of Stafford in 1974. Over the years, the town has seen a steady growth in its population, which was recorded as 12,305 in the 1991 census, 14,555 in 2001 and 16,385 in 2011.

== Etymology ==
The place-name's meaning is exactly what is stated, a "stone, rock", from the Old English stān (stone).

The local story is that the town was named after the pile of stones taken from the River Trent raised on the graves of the two princes, Ruffin and Wulfad, killed in AD 665 by their father, King Wulfhere of Mercia, because of their conversion to Christianity. However, this legend is unlikely to be true. Wulfhere was already a Christian when he became king, and the story on which it is probably based is set by Bede in another part of the country over ten years after Wulfhere's death.

More recent research points to older, though no less interesting nor tangible, possibilities regarding its name and founding. Around Stone lie several Romano-British sites and it is not inconceivable that the name alludes to the stone remains of a bridge or milestone, perhaps continuing the Roman road from Rocester to Blythe Bridge and then potentially through Stone. The settlement of Walton (which now forms a suburb) is ancient Brythonic (Celtic/ancient Briton place name). The most likely derivation for most places called Stone is from a prehistoric megalith, Roman milestone, a natural boulder or rock formation, or from 'a place where stone was obtained'. A Keuper sandstone outcrop on the north side of Stone, long quarried for building materials, may be the topographical feature from which the place was named. It may also be noted that a huge stone or erratic is recorded on Common Plot and in that respect it is unclear whether Stone Field here, one of the open-fields of Stone, is 'the field at Stone' or 'the field with the stone'.

== History ==
There is a Bronze Age ring ditch at Pirehill suggesting occupation in prehistoric times.

Stone lies within the territory of the Iron Age Celtic tribe 'the Cornovii' (people of the horn; perhaps a horned god or topographical feature), mentioned by Ptolemy in the 2nd century AD in his Geography. To the north-west of Stone lies one of their hill forts, which overlooks the Trent and perhaps the salt production in the region.

The early history of Stone is unclear and is clouded by the 12th century medieval romance concerning the murder of the Saxon princes Wulfad and Rufin by their father, Wulfhere of Mercia, who reputedly had his base near Darleston (Wulfherecester). The murder of Wulfad in the 7th century and his subsequent entombment under a cairn of stones is the traditional story (described as "historically valueless" by Thacker 1985: 6).

The church built over the stones marking the graves of Wulfad and Rufin in 670 lasted until the 9th century, before being destroyed by invading Danes. It was replaced in 1135 by the Augustinian Stone Priory, which survived until its dissolution in the reign of Henry VIII. The building collapsed in 1749 and the present church of St. Michael's was built in 1758. All that remains of the original priory is the rib-vaulted undercroft which forms the foundations beneath Priory House, which is located on Lichfield Street opposite the Frank Jordan Community Centre.

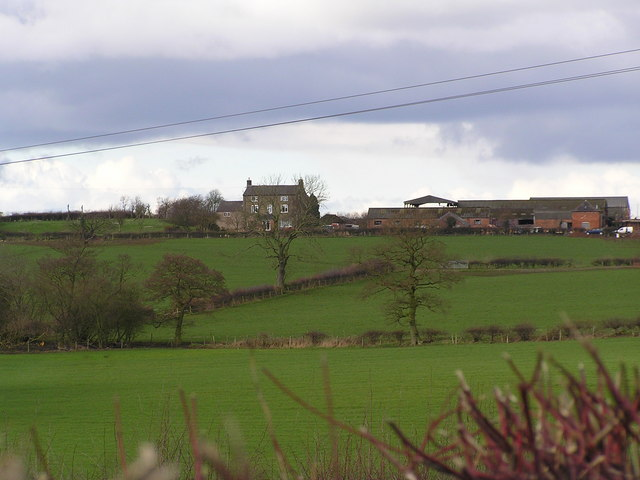
North Pirehill Farm

Stone lay within the Pirehill hundred of Staffordshire named after nearby Pire Hill. In 1251 Henry III granted Stone a market charter.

Stone Inclosure Act 1798
- Act of Parliament
- Parliament of Great Britain
- Long title: An act for dividing and enclosing certain common fields, in the parish of Stone, in the county of Stafford, called Stone Field and The Sandpits.
- Citation: 38 Geo. 3. c. 78 Pr.
- Territorial extent: Great Britain

Dates
- Royal assent: 21 June 1798
- Commencement: 21 June 1798 (Note: The Acts of Parliament (Commencement) Act 1793.)

Status: Current legislation

The Common Plot (also known as Mudley Pits) is a large area of open and wooded common land, sited just to the north of the town of Stone. It was reserved as an area of common land for the inhabitants of the town when the previous strip-farmed fields were enclosed by the Stone Inclosure Act 1798 (38 Geo. 3. c. 78 Pr.). The Duke of Cumberland built extensive winter fortifications and a camp here; traces of which can still be seen, during the winter of 1745/46. The purpose of the camp was to bring the Duke's army down from the freezing Staffordshire Moorlands and Peak District, where they had been seeking to stop an advance on London by a force of 6,000 Jacobite rebels. The rebels were thought to be using pack-horse routes over the high country, with the aim of reaching Derby. Stone was also strategic in preventing any break-away Jacobite group going across to Wales to recruit more men there but, with winter coming on, the Jacobites decided to retreat back to Scotland.

Stone Urban District was an urban district, based on the Stone civil parish which equates to the town of Stone. There were two amendments in parts of the Stone Rural parish in Stone Rural District were transferred in. The district was abolished by the Local Government Act 1972 and replaced with Stafford Borough Council and Stone Town Council. The latter publishes a history of Stone.

=== Roads ===
Stone stands in the valley of the River Trent, and was an important stopping-off point for stagecoaches on one of the roads turnpiked in the 18th century. A directory for 1851 says that "Stone was a very lively town and a great thoroughfare for coaches, carriers and travellers. No fewer than 38 stage coaches passed through the town daily." The main coaching route was the London to Holyhead route, via Watling Street as far as Lichfield and then the A51.

To support the coaching trade, Stone was a principal stopping point with many coaching inns to refresh both horses and travellers. Notable hostelries include the Crown Hotel, Crown & Anchor, Red Lion and the Black Horse Inn.

=== The Trent and Mersey Canal ===
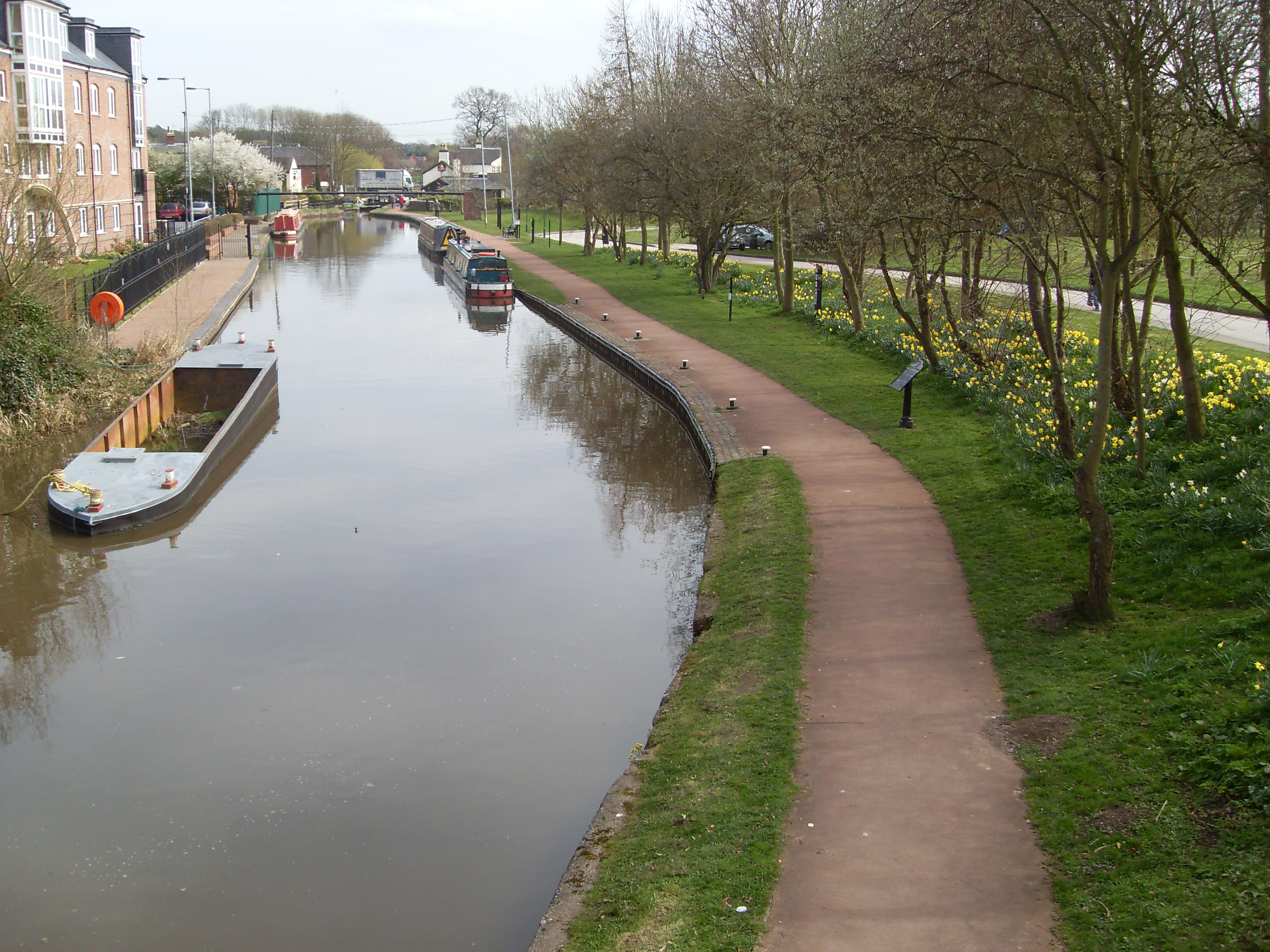
Trent and Mersey Canal

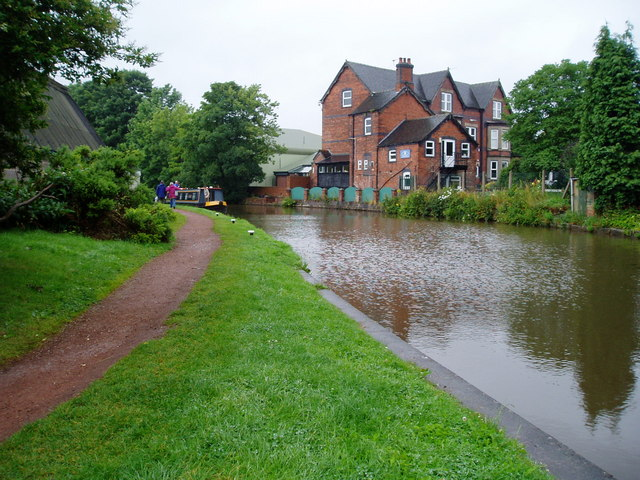
Trent and Mersey Canal

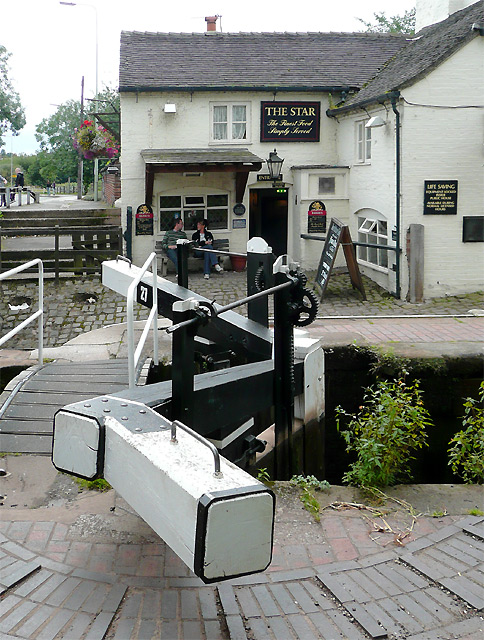
Lock gates and The Star

The River Trent, which runs through the town, had been used for cargo-carrying vessels since Roman times, but further inland smaller boats could only be used. Seasonal fluctuations in water depth proved insurmountable, although cargo could be carried from the sea as far south as Wilden Ferry (south-east of Derby), where the River Derwent joins the Trent and increases the quantity of water, then onwards by road. Prior to tarmac roads, journeys overland by roads were slow and delicate wares were prone to breakages over the rough terrain.

James Brindley, the canal builder, put forward the scheme to build what he called the Grand Trunk Canal to connect the two rivers, Mersey and Trent in 1766. It was backed by Josiah Wedgwood, who saw that it offered an efficient way to bring raw materials to the potteries and to transport finished wares to his customers.

By 29 September 1772, two days after Brindley's death, 48 miles of the Grand Trunk Canal (now known as the Trent and Mersey Canal) from Wilden Ferry to Stone was navigable; the length past Burton-on-Trent was completed in 1770.

On completion of the Star Lock, a grand opening was held and during this opening a cannon was fired in celebration; however, disaster struck and the cannon damaged the new lock, requiring a rebuild.

Stone became the headquarters of the canal company with its office at Westbridge House, sited then below Star Lock on what is now Westbridge Park. The offices were moved later to Stoke-on-Trent.

=== Brewing industry ===
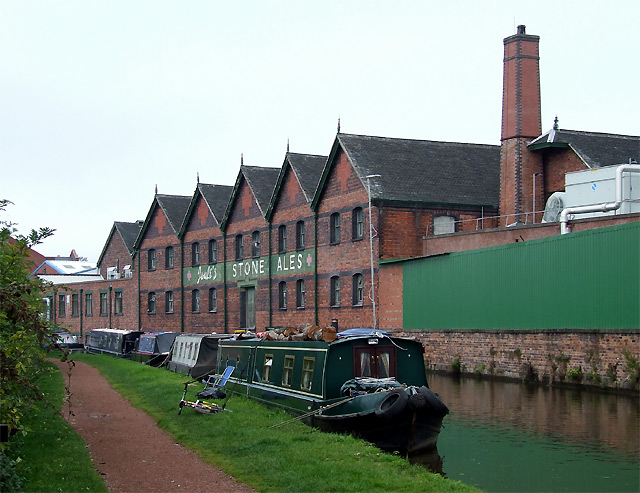
The warehouse of Joule's Brewery, on the Trent and Mersey Canal

Due to the quality of the local water beneath Stone, two brewers were located here carrying on the Augustinian monks' tradition of beer making. The most notable was John Joule & Sons Ltd, established in 1780. The company was acquired by Bass Charrington in 1968 and ceased brewing at the end of October 1974. The brewery was demolished in the autumn of 1977; the adjacent bottling plant was closed some years before. The canal played a great part in the export of beer. Joules once owned a pair of boats that delivered coal to the brewery and, as late as the 1950s, had the telephone number Stone 1. Joules' draught beer stores and bottling plant remains an imposing building on the canal and can be clearly identified by the red cross logo of John Joules in the brickwork.

The second brewer was Montgomery & Co, acquired by the Bent's Brewery Co of Liverpool in 1889; it was located on what is now Mount Industrial Estate. It was also taken over by Bass Brewery and closed on 31 March 1968. The brewing industry in Stone ceased after the closure of Joules and Bents, following an aggressive takeover from the nearby Burton upon Trent brewers in the 1960s and 1970s. In recent years, it has begun anew with the opening of the Lymestone Brewery in 2008. This family-run microbrewery is based in part of the original Bents brewery.

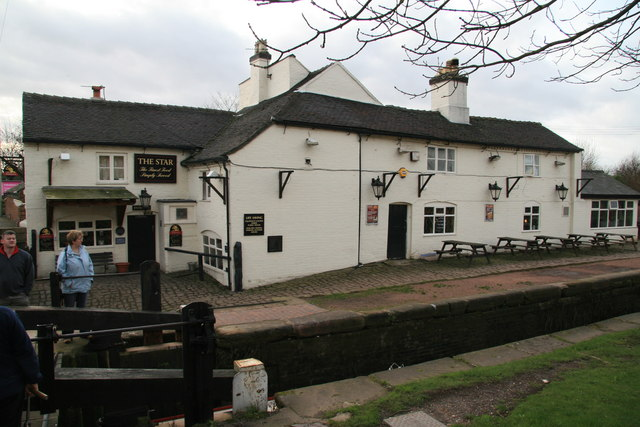
The Star Inn, Stone

More recently, a second microbrewery, trading under the name Joules (dropping the 'John' due to trademark reasons), has begun brewing in Market Drayton, Shropshire. These local beers are available in multiple pubs across the town and the wider region; Lymestone Brewery also has their own public house, The Borehole Inn, situated next to the brewery itself on the Mount Industrial Estate.

The Star public house was fully licensed in 1819, although the building predates the canal by some 200 years. The building has in its time been a butcher's shop and slaughterhouse. Stabling for boat horses was available up to the 1950s and the business relied heavily on the canal for trade.

=== Utilities ===
==== Gas ====
The Stone Gas Order 1881 authorised the Stone Gaslight and Coke Company to supply gas in Stone, Walton, and Little Stoke, as well as Darlaston, Meaford, Oulton and Aston.

There was a gasworks in Crown Street, between Stafford Street and the Joules brewery, backing onto the Trent and Mersey Canal.

The Stone Gas and Electricity Act 1914 (4 & 5 Geo. 5. c. xxv) extended the business of the company to include the supply of electricity, and extended the area of supply to be all of Stone Rural District, in addition to Stone Urban District. The company was renamed Stone Gas and Electricity Company.

=== Railway ===
The coming of the railway was to end Stone's era as a coaching and canal town. The North Staffordshire Railway opened its main line from Stoke-on-Trent through Stone to Norton Bridge on 3 April 1848; the following year a branch line from Stone to Colwich began operating.

One industry that did flourish under the railway era was the shoe industry; at its height in 1851, there were 16 shoeworks. The industry however declined after Australia, the main shoe market, imposed an import tax on the industry.

== Buildings ==
Stone has many buildings of interest including the Grade II listed Hayes House and the Catholic chapel of St Anne.

== Religion ==
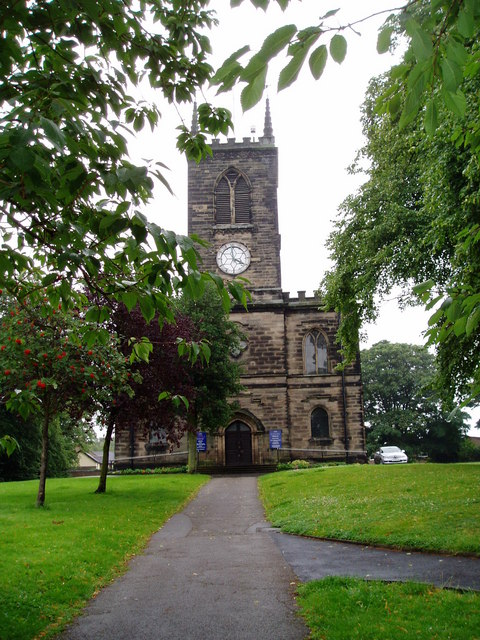
St Michael's Church

Stone Parish Church, dedicated to Saint Michael the Archangel, is at the south end of the town located on what used to be Stone Priory. It was commenced in 1753, and finished in 1758. The present clock dates from 1896.

Christ Church stands on the north side of the town and was erected in 1839.

== Education ==
State education within Stone is based on the three-tier school system, with a range of first and primary schools, two middle schools (Walton Priory Middle and Christchurch Academy) and a high school (Alleyne's Academy). Independent education is served by the Catholic St Dominic's Priory School founded with the convent of the same name in the 19th century by Mother Margaret Hallahan when the school was originally known as Blessed Imelda's Enpension School.

== Economy ==
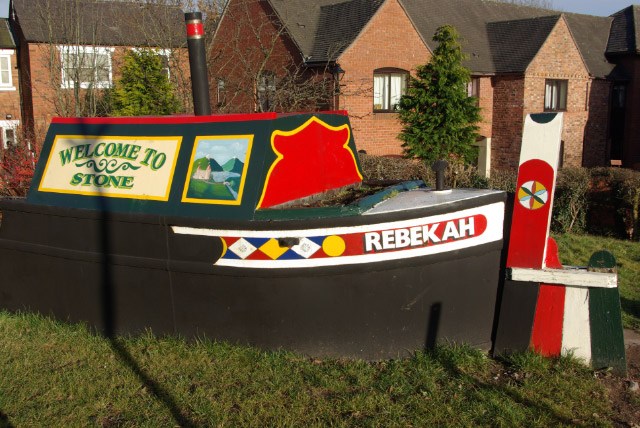
Rebekah, at Stone

Staffordshire Fire and Rescue Service has its headquarters just south of Stone. Yarnfield Park Training and Conference Centre just outside the town is a major training centre for the UK telecommunications industry. It is owned by BT Group and run by Accenture.

The canal still dominates the town. Many canal side sites have in recent times been taken over for modern day use including The Moorings, a development of apartments based on the old Stubbs warehouse. Apartments and housing surround the old Trent Hospital, once the workhouse. Housing developments also border the canal.

Commercial traffic has now been replaced by the leisure craft that pass through Stone each year. The Canal Cruising Company today operates from the historic site of the canal maintenance and boat building operations of the Trent and Mersey Canal Company. This restored docks complex with its workshops, by Yard Lock, continues to be used for the maintenance of pleasure craft and historic boats. In 2010, a new marina opened just south of the town, below Aston Lock, with moorings for pleasure craft, a farm shop and a café.

Stone is the key UK manufacturing site for the Quickfit laboratory glassware system which finds widespread use in many school, college and university science departments.

The National Association of Chimney Sweeps is located in the town.

The Stone Food and Drink Festival takes place the first weekend in October and brings together the very best in local produce and cooking talent. It attracts in excess of 20,000 visitors to the town and runs for one week, with the main event on the town's Westbridge Park on Friday, Saturday and Sunday.

== Transport ==
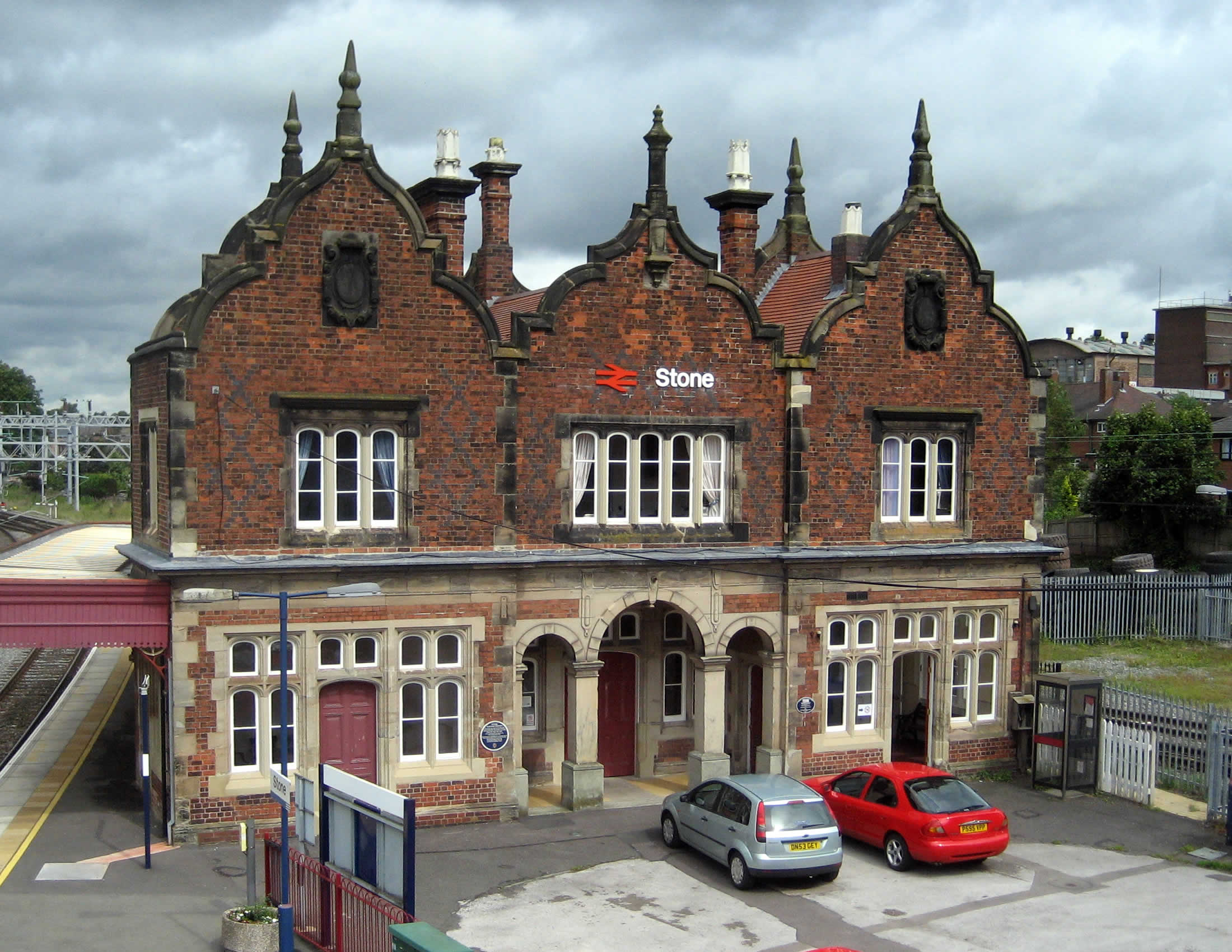
Stone railway station

Stone railway station is a stop on a spur of the West Coast Main Line between Colwich Junction and Manchester Piccadilly. London Northwestern Railway operates an hourly semi-fast service in each direction between Crewe and Stafford, via Stoke-on-Trent and Kidsgrove.

Stone's main bus routes are:

- 101: between Hanley, Stoke-on-Trent, Tittensor, Trentham, Newcastle-under-Lyme and Stafford. First Potteries operates the route on Mondays-Saturdays, with D&G Bus running it on Sundays.
- 100: between Hanley, Stoke-on-Trent and Stone; operated by D&G Bus.

Two trunk roads pass through the town: the A34 links Winchester, Birmingham, Manchester and Salford; and the A51 connects Lichfield with Chester. Stone is by-passed by the M6 motorway.

The Trent and Mersey Canal passes through the town. The canal towpath is accessible to walkers and cyclists northbound towards Barlaston, Trentham and Stoke-on-Trent; to the south, it connects the town with Burston, Weston and Great Haywood.

== Sport ==
The town is home to two football clubs: Stone Old Alleynians F.C. of the Midland League Premier Division and Stone Dominoes F.C.

Stone Old Alleynians F.C is the largest football club in the Midland’s region, with over 70 teams and 1,600 members, being based at Alleyne’s Sports Centre, Stone.

Staffordshire County Cricket Club play Minor Counties Championship matches at Lichfield Road, as do the town's cricket club, Stone Cricket Club.

== Media ==
=== Television ===
Television news is covered by BBC Midlands Today and ITV Central, both of which come from Birmingham. Stone can receive good to marginal signals from the Sutton Coldfield transmitting station and from The Wrekin transmitting station, which can be received in the higher parts of town.

=== Radio ===
Stone's local radio stations are Hits Radio Staffordshire & Cheshire and BBC Radio Stoke, which broadcast from studios in Stoke-on-Trent. However, some parts of the town can also receive Hits Radio Black Country & Shropshire, Greatest Hits Radio, BBC Radio WM, BBC Radio Cymru and Heart and Smooth from the West Midlands and North West.

=== Newspapers ===
Stone is covered by two daily newspapers: The Sentinel from Stoke-on-Trent and the Express and Star from Wolverhampton.

The weekly Staffordshire Newsletter and the bi-monthly Stone and Eccleshall Gazette also cover the town.

=== Magazines ===
- The Stone and Eccleshall Gazette

=== Community news ===
Stone has an independent community news website called A Little Bit Of Stone which delivers up-to-date news and information for the residents and visitors of the town.

== Notable people ==
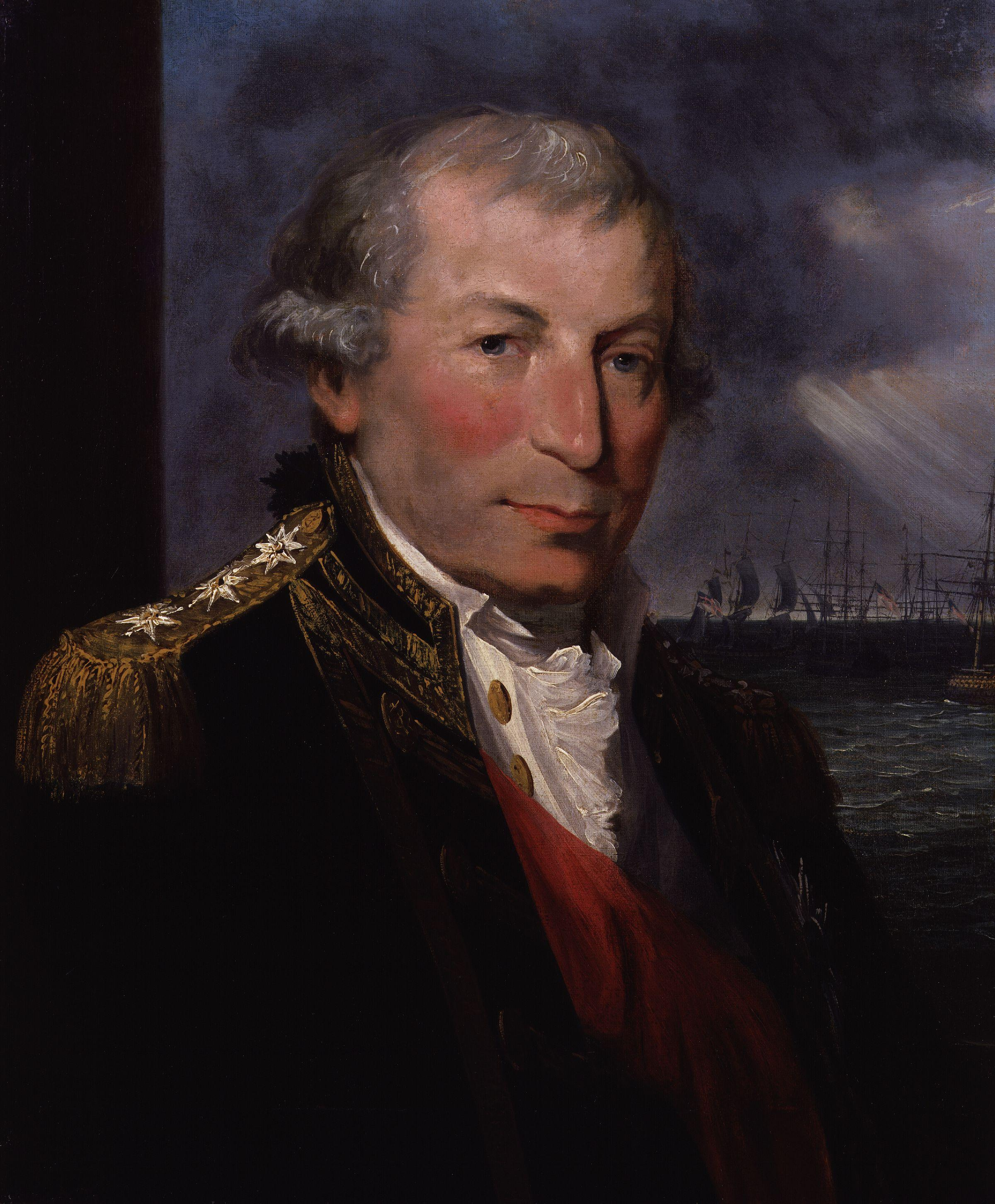
John Jervis, Earl of St Vincent, ca.1795

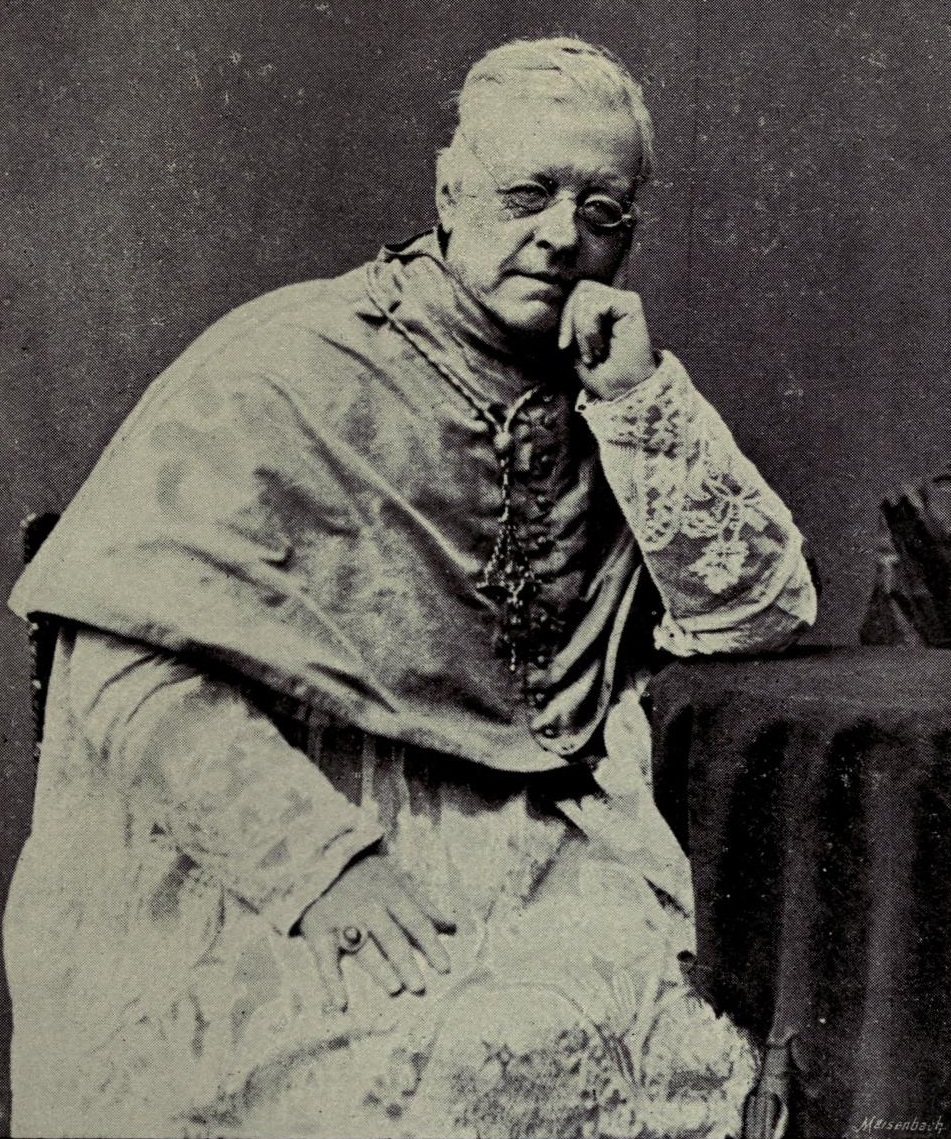
William Bernard Ullathorne, pre 1889

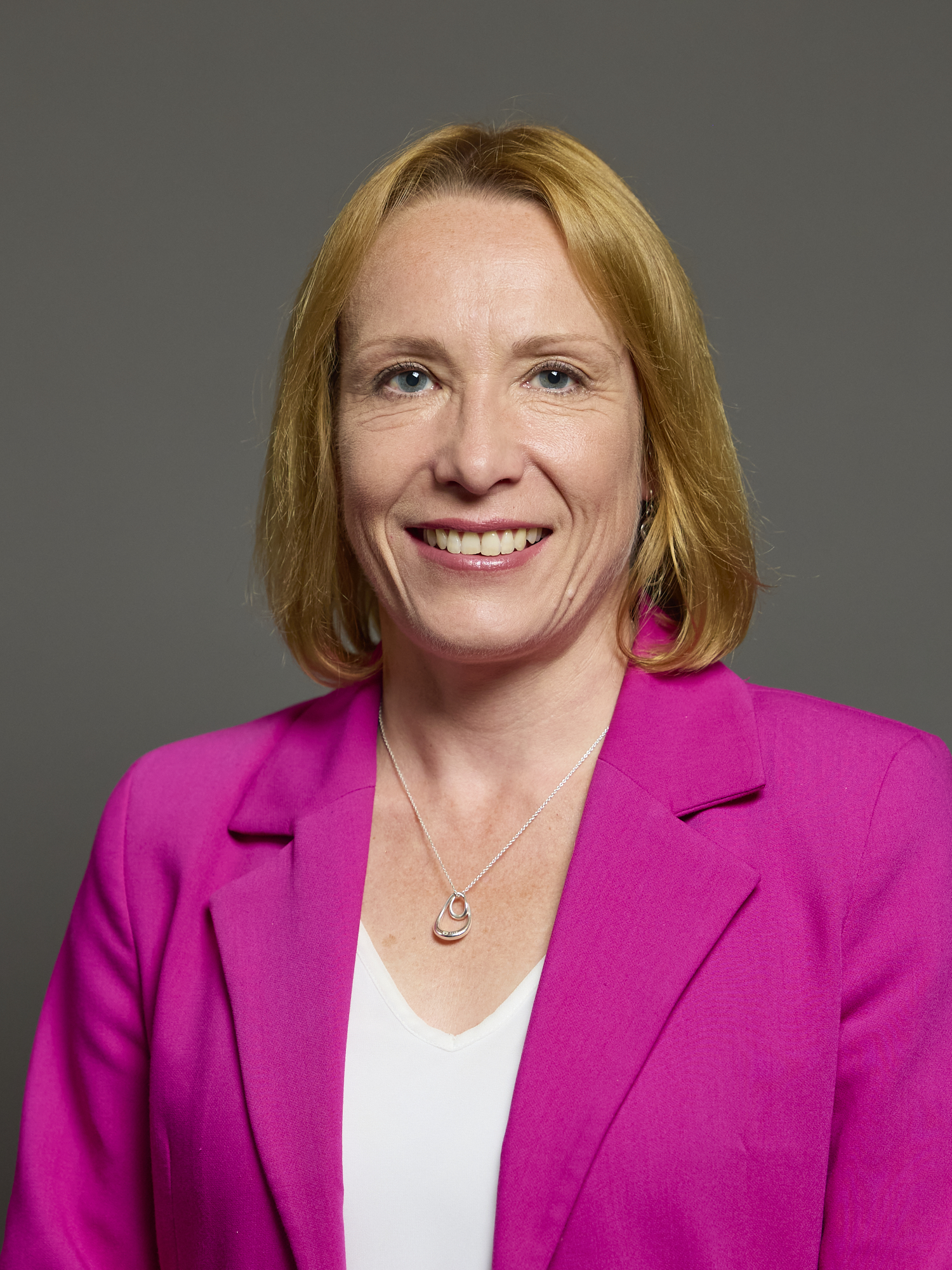
Helen Morgan, MP 2024

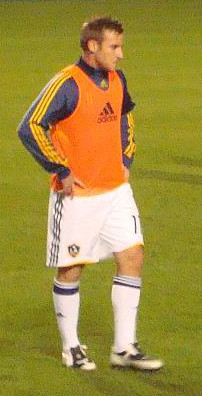
Chris Birchall, 2010

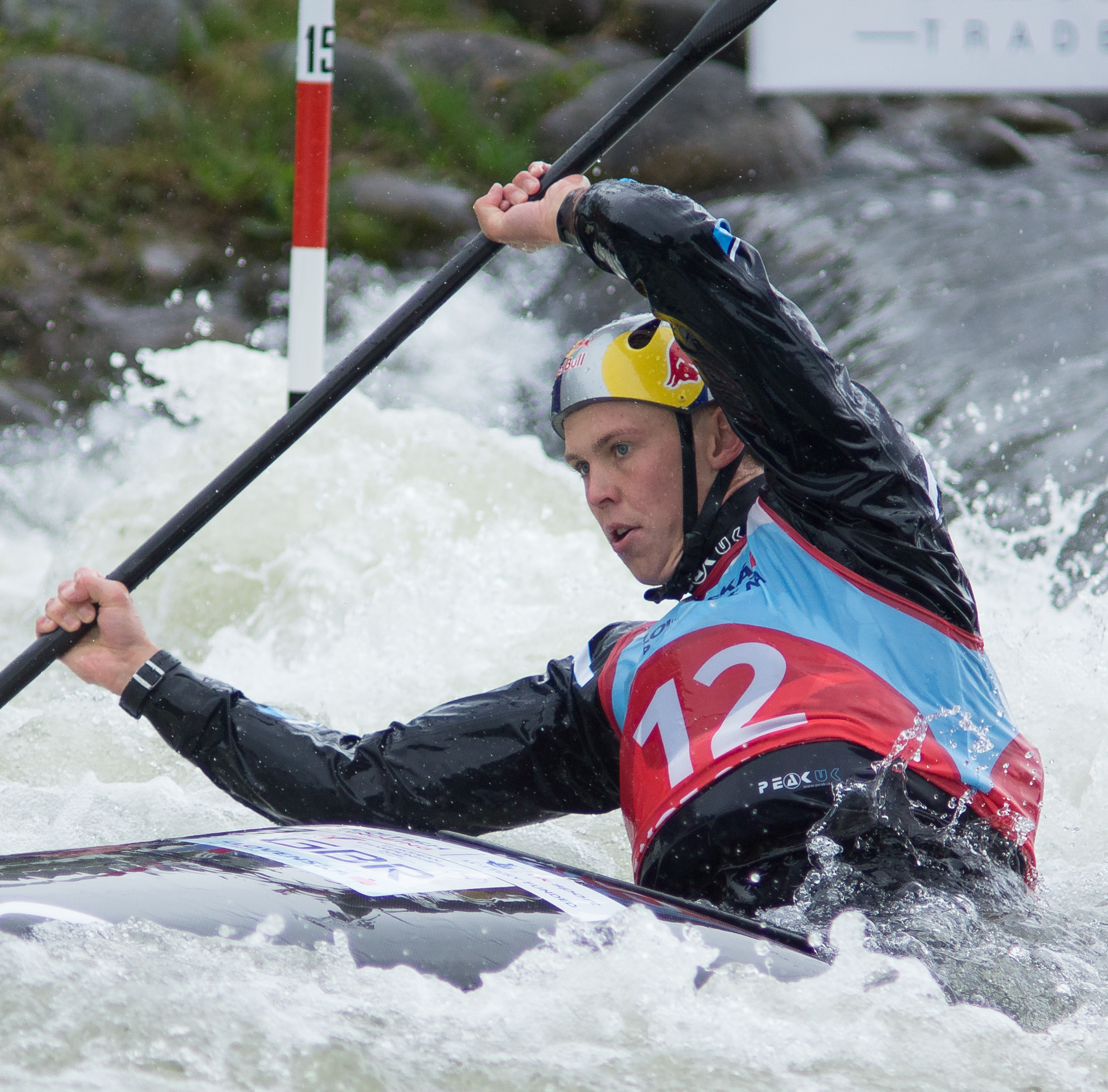
Joe Clarke, 2016

- Werburgh (ca.650–700), an Anglo-Saxon princess, was born in Stone and died in Trentham
- James Brindley, (1716 – 1772) the Surveyor-General of the Trent & Mersey Canal
- John Jervis, 1st Earl of St Vincent, (1735 in Meaford Hall – 1823) colleague of Lord Nelson, victor in a battle Cape St Vincent in 1797. He was buried in the family mausoleum in Stone. The south end of Stone High is named: - Earl St Vincent Square. There is also monument in the crypt of St Paul's Cathedral.
- Thomas Oldfield (1756–1799), an English major in the Royal Marines.
- Stebbing Shaw, (1762 near Stone –1802) a cleric, local historian and topographer
- Peter De Wint, (1784 in Stone – 1849) landscape painter
- William Bernard Ullathorne, (1806 – 1889) Roman Catholic Bishop of Birmingham is buried locally
- William Austin (1807–1892), Bishop of Guyana in South America for 50 years.
- Augusta Theodosia Drane (1823–1894) writer, Roman Catholic nun and prioress of Stone convent.
- Thomas Smith (1847 in Stone – 1919) trade union leader and Liberal politician, general secretary of National Union of Boot and Shoe Rivetters and Finishers
- Frank Clewlow, (1885 in Stone – 1957) actor-director, worked in England, Scotland, Australia & New Zealand
- Eva Morris, (1885 – 2000) the oldest person in the world from December 1999 to her death in November 2000 at a local nursing home, aged 114
- Sarah Ward (1895–1965), politician, MP for Cannock and member of Staffs CC for almost 20 years
- L. T. C. Rolt, (1910 – 1974) author of ‘Narrowboat’ and several engineering biographies
- Frank Thomas (1930 in Stone – 1988) Roman Catholic Bishop of Northampton
- David Warrilow, (1934 in Stone – 1995) actor, interpreted the works of Samuel Beckett
- Cedric Price, (1934 in Stone – 2003) an architect, teacher and writer on architecture
- Terry Darlington (born c.1940? - 2025) author of Narrow Dog to Carcassonne & Narrow Dog to Wigan Pier
- A. N. Wilson (born 1950 in Stone) writer and newspaper columnist
- Ian Morris (born 1960) historian and author of Why the West Rules—For Now, went to school in Stone
- Kirsty Bertarelli (born 1971), songwriter and beauty pageant; Miss United Kingdom 1988
- Scout Niblett (born 1973 in Stone) an indie rock musician, real name Emma Louise Niblett
- Helen Morgan (born 1975), Liberal Democrat politician, MP for North Shropshire since 2021; brought up and went to Alleyne's Academy in Stone
- Jackie Degg, (born 1978 in Stone) former glamour model and actress.

=== Sport ===
- Tom Fishwick (1876 in Stone – 1950) cricketer, played first-class cricket for Warwickshire
- Arthur Fernie (1877 in Stone – 1959) cricketer, played first-class cricket for Cambridge University and the Marylebone Cricket Club
- Billy Tompkinson (1895 in Stone – 1968) footballer, played 302 games mainly for Rochdale & Stockport County
- Bertie Shardlow (1909 in Stone – 1976) cricketer, boat carpenter and father of Paul Shardlow
- Jack Moore (1911-ca.2008). amateur footballer, referee and tennis player.
- Russell Flower (born 1942 in Stone) left-handed batsman, bowled slow left-arm orthodox
- Paul Shardlow (1943 in Stone – 1968) football goalkeeper and cricket player
- John James (born 1948 in Stone - 2021) footballer, played 381 games, mainly for Port Vale
- Chris Banks (born 1965), footballer, played 766 games, mainly for Bath City & Cheltenham Town
- Stan Collymore, (born 1971 in Stone) former footballer, played 287 games and 3 for England & TV pundit
- Keri Lees (born 1972 in Stone) retired athlete, competed in the hurdles at the 2000 Summer Olympics
- Chris Birchall, (born 1984) footballer, played 286 games and 44 for Trinidad and Tobago; school in Stone
- Andy Wilkinson, (born 1984 in Stone) footballer defender, played 205 games, mainly for Stoke City
- Lizzie Neave (born 1987) Olympic canoeist, lived in Stone and trained at the Stafford and Stone Canoe Club.
- Joe Clarke (born 1992) Olympic gold medalist at the 2016 Summer Olympics in Rio, attended Alleyne's Academy in Stone
- James Bolton (born 1994), footballer, has played over 300 games

== Twin towns ==
Stone is twinned with Bagnacavallo, Italy.

== See also ==
- Listed buildings in Stone, Staffordshire
- Listed buildings in Stone Rural
- Stone Meadows
