= Margaret Hallahan =

English Catholic religious sister

Servant of God Margaret Hallahan OP
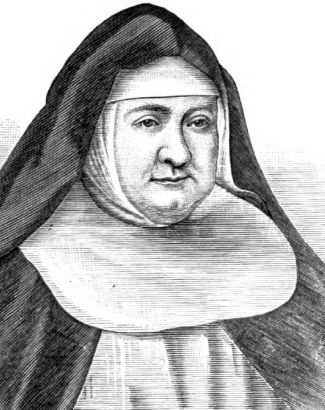
- Born: 23 January 1802; London, England
- Died: 11 May 1868 (aged 66); Stone, Staffordshire, England

Margaret Hallahan (23 January 1803 – 10 May 1868) was an English Catholic religious sister, foundress of the Dominican Congregation of St. Catherine of Siena (third order).

== Biography ==
Born in London, Hallahan was the only child of poor Irish Catholics. Due to the illness of her parents, when she was six years old she was sent to an orphanage, St Aloysius's Charity School in Somers Town, for three years and then at the age of nine went out to service, in which state of life she remained for nearly thirty years. In 1826 she accompanied the family with which she was living to Bruges; there she tried her vocation as a lay sister in the convent of the English Augustinian nuns, but only remained there a week.

She became a Dominican tertiary in 1842, and then came to England, proceeding to Coventry where she worked under William Bernard Ullathorne, afterwards Roman Catholic Bishop of Birmingham, among the factory girls. Presently she was joined by others, and with the consent of the Dominican fathers formed a community of Dominican tertiaries, who were to devote themselves to active works of charity. The first vows were made on the feast of the Immaculate Conception, 1845. From Coventry the community moved to Bristol, where several schools were placed under their charge, from there they went to Longton, the last of the pottery towns in Staffordshire.

In 1851 the congregation received papal approbation, and in 1852 the foundation stone of St. Dominic's convent was laid at Stone, Staffordshire, outside the Black Country: this became the motherhouse and novitiate, and to it the Longton community afterwards moved. At Stone a church and a hospital for incurables were built; this latter was one of Hallahan's schemes, and was begun on a small scale at Bristol. In 1857 she opened another convent at Stoke-on-Trent, a few miles from Stone, and the same year founded an orphanage at the latter place.

In 1858 Hallahan went to Rome, to obtain the final confirmation of her constitutions, which was granted, and the congregation was placed under the jurisdiction of the Master General of the Dominicans, who appoints a delegate, generally the bishop of the diocese, to set for him. New foundations were made at Our Lady and St Catherine of Sienna next to Grove Hall in Bow, London, where Hallahan donated a relic of the saint, and at St Marychurch, Torquay, before her death.

== Sources ==
- Life of Mother Margaret Hallahan by her religious children (London, 1869);
- Die Orden und Congregationem der katholischen Kirche II (Paderborn, 1901);
- Steele, Convents of Great Britain (London, 1902).
