= Dowanhill =

Area of Glasgow, Scotland

Coordinates: 55.877299°N 4.301732°W

- Location within Glasgow
- OS grid reference: NS561673
- Council area: Glasgow City Council
- Lieutenancy area: Glasgow
- Country: Scotland
- Sovereign state: United Kingdom
- Post town: GLASGOW
- Postcode district: G12
- Dialling code: 0141
- Police: Scotland
- Fire: Scottish
- Ambulance: Scottish
- UK Parliament: Glasgow North
- Scottish Parliament: Glasgow Kelvin

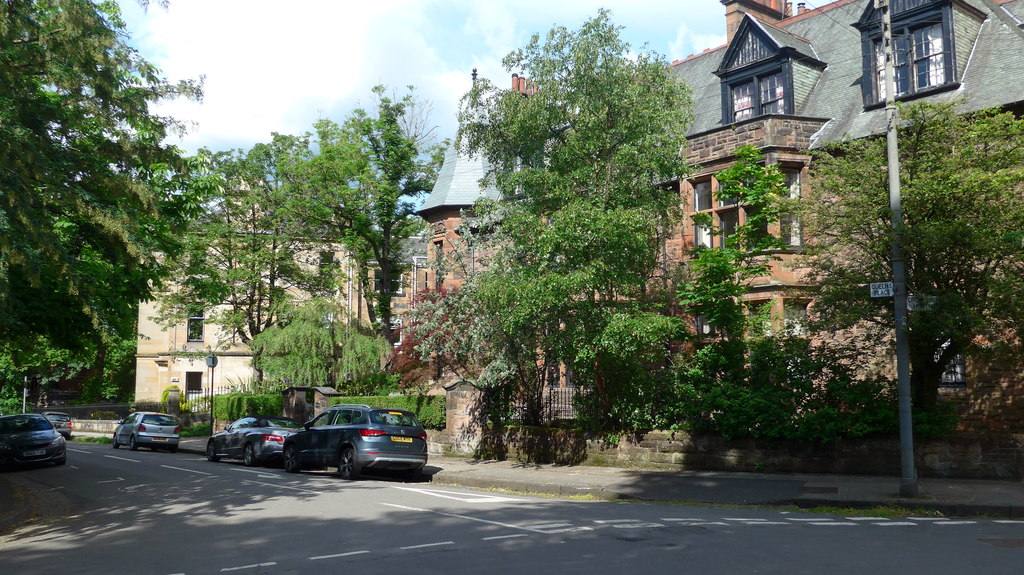
Queen's Place, a street typical of the area

Dowanhill is an area in the West End of Glasgow, Scotland.

An affluent middle-upper class residential district, the area generally contains a mixture of terraced townhouses with private communal gardens, detached villas with private grounds and a number of four-storey tenement buildings. Originally constructed from the middle of the 19th century onwards.

The area, although mostly residential also include a Waitrose on Byres Road, and Notre Dame High School on Observatory road, founded as an Independent School, it became the last remaining girls' state school in Scotland until its co-ed reform in 2019. The area also borders the Glasgow Botanic Gardens.

In common with many areas of the West End, continual development causes concern for many residents who fear the area becoming overdeveloped; this concern was highlighted in the bitter dispute over the proposed redevelopment of Dowanhill Tennis Club.

In 2005–2006 due to increased traffic levels and to discourage rat running Glasgow City Council introduced traffic calming measures and converted a number of streets into one-way traffic systems.

In 1869 Jefferson Davis, the only president of the Confederate States of America, stayed in Dowanhill while visiting the Glasgow merchant James Smith.

The earliest known registered scout troop in the world, the 1st Glasgow Scout Troop, is still active in Dowanhill. Captain 'Boss' Young established the troop in 1907 and the group was registered with Scout HQ, London on 16 January 1908.

35 Saltoun Street, the building depicted in the 1993 painting Windows in the West, is located in Dowanhill.
