= Notre Dame Roman Catholic Girls' School =

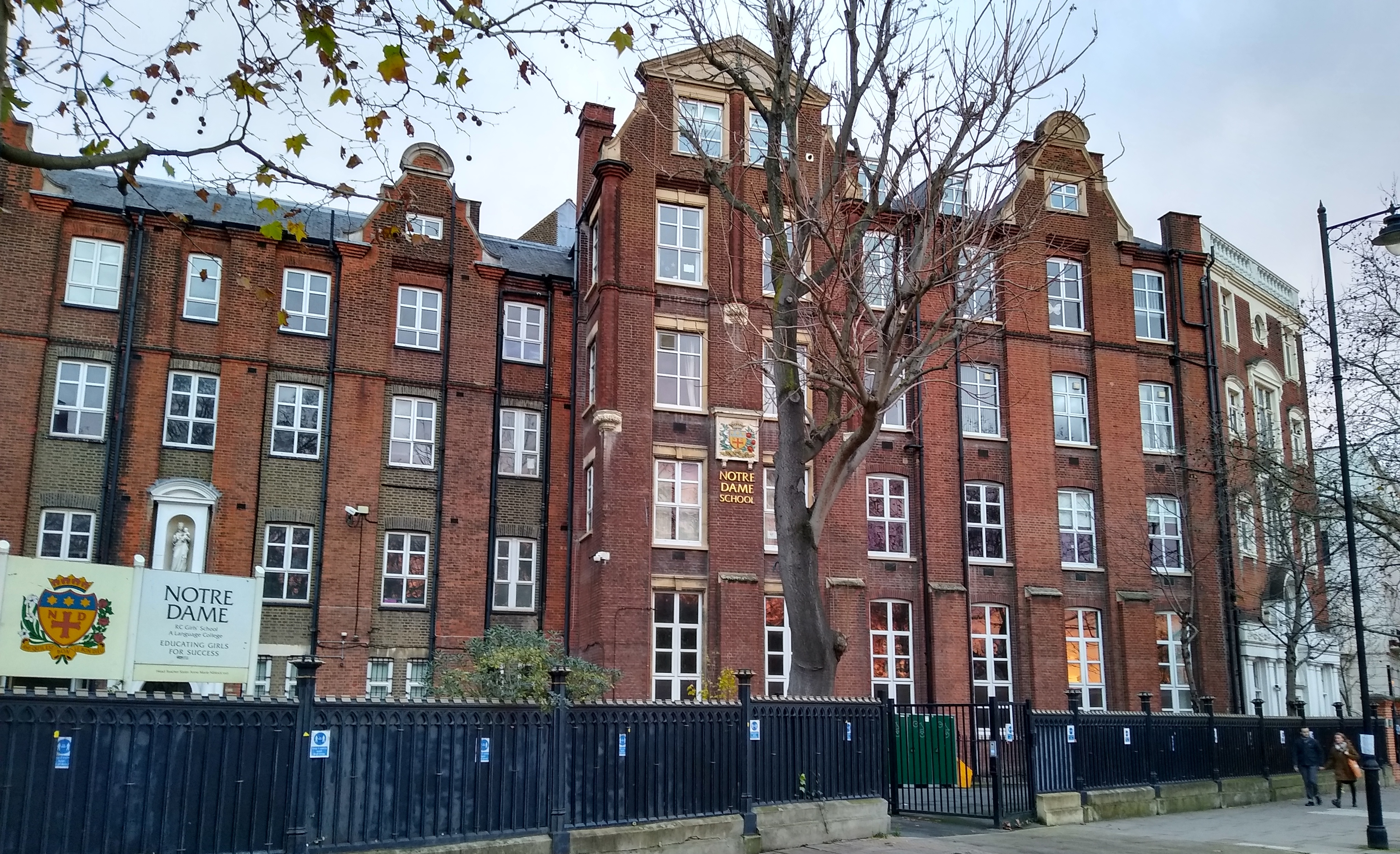

Location
- 118 St George's Road; Southwark, London, SE1 6EX; United Kingdom; 51.4969°N 0.1062°W

Information
- Type: Academy
- Religious affiliation: Roman Catholic
- Established: 1855
- Founders: Sisters of Notre Dame de Namur
- Local authority: Southwark
- Trust: South East London Catholic Academy Trust (SELCAT)
- Department for Education URN: 149369 Tables
- Ofsted: Reports
- Chair of Governors: Colin Garvey
- Headteacher: Ms. B Byrne
- Gender: Girls
- Age: 11 to 16
- Enrolment: 615
- Website: https://www.notredame.southwark.sch.uk/

Notre Dame Roman Catholic Girls' School is an all-girls' Roman Catholic secondary school (having been a grammar school post-World War II until 1977) in Elephant and Castle, in south London. Girls attend the school from ages 11–16 (11-18 until 1985). The current headteacher is Ms. B Byrne.

== School history ==
The school was founded by the Sisters of Notre Dame de Namur in 1855 and celebrated its 150th anniversary in 2005.

Previous Headteachers include Sister Myra Poole, SND and Sister Rosemary O'Callaghan who became the school chaplain.

The school converted to academy status in December 2022, having previously been a voluntary aided school administered by Southwark Council. The school is sponsored by the Roman Catholic Archdiocese of Southwark and the South East London Catholic Academy Trust, but coordinates with the local authority for admissions.

== Linked schools ==
The Sisters of Notre Dame de Namur base their spirituality on the teachings of their Mother Foundress, Saint Julie Billiart. The Sisters of Notre Dame de Namur founded other schools in the United Kingdom:

- Notre Dame High School, Glasgow
- Notre Dame Catholic Sixth Form College, Leeds
- Notre Dame High School, Norwich
- Notre Dame Catholic School, Plymouth
- Notre Dame High School, Sheffield
- Notre Dame Catholic College, Liverpool
- several schools which became part of St Julie's Catholic High School, Liverpool

They also previously had schools in Battersea, London; Wigan, Lancashire; and a boarding school in Birkdale, Lancashire (some of the other schools having initially been boarding and day schools).

== School performance ==
As of 2020, the school was last inspected by Ofsted in 2012, when it received a judgement of Outstanding.

In 2019 the school was identified as the most undersubscribed school of those judged Outstanding; it had the lowest ratio of applications per place.

== Alumni ==
- Inez Pearn (1913–1976) – novelist
- Mary Ney (b. 1949) – senior public servant
- Catherine Tate (b. 1969) – actress, comedian and writer
