= Saint Julie (disambiguation) =

Saint Julie may refer to:

- Saint Julie, Catholic saint
- Sainte-Julie, Quebec
- Sainte-Julie, Ain, a commune of the Ain département, in France
- Saint Julie Billiart Parish, Roman Catholic parish in California

== See also ==
- Saint Julia (disambiguation)
