= Sisters of Notre Dame =

Sisters of Notre Dame may refer to:

- Congregation of Notre Dame de Montreal
- School Sisters of Notre Dame
- Sisters of Notre Dame de Namur
- Sisters of Notre Dame of Coesfeld
