= Notre Dame Catholic College, Liverpool =

Notre Dame Catholic Academy

Location
- 180 Great Homer Street; Liverpool, Merseyside, L5 5AF; England; 53.430883°N 2.972382°W

Information
- Type: Voluntary aided comprehensive
- Motto: Ah Quil Est Bon Le Bon Dieu (How good is the good God)
- Religious affiliation: Roman Catholic
- Established: 1869
- Founders: Sisters of Notre Dame de Namur
- Local authority: Liverpool City Council
- Department for Education URN: 104706 Tables
- Ofsted: Reports
- Headteacher: Victoria Taylor
- Gender: Mixed
- Age: 11 to 18
- Enrolment: 979
- Diocese: Liverpool
- Former name: Notre Dame Collegiate School
- Former name: Notre Dame Catholic College
- Website: https://notredameliverpool.com/

Notre Dame Catholic Academy is a Catholic secondary school and sixth form in Everton, Liverpool, England. Founded by the Sisters of Notre Dame de Namur, it was a girls' school for most of its history but became coeducational from September 2012. From June 2024, the school joined St Joseph’s Catholic Multi Academy Trust, becoming Notre Dame Catholic Academy.

== Admissions ==
The College became coeducational from September 2012, admitting boys into Year 7 for the first time. Boys were already undertaking Sixth Form education at Notre Dame Catholic College.

== History ==
It was founded in February 1869. The Notre Dame Catholic College was originally the residence of the Sisters of Notre Dame in Liverpool, and began as a pupil-teacher centre with links to local primary schools. The collegiate school did not actually come into existence until 1902, with this merging with the pupil teacher centre in 1908.

=== Direct grant grammar school ===
It was known as Notre Dame Collegiate School at Everton Valley, and became a direct grant grammar school in 1946 as a result of the Education Act 1944.

=== Comprehensive ===
The sisters did not move out of the building until 1978 due to the expansion and the intake of the school building, and the school building also followed this expansion to pave the way for the institution to become an all-girls comprehensive school in 1983, which also tallied with the amalgamation of both St John's Secondary Modern School and St Catherine's Secondary Modern School to form Notre Dame High School in the same year.

In 2001, the school added the word 'Catholic' to its title to become Notre Dame Catholic High School, but in 2002 it became a specialist Performing Arts College.

The former all-girls' college started to accept boys into Year 7 from September 2012. Boys were already enrolled in the sixth form.

In September 2013, the college moved to a new building next to Everton Park sports centre on Great Homer Street as part of the wider Project Jennifer scheme. Construction had begun on the new building in July 2012.

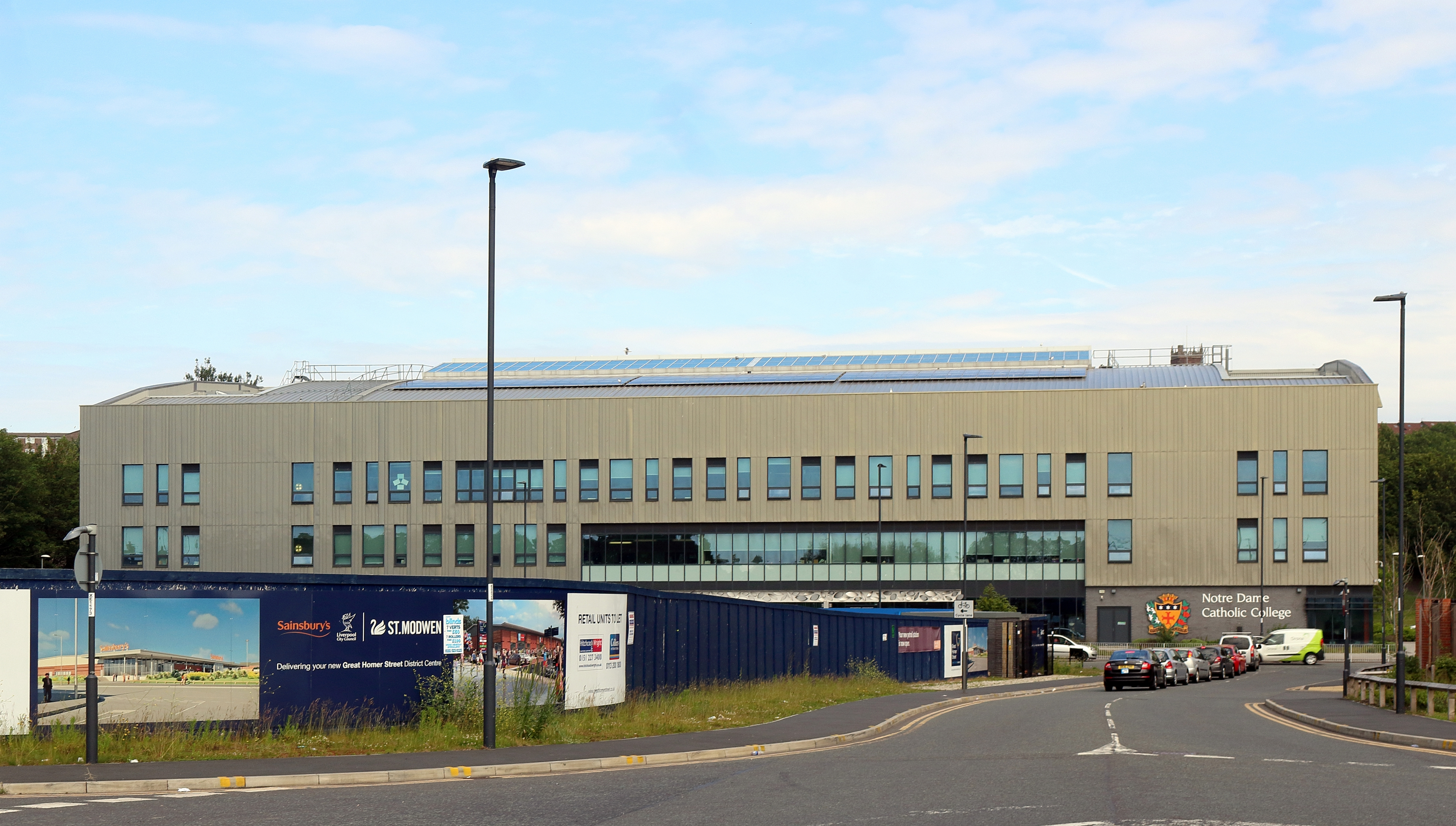
School buildings

== Notable former pupils ==
=== Notre Dame Collegiate School ===
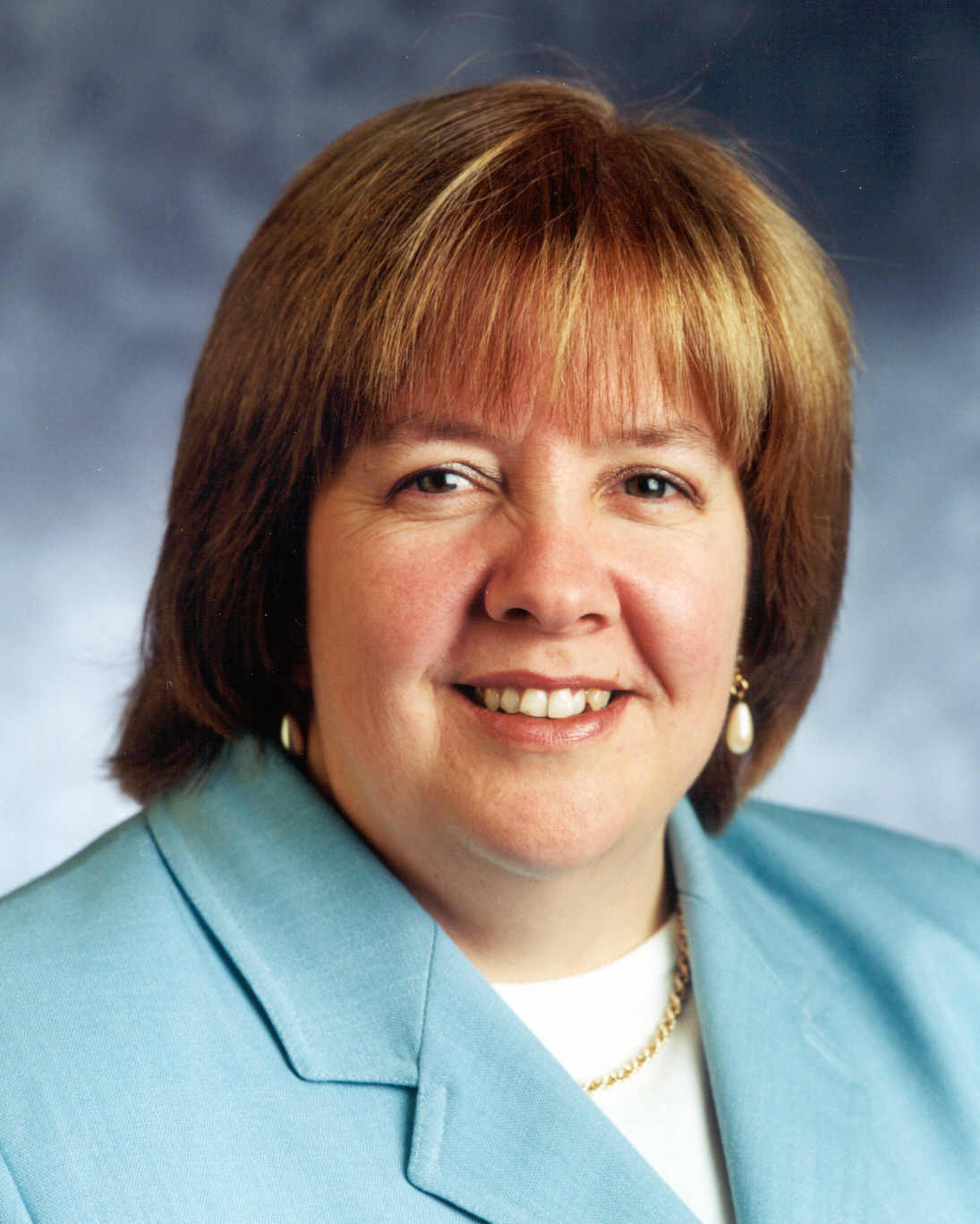
Mary Mulligan MSP in October 2012

- Lyn Andrews, author
- Dame Colette Bowe, Chairman from March 2009 – April 2014 of Ofcom
- Prof Yvonne Carter CBE, Dean from 2004 to 2009 of Warwick Medical School
- Jackie Downey, actress who starred in The Brothers McGregor
- Kate Fitzgerald, actress who played Doreen Corkhill, wife of Billy Corkhill, from 1985 to 1989 in Brookside
- Kate McCann, general practitioner and mother of Madeleine McCann
- Joan MacNaughton CB, President from 2011 to 2013 of the Energy Institute, who married Sir Bill Jeffrey (Permanent Secretary at the MoD) in 1979
- Mary Mulligan, Labour MSP from 1999 to 2011 for Linlithgow
- Margaret Murphy, author (nee Wright)
- Dr Mary Parke, phycologist at the Marine Biological Association
- Winifred Robinson, presenter since 2000 of You and Yours on BBC Radio 4
- Margaret Wall, Baroness Wall of New Barnet (nee Mylott), Chair of the Labour Party from 2001 to 2002
- Joan Walmsley, Baroness Walmsley, wife of Martin Thomas, Baron Thomas of Gresford (both Lib-Dem peers)

== See also ==
- Notre Dame High School, Glasgow
- Notre Dame High School, Sheffield
- Notre Dame Roman Catholic Girls' School
