= Julia McGroarty =

Irish-born American Roman Catholic religious leader and educator (1827–1901)

Sister Julia McGroarty

Personal life
- Born: Susan McGroarty; 13 February 1827 Inver, County Donegal, Ireland
- Died: 12 November 1901 (aged 74) Peabody, Massachusetts, United States

Religious life
- Religion: Christian
- Order: Sisters of Notre Dame de Namur

Sister Superior Julia McGroarty (13 February 1827 – 12 November 1901) was an Irish-American Sisters of Notre Dame de Namur nun and educator. She was the first American superior of the order, and oversaw the expansion of the order's educational work in the United States, founding Trinity Washington University.

== Early life ==
Julia McGroarty was born Susan McGroarty in Inver, County Donegal on 13 February 1827. She was the second daughter of the ten children of a farmer, Neil McGroarty and Catherine (née Bonner). The McGroarty family emigrated to the United States in the spring of 1831, settling in Cincinnati, Ohio, where her maternal grandmother, aunt and two uncles were living. For a time, her father farmed in Fayetteville, Brown County, but when he took up work as a railroad and turnpike contractor, the family moved to Cincinnati. McGroarty's father died of pneumonia in 1838. Their uncle, the physician Stephen Bonner, helped to support the family. McGroarty was educated in local schools, where she was an average student. She used her excellent memory to get through her lessons, and was ten by the time she learnt to read. She enrolled in the newly opened school run by the Belgian order of nuns, the Sisters of Notre Dame de Namur, at age 13 and became an accomplished student. On 1 January 1846, she entered the convent as the first American postulant. She was professed on 25 April 1846, taking the name Julia in honour of Julie Billiart, the order's founder.

== Career ==
McGroarty taught in the infant school during her two-year novitiate, taking her vows on 3 August 1848, after which she was placed in charge of the Cincinnati day school. She was appointed mistress of boarders at the order's new Notre Dame school in Roxbury, Massachusetts in 1854. When she was made superior of the new Philadelphia Academy in 1860, McGroarty became the order's first American superior. She went on to found a night school for immigrant children, and a free school for African-American children in 1870. She returned to Cincinnati in 1885 to help when the provincial superior, Sister Superior Louise Van der Schrieck, became ill. She later took up the position of provincial superior in 1886, with responsibility for the order's 26 houses. She worked to improve the schools' academic quality by standardising the curriculum, leading to a common studies course being published in 1888. She founded 14 new convents as provincial superior, including an orphanage in San Jose, California and a large novitiate in Waltham, Massachusetts. She also oversaw the houses in California from 1897 to 1901.

In 1897, she began making plans with Sister Mary Euphrasia for a multi-denominational college near the Catholic University of America (CUA) in Washington, DC. This plan was rejected by the Catholic hierarchy, with concerns about locating a women's college so close to the CUA. Undeterred, McGroarty continued with her plans, purchasing 33 acres in Brookland area of the city. The archbishop of Baltimore and supporter of her plans, James Gibbons, laid the cornerstone for Trinity Washington University on 8 December 1899. The first class commenced on 7 November 1900 with 22 students.

McGroarty died while visiting a convent in Peabody, Massachusetts on 12 November 1901. Her body was transported back to Cincinnati, and she is buried at the chapel of the Summit School, a school which she founded.
