= Sainte-Julie =

Sainte-Julie may refer to:

- Sainte-Julie, Quebec, a suburb of Montreal
- Sainte-Julie, Centre-du-Québec, Quebec, now part of Laurierville
- Sainte-Julie, Ain, France

== See also ==
- Saint Julie (disambiguation)
