= Notre Dame Mission Volunteers – AmeriCorps =

Non-profit organization

Established	1992
Exec. Dir.	Sister Katherine "Sissy" Corr
Office	Baltimore, MD, USA;
Homepage	www.ndmva.org

Notre Dame Mission Volunteers is a faith-based non-profit organization founded by the Sisters of Notre Dame de Namur in 1992. In 1995, NDMV sought a partnership with AmeriCorps to allow for an increase in the number of members, offering greater community service in financially limited sites. This partnership formed Notre Dame Mission Volunteers AmeriCorps. The program began with 46 service members placed in four communities: Baltimore, Boston, Cincinnati, and Apopka, Florida. Building on the initial success of these four sites, NDMVA has continued to systematically extend the range and depth of its AmeriCorps program. Notre Dame Mission Volunteers AmeriCorps members serve in seventeen sites across the United States. Notre Dame Mission Volunteers also has a separate international program in which members currently serve in four international sites in Brazil, Haiti, Nigeria, and Peru. Its National Office is currently based out of Baltimore, Maryland.

== Mission ==
NDMV serves in memory of St. Julie Billiart who sought to educate those in most need. The organization seeks to break the cycle of poverty through education and literacy, giving communities the strength they need to sustain them and live out their good – given potential. NDMV members provide hands-on support to economically disadvantaged communities. They tutor children and adults (literacy, GED, and ESL), organize after-school enrichment activities, model and teach conflict resolution and parental effectiveness, and involve community professionals in the learning process.

== Communities served through AmeriCorps ==
NDMV's National Direct AmeriCorps Program has 22 sites across the United States. These sites cater to the unique needs of the communities in their city to carry out the mission of NDMV. The cities currently served by NDMVA members are: Apopka, Florida; Atlanta, Georgia; Baltimore, Maryland; Bend, Oregon; Boston, Massachusetts; Boulder, Colorado; Chicago, Illinois; Cincinnati, Ohio; Dayton, Ohio; Hartford, Connecticut; Los Angeles, California; New Orleans, Louisiana; New York City, New York; Pine Apple, Alabama; Philadelphia, Pennsylvania; Phoenix, Arizona; San Diego, California; San Francisco, California; Seattle, Washington; Tampa, Florida; Washington, DC; Watsonville, California; and Wilmington, Delaware. National Direct NDMVA members serve as teacher's aides, tutors, mentors, and program coordinators to serve the disenfranchised helping them gain empowerment through education.

Additionally, NDMVA has partnered with the NativityMiguel Network of Schools in 17 additional sites across the country. Members serving in Nativity Schools serve as intern teachers in schools targeting low-income middle school students in an effort to prevent them from dropping out of school.

== Communities served internationally ==
NDMV's International Program is a more recent addition to the service work completed by the organization. The international work is entirely separate from the AmeriCorps grant, thus making it a much smaller program. NDMV initially set its sights on serving communities in Africa and South America along with the Sisters of Notre Dame de Namur. In 2006, NDMV sent volunteers to Malava, Kenya and Tambogrande, Peru.

Currently, the organization sends volunteers to work in schools and orphanages working with children in cities or villages in four countries. The cities currently served include Anapu, Brazil; Les Cayes, Haiti; Lima, Peru; Tambogrande, Peru; Amoyo, Nigeria; and Enugu, Nigeria. 2012 will mark the first year that volunteers will be sent to Les Cayes, Haiti.
