= Chaminade Julienne High School =

Private school in Dayton, Ohio, US

Chaminade Julienne Catholic High School

Location
- 505 South Ludlow Street; Dayton, (Montgomery County), Ohio 45402; USA; 39°45′11″N 84°11′34″W

Information
- Type: Private
- Religious affiliation: Roman Catholic
- Established: 1850; 176 years ago 1973 (merger of former schools)
- Oversight: Sisters of Notre Dame de Namur; Society of Mary
- President: Dan Meixner
- Principal: Greg Mueller
- Grades: 9-12
- Gender: co-educational
- Enrollment: 698 (2018–19)
- Student to teacher ratio: 16.5:1
- Colors: Blue, Green & White
- Mascot: Eagle
- Accreditation: North Central Association of Colleges and Schools
- Annual tuition: $11,760
- Website: www.cjeagles.org

Chaminade Julienne Catholic High School is a private, co-educational, center-city, Catholic high school. It is located in downtown Dayton, in the U.S. state of Ohio, and is owned and operated by the Society of Mary and the Sisters of Notre Dame de Namur. It is named after Blessed William Joseph Chaminade and St. Julie Billiart.

== History ==
In 1886, the Sisters of Notre Dame de Namur founded Notre Dame Academy in downtown Dayton, a private secondary school for girls. In 1927, the Sisters were forced to move to a larger facility, and Julienne High School was formed in honor of the founder of the sisterhood, St. Julie Billiart.

The Society of Mary, founded by Blessed William Joseph Chaminade, founded St. Mary's Institute in 1850, with both secondary and college level programs. St. Mary's became the University of Dayton in 1920. With the Sisters leaving the downtown Dayton site, the Marianists purchased the old Notre Dame Academy building and opened Chaminade High School, a Catholic high school for boys.

Because enrollment decreased as times changed, the two schools merged in 1973 to create Chaminade Julienne High School. CJ students come from 45 different grade schools and more than 50 ZIP Codes.

== Athletics ==
Chaminade Julienne's athletic program has been very competitive in city, regional, and state contests since the school's founding. The school's mascot is the Eagle, and its colors are blue and green. The boys' teams compete in the Greater Catholic League and the girls' teams compete in the Girls' Greater Catholic League.

Chaminade Julienne High School began playing football in 1927. The Eagles rose to dominance in the 1940s and 1950s. Over a 20-year span (1940-1959), the "Men of Chaminade" won 16 City League championship and compiled a record of 138–38–9.

In 1966 and 1970, the basketball team won the large school Division State Championships. In 1970 the baseball team won the large school Division State Championship. The 1970 Baseball Team is the only Dayton school to win the large school division baseball State Championship.

In 1982, the Chaminade Julienne men's soccer team brought home the state championship, and the women's volleyball team became a perennial powerhouse, earning multiple district and regional titles for several years. In 1991, the men's basketball team was state runner-up. Both the cross country and track teams produced championships in 1993 and 1994, and the women's basketball team took CJ to the state tournament in 1998 for the first time in the school's history. Returning to state the next year, the women's basketball team brought home the 1999 State Division II championship title. The women's team returned to state and won the State Division II Championship again in 2003. In 2004 they were Division I State Runner-up and returned in 2005 to win the Division I State Championship.

In 2002 the football team was the first team from Dayton to win the State Championship (D-II). The girls' basketball team once again captured the state championship title in 2003 and 2005. They were also recognized as the number one girls' high school basketball team by USA Today.

In 2005, the women's tennis team made its first trip to the OHSAA state tournament. It placed fourth in state, and boasted three individual players also going to state and reaching the quarterfinals. The graduating class of 2005 had five students receive division I athletic scholarships. In 2006, the girls' team was back at state again, and placed third in the OHSAA tournament. In 2006, CJ sent four players to the state tournament, three of whom reached the tournament in 2005.In 2007, the team placed third again in the division one state championships. Four players qualified for the individual state tournament.

In October 2011, the Division II women's golf team — having existed for five years (since 2007) — became the first Eagles golf team to win a state title since 1933, when the boys of Chaminade High School were crowned city and state champs.

In June 2018, the Chaminade Julienne Eagles baseball team won the OHSAA Division II state tournament. The following year (2019) Chaminade Julienne Eagles baseball team completed their quest for back to back by again taking home the OHSAA Division II state tournament championship.

=== State championships ===
- Boys' football – 2002
- Boys' basketball - 1966, 1970
- Baseball - 1970, 2018, 2019
- Boys' soccer - 1982
- Boys' golf - 1929, 1933
- Girls' basketball - 1999, 2003, 2005, 2026
- Girls' golf - 2011
- Girls' track and field - 2026

== Notable alumni ==
Athletics

- Derrick Brown – basketball player, Charlotte Bobcats (NBA)
- Megan Duffy – basketball player (WNBA), current head women's basketball head coach, Virginia Tech
- Gerry Faust – head football coach, University of Notre Dame
- Ron Hunter – college basketball coach
- Gary Kosins – football player (NFL)
- Brandon McKinney – football player (NFL)
- Tamika Raymond (née Williams) – basketball player (WNBA)
- Javon Ringer – football player (NFL)
- Jerry Smith - football player (NFL)

Clergy/Religious

- Paul Francis Leibold – Archbishop of Cincinnati
- Dorothy Stang - member of Sisters of Notre Dame de Namur, martyred environmental and anti-poverty activist

Education

- Roderick J. McDavis - first African-American president of Ohio University

Historic Preservation

- Jerry Sharkey - Wright brothers historian

Media

- Joe Estevez – screen actor, director, and producer
- Mike Gallagher - radio personality
- Amy Schneider – Jeopardy! champion, and the first openly transgender contestant to qualify for the Tournament of Champions
- Martin Sheen – screen actor
- Katt Williams – Comedian

Military

- Maj. Gen. John D. Altenburg – U.S. Army head of military commissions
