= Saint Julie Billiart Parish =

Parish in San Jose, California, US

St. Julie Billiart Parish
- Location within San Jose, California
- 37°13′37″N 121°48′09″W
- Location: 366 St. Julie Drive; San Jose, California
- Country: USA
- Denomination: Roman Catholic
- Website: www.stjulies-dsj.org

History
- Status: Parish church
- Dedication: Saint Julie Billiart

Architecture
- Functional status: Active

Administration
- Province: Ecclesiastical province of San Francisco
- Archdiocese: Archidioecesis Sancti Francisci
- Diocese: Dioecesis Sancti Josephi in California
- Deanery: Deanery 7

Clergy
- Bishop: The Most Rev. Oscar Cantú
- Vicar: Rev. Fr. Arthur Yabes
- Dean: Rev. Fr. Christopher Bennett (Santa Teresa Parish)
- Pastor: Rev. Fr. Tito Cartagenas

Saint Julie Billiart Parish is a Roman Catholic parish of the Diocese of San Jose in California, located in the Santa Teresa neighborhood of San Jose, California. The parish is named for Saint Julie Billiart, the foundress of the Sisters of Notre Dame de Namur.

== See also ==
- Roman Catholic Diocese of San Jose in California
