= Sue Povey =

British geneticist (1942–2019)

Professor Sue Povey FMedSci
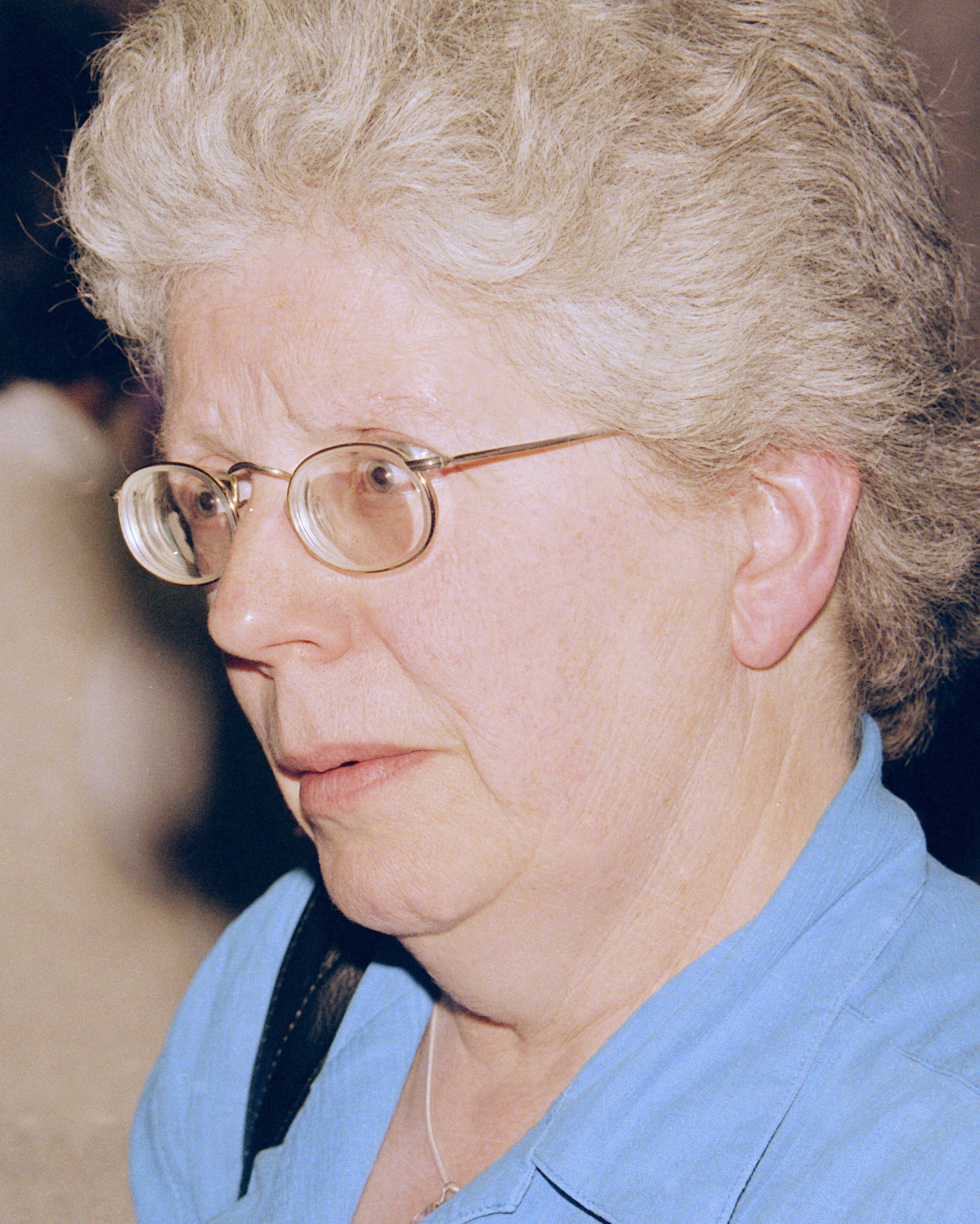
- Povey in July 2001
- Born: Margaret Susan Povey; 24 April 1942
- Died: 11 January 2019 (aged 76); London
- Scientific career
- Fields: Genetics
- Institutions: Medical Research Council; UCL

Professor Susan Povey FMedSci (24 April 1942 – 11 January 2019), was a British geneticist.

== Life ==
She was born in Leeds, the daughter of Jack Povey, a physics teacher at St Michael's College, and his wife Margaret Robertson, a paediatrician who was the first female graduate of Leeds Medical School. She was educated at Notre Dame Collegiate School for Girls, and then entered Girton College, Cambridge.

Povey graduated with a degree from the University of Cambridge in 1967, after reading Genetics in Part II of the Natural Sciences Tripos. She subsequently completed her medical training at University College London (UCL) before clinical training appointments in Liverpool and Huddersfield. She then completed a diploma in tropical medicine, and spent a year in Algeria working for Save the Children.

From 1970 to 2000 she was at the Medical Research Council's Human Biochemical Genetics Unit at the Department of Human Genetics and Biometry, UCL.

She served as chair of the HUGO Gene Nomenclature Committee from 1996-2007, leading work to agree and assign a single name for every human gene.

She was Haldane Professor of Human Genetics, at University College London from 2000 to 2007, becoming Emeritus on retirement.

She was elected a Fellow of the Academy of Medical Sciences (FMedSci) in 2000.

Povey died on 11 January 2019, aged 76.
