= Sisters of Notre Dame of Coesfeld =

Roman Catholic religious congregation for women

The Sisters of Notre Dame of Coesfeld is a Catholic religious institute. Members use the postnominal letters SND. The congregation was founded in Coesfeld, Germany, during a time of religious and social need. In 1849, Hilligonde Wolbring and Elisabeth Kuhling took in orphaned and neglected children, and educated and cared for them. Wolbring and Kuling established the Sisters of Notre Dame of Coesfeld to continue their work. During Kulturkampf, the sisters were forced to leave Coesfeld, and traveled to the U.S. where they taught in parishes in Ohio and Kentucky and, eventually, in many other locations. Sr. Mary Ann Culpert, SND is the current superior general of the congregation.

== History ==
=== Coesfeld ===
Hilligonde Wolbring was born in 1828 in the Netherlands and Elisabeth Kuling was born in 1822 in Munster, Germany. They both attended the Royal Teacher Training Seminar for Women in Munster and began teaching at St. Lambert Parish in Coesfeld, Westphalia. While teaching at St. Lambert, Wolbring and Kuling taking in orphaned and neglected children, and realized that they wanted to expand their work with children. Initially, the two teachers moved into a house with seven girls. Hilligonde, who was orphaned at an early age, used her entire inheritance to fund their endeavor.

The parish priest at St. Lambert, Father Theodore Elting, suggested that Wolbring and Kuling establish a religious congregation which would give them a more solid financial economic basis. Three sisters of the Sisters of Notre Dame de Namur traveled from Amersfoort, Netherlands, to instruct Wolbring and Kuhling, based on their congregation which was founded by St. Julie Billiart in 1804. Wolbring (Sister Maria Aloysia) and Kuling (Sister Maria Ignatia) formally established the Sisters of Notre Dame of Coesfeld on 1 October 1850, and Father Elting acquired an abandoned former convent, St. Annathal, to serve as the first motherhouse. The Prussian Government objecting to teachers dependent on foreign authority, the sisters were compelled to sever their relations with the mother-house in Holland and to erect their own at Coesfeld. In 1855, the Sisters of Notre Dame of Coesfeld became an independent congregation, and on 5 October 1856, Mother Maria Anna, from Munster, Germany, was elected the first superior general.

In 1871, a set of policies called Kulturkampf was established in the Kingdom of Prussia under Prime Minister Otto von Bismarck. Kulturkampf was an attempt to secularize the state and reduce the influence of religion. By 1875, rules were enacted forbidding religious congregation from teaching in school, and all religious foundations were given six months to leave the country.

=== Cleveland ===
In 1874, Bishop Richard Gilmour invited Mother Maria Chrystoma (superior general from 1872 to 1895) to send six sisters to Cleveland, Ohio to teach in the parish. She accepted, and in June 1874, Mother Maria Chrystoma, sister Maria Aloysia, and six other sisters boarded a ship in Bremen, Germany and sailed for the U.S. Two months later, the sisters began teaching in Cleveland and Covington, Kentucky.

In the next four years about 200 sisters came to the U.S. to teach. Eventually, three provinces were established in Covington, Toledo, Ohio, and Los Angeles, California. In 1947, the motherhouse was established in Rome, Italy.

Sister Maria Aloysia, who had been part of the first group to travel to the U.S., died in 1889 and was buried in St Joseph Cemetery, Cleveland, Ohio. Sister Maria Ignatia died in 1869.

Notre Dame College in South Euclid, Ohio was founded in 1922.

== Present day ==
The Sisters of Notre Dame is an international congregation of over 2,000 women religious serving in sixteen countries.

In the 21st century, the Sisters of Notre Dame have provinces all over the world and, in 2008, a province was re-established in Coesfeld. The Immaculate Conception Province is based in Chardon, Ohio; the province has regional centers in Chardon, Ohio, Covington, Kentucky, Los Angeles, California, and Toledo, Ohio.
