= Notre Dame Catholic Sixth Form College =

Location
- St. Mark's Avenue; Yorkshire & Humbershire; Leeds, West Yorkshire, LS2 9BL; England; 53.81075°N 1.55289°W

Information
- Type: Sixth form college
- Motto: Ah! Qu'il est bon le Bon dieu (Ah! How good is the Good Lord)
- Religious affiliation: Christianity
- Denomination: Roman Catholic
- Established: c. 1904
- Founder: Sisters of Notre Dame de Namur
- School district: Public School
- Local authority: Leeds City Council
- Department for Education URN: 130548 Tables
- Ofsted: Reports
- Chair: David Wright
- Principal: Justine Barlow
- Chaplain: Andrew Sullivan
- Gender: Mixed
- Age range: 16-19
- Enrolment: c. 2,000
- Average class size: 20
- Language: English
- Hours in school day: 7
- Former name: Notre Dame Grammar School
- Diocese: Leeds
- Website: www.notredamecoll.ac.uk

Notre Dame is a Catholic Sixth Form College in Leeds, West Yorkshire, England. The college is situated on Saint Mark's Avenue, near the engineering departments of the University of Leeds in Woodhouse, Leeds. It is near the (formerly C of E) St Mark's Church, Woodhouse, Leeds, and the Leeds Universities Catholic Church and Centre. It provides A-Level and vocational full-time courses in further education.

== History ==
In 1898 the Sisters of Notre Dame de Namur came to Leeds and to the two-classroom parish school of St Anne's situated behind it. In 1904 the main part of what is now the Sixth Form College was built and opened as Notre Dame Collegiate School for Girls from the age of eleven to fourteen.

Notre Dame was one of three catholic direct grant grammar schools in Leeds, and the second that was all-female from 1946. It later was known as Notre Dame Grammar School. The school was handed over to the diocese in the 1970s when the Sisters of Notre Dame changed their focus to education in developing countries.

The school became Notre Dame High School in 1978, a catholic comprehensive school for ages 13–19 with around 650 girls. All the other Catholic direct grant schools in Leeds also changed this year.

The sixth form college was formed in September 1989 as the sixth form centre for Catholic education in Leeds. It was decided to merge the boys and girls sixth forms together in one college (from, Notre Dame High School itself, Mount St Mary's, St Michael's College and Cardinal Heenan Catholic High School). For nearly ninety years before this, a girls' school was present on the same site. This was one of a network of girls' secondary schools in England and Scotland which belonged to the Sisters of Notre Dame de Namur. Admissions for girls (Year 3, age 13–14 years old) ceased in 1989, with the school pupils present moving up each year, and a growing number of Sixth Form admissions.

== Admissions ==
Notre Dame currently has a student body of approximately 2,000 pupils between the 2 years (of A levels); giving it a ten times larger student body than the average Leeds Sixth form. It is a Roman Catholic faith institution and the only one of that denomination in the city for ages 16–18.

== Notable alumni ==
- Matty Lee
- Gabby Logan
- Jonathan Mason (actor)
- Akierra Missick, Turks and Caicos Islands politician and lawyer

=== Notre Dame Collegiate School for Girls ===
- Prof Monica Grady, Professor of Planetary and Space Sciences since 2005 at the Open University, who gave the Royal Institution Christmas Lectures in 2003
- Dorothy Knowles (academic)
- Prof Sue Povey, Girton-College-educated geneticist, Haldane Professor of Human Genetics from 2000-07 at UCL, the daughter of a Physics teacher at the boys' RC grammar school
- Marion Ryan, singer

== See also ==
- List of direct grant grammar schools
- Notre Dame High School (Sheffield)
