= Saint Julia =

Saint Julia is the name of:

- Julia of Troyes (died 272), virgin and martyr
- St. Julia (died 303), Iberian-peninsula servant, victim in massacre that included religious leader Engratia
- Julia of Lisbon (died 303), early Christian saint and martyr
- Julia of Corsica (died c. 439), Roman religious leader
- Julie Billiart (1751–1816), French religious leader
- St. Julia (1865–1939), Austrian-born religious leader a.k.a. Ursula Ledóchowska
