= Centre for Mechanochemical Cell Biology =

English research centre

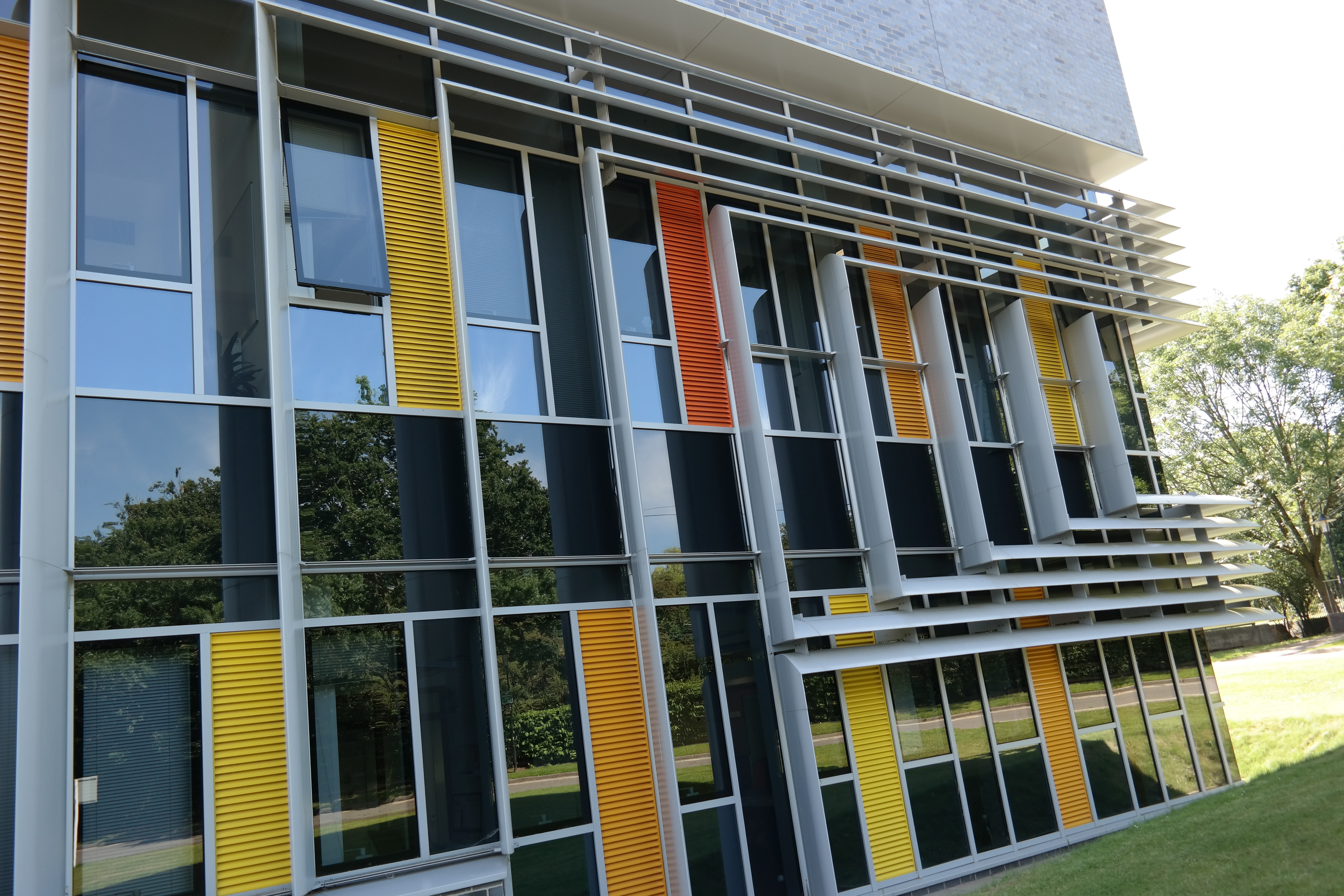
- Established: 2010
- Director: Robert Cross
- Faculty: 21
- Address: Gibbet Hill Road, Coventry CV4 7AL
- Location: Coventry, United Kingdom
- Coordinates: 52°22′25.98″N 1°33′8.07″W
- Interactive map of Centre for Mechanochemical Cell Biology
- Website: mechanochemistry.org

The Centre for Mechanochemical Cell Biology (CMCB) is a research centre at the University of Warwick, specialising in quantitative, biophysical approaches to cell biology. The Centre was founded by Robert Cross, Andrew McAinsh and Anne Straube when they relocated from the Marie Curie Research Institute in Oxted, Surrey, UK to Warwick Medical School. It has expanded to become an inter-disciplinary centre with research groups led by principal investigators from Physics, Computer Science, Maths and Warwick Medical School.

Research groups in the centre focus on themes such as cell division, cytoskeleton, molecular motors and membrane traffic. They are supported by Wellcome Trust, Cancer Research UK, Medical Research Council (United Kingdom) and Biotechnology and Biological Sciences Research Council. Notable scientists in CMCB include Andrew McAinsh (2018 Hooke Medal Winner), Stephen Royle (2021 Hooke Medal Winner) and Anne Straube (Lister Institute Prize Fellow). Many of the groups are located in the Mechanochemical Cell Biology Building on the Gibbet Hill Campus. The building was opened in April 2012 by Nobel Prize laureate Paul Nurse. An extension to the building was subsequently built and opened by Nobel Prize winning cell biologist Randy Schekman in 2016.

During the COVID-19 pandemic, the virtual seminar series "Motors in Quarantine" was initiated by CMCB scientists led by Prof. Anne Straube.

== Faculty ==
As of 2023 there are 21 Group Leaders in the Centre.

Group Leaders:

1. Mohan Balasubramanian
2. Andrew Blanks
3. Andrew Bowman
4. Till Bretschneider
5. Nigel Burroughs
6. Robert Cross
7. Samuel Dean
8. Seamus Holden
9. Vasily Kantsler
10. Darius Koester
11. Andrew McAinsh
12. Masanori Mishima
13. Justin Molloy
14. Marco Polin
15. Aparna Ratheesh
16. Stephen Royle
17. Karuna Sampath
18. Timothy Saunders
19. Michael Smutny
20. Anne Straube
21. Matthew Turner
