= Serviam Girls Academy =

Location
- 900 N Washington Street; Wilmington, Delaware 19801; United States
- 39°44′47.8″N 75°33′06.5″W

Information
- Type: Private
- Motto: Serviam (I will serve.)
- Patron saints: Angela Merici and Saint Ursula
- Established: 2008
- Grades: 5–8
- Enrollment: Approximately 60
- School fees: $500
- Website: http://www.serviamgirlsacademy.org

Serviam Girls Academy is a private school in Wilmington, Delaware, offering classes in grades 5–8 for girls. Established in 2008 as an Ursuline school, it is modeled after schools in the NativityMiguel Network of Schools. The current enrollment is approximately 60 students, most of whom live in New Castle, Newark, and the City of Wilmington. The school has a brother school, Nativity Preparatory School, which is also located in Wilmington.

The Academy seeks to provide a tuition-free education for low-income girls in grades 5-8. The school's program includes an extended school day and school year, small class size, a mandatory summer program, and support to its graduates in high school and college.

== The NativityMiguel Network ==
The 61 schools following the model of the NativityMiguel Network of Schools serve over 4,400 students across 27 states. Serviam and these other schools share the following characteristics:

- Tuition-free
- Faith-based
- Longer school day and extended school year
- Small classes
- Emphasis on parental involvement
- Graduate support program in high school and through college admissions.

Founded in 1971, the Network's model has proven effective in multiple areas, most notably in terms of graduates' long-term achievements. 74% of the Network's middle school graduates enter private or independent high schools, whereas the national average for minorities is 6%. 79% of alumni graduate high school in four years, compared to the national average of 55% for comparable students. 61% of the Network's high school graduates enroll in colleges and universities, a rate almost 30% higher than the national average for low income students. 55.7% of the alumni are graduates of colleges or trade institutions, whereas the national average for similar students is 21%.

Serviam graduated its first class of alumnae in 2011. As of summer 2012, the Academy has 15 alumnae attending Delcastle Technical School, Howard High School of Technology, Sanford School, The Tatnall School, Wilmington Christian School, Ursuline Academy, Padua Academy, St. Mark's High School, Layton Preparatory School, and Archmere Academy.

== Admissions ==
Applications are considered on a rolling basis from January through August. Candidates for admission should be entering grades 5 or 6, and all families must qualify for participation under the federal National School Lunch Act.

== Academics ==
Each grade takes classes in math, reading, writing and grammar, science, social studies, and religion. In addition, each class has a silent supervised hour of homework during which their teachers are available for further assistance and tutors are available for more in-depth one-on-one help. Followed by an enrichment hour where area businesses and individuals coach the students in a variety of projects and skill building exploratory programs.

== Spirituality ==
Serviam's patron saints are Angela Merici and Saint Ursula, both of whom were strong women dedicated to guiding young women to live in the light of God. Serviam girls strive to live in the spirit of their patron saints, giving particular focus to their commitment to the service of others. Serviam, itself, translates to "I Will Serve", and students are encouraged to participate in service to both the Serviam community and the community at large.
