= Françoise Blin de Bourdon =

Marie Louise Françoise Blin de Bourdon, SNDdeN (also known as Mother St. Joseph; 8 March 1756 – 9 February 1838) was a French noblewoman and Catholic nun. She is known for being a co-foundress of the Sisters of Notre Dame de Namur.

== Biography ==
Françoise Blin de Bourdon was a native of Picardy. Her family belonged to the old nobility of France. She was the youngest child of Viscount Pierre Louis Blin de Bourdon and the Baroness Marie Louise Claudine de Fouquesolles. She received her early training at the home of her maternal grandmother. From the age of six years until she made her First Holy Communion, she attended the school of the Bernardines; she completed her education with the Ursulines of Amiens.

When Françoise was nineteen, she left Gézaincourt for Bourdon, as her parents wished her to make her debut into society. For several years she was one of the gayest members of the brilliant society of her time and was presented at the Court of Louis XVI and Marie Antoinette. For a while the charms of the world dazzled her, but she soon tired of what seemed to her a frivolous, useless life. She became more religiously oriented.

Thus her life passed happily until the Reign of Terror loosed its madness on the land. Early in 1793 her aged father was imprisoned at Amiens; a few months later she herself was dragged from her home by a frantic mob, all in the name of Liberty. She was taken to a house of detention at Amiens where she learned that her father, her brother, his wife, and child were all prisoners. Her entreaties to see them were harshly silenced. Every day a long list of victims was announced for execution. After seven months' imprisonment, she read the names of her father and herself among the proscribed. The day set for their execution was July 29, 1794, but their lives were saved by the fall of Robespierre on the preceding day, As her grandmother had died from the effect of so many horrors, Françoise, after her release from prison, returned to the home of her brother in the Rue des Augustins.

After these experiences, she became even more oriented toward a religious style of life. She found the person who could guide her in Julie Billiart, also of Picardy. Françoise was not at first attracted to Julie and she found her visits embarrassing. This was due to Julie's paralysis, which caused difficulties of speech. Gradually the two women were able to work together on religious projects and became co-workers in the area. They found other women willing to work with them for the church and the poor.

Their first years were not easy, but gradually they recognized a call to unite. In Amiens, the foundation of the Sisters of Notre Dame de Namur was laid in August, 1803. It had for its object the salvation of the souls of poor children. The first members. were Julie Billiart, Françoise Blin, and Catherine Duchatel, a young lady from Rheims. A provisional Rule was drawn up by Father Varin. On the Feast of the Purification, February 2, 1804, they solemnly consecrated themselves to the new Institute. The first 10 branch houses, established before 1816, were all in present day Belgium and in 1809 the headquarters were moved to Namur.

In 1816 Julie Billiart died, and her position as head of the Sisters of Notre Dame was taken over by Blin de Bourdon, or Sr. St. Joseph, as she was known among the Sisters. Between 1815 and 1830 Belgium was part of the Netherlands, and William I of the Netherlands had imposed restrictions on teaching institutions, which Sr. St. Joseph diligently followed to save the institute. During his tour in 1829, King William visited the establishment at Namur and was so pleased that he gave the Mother General Dutch citizenship. She founded houses at Thuin, 1817; Namur Orphanage, 1823; Hospital St. Jacques, 1823; Verviers, 1827; Hospital d'Harscamp; and Bastogne, 1836 – which had been for the past thirty years a state normal school; Philippeville, 1837. The Revolution of 1830 and the assumption of the crown of Belgium by Leopold of Saxe-Gotha had put an end to petty persecutions of religious.

The most important work of Mother St. Joseph's generalate was the compiling and collating of the Rules and Constitution of the Sisters of Notre Dame. She left an explanation of the Rules, the particular rule of each office, and the Directory and Customs. She had preserved a faithful record of all that Mother Julie had said or written on these points. She also drew up a system of instruction based upon that of St. John Baptist de La Salle for the French Brothers of the Christian Schools. Mother St. Joseph was twice re-elected superior-general, the term being at first fixed at ten years. To give greater stability to the government of the institute, a general chapter unanimously approved extension to life-tenure for the office of superior-general.

Mother St. Joseph continued her work as head of the Sisters of Notre Dame until her death in 1838. Her great work was the compiling and collation of the Rules and Constitutions of the Sisters of Notre Dame. Its basic principles lasted until the changes of the Second Vatican Council.
