= Maryvale Preparatory School =

Private school in Lutherville, Maryland, United States

Location
- 11300 Falls Road; Lutherville, (Baltimore County), Maryland 21023; United States; 39°25′48″N 76°41′8″W

Information
- Type: Private
- Religious affiliation: Roman Catholic
- Established: September 9, 1945
- President: Malika Delancey
- Principal: Jennifer Nicholas
- Grades: 6–12
- Gender: Girls
- Average class size: 12
- Student to teacher ratio: 9:1
- Campus size: 115 acres (0.47 km^{2})
- Colors: Red and Grey
- Song: O Maryvale
- Athletics conference: IAAM A & B conference
- Mascot: Lion
- Team name: Lions
- Rival: Notre Dame Prep
- Accreditation: Middle States Association of Colleges and Schools
- Publication: Miscellany (literary magazine)
- Newspaper: The Grey Towers
- Tuition: $19,600 for 2017-2018 school year
- Dean of Students: Jessica Vitrano Randisi
- Athletic Director: Theresa Moeser
- Website: http://www.maryvale.com

Maryvale Preparatory School is a Catholic, independent school for girls in grades six through 12. Affiliated with the Sisters of Notre Dame de Namur, Maryvale is located in Lutherville, Maryland. It is also affiliated with the Roman Catholic Archdiocese of Baltimore.

== Background ==
After purchasing Wickliffe Castle from Dr. Walter Wickes, the Sisters of Notre Dame de Namur opened Maryvale Trinity College Preparatory School on Sept. 9, 1945 with only 12 boarders and eight day students. In June 1954, the school began its transition to a day school only, with the last of its boarders graduating in 1956. In 1976, the school finished its evolution, becoming a day school for young women in grades six through 12. It has a long tradition of affiliation to the Virgin Mary. The combined Middle and Upper Schools have approximately 410 students. The current president of the school is Malika DeLancey.

== School Traditions ==
=== School Ring ===
Students have the option of purchasing the school ring in silver, gold or white gold with a square garnet stone. On one side is engraved the graduating year of the student above a lion, the school's mascot; the other side has engraved the school's name above the Maryvale crest. Students can have their names or initials engraved on the inside of the ring. Students are presented with the Maryvale ring in December of their junior year, in conjunction with the holy day of the Immaculate Conception of Mary. A common tradition among students is to have their ring "turned" while on their finger a certain number of times between receiving it at the Ring Ceremony and attending the Junior Ring Dance. For example, a student in the class of 2011 would have their ring turned 111 times, symbolizing her affiliation and dedication to her class.

=== School Song ===
O Maryvale, we sing to thee, Whose every slope and tree, In noble mein praises God, As born of favored soil He trod. We hail thy towers grey and lofty, Thy wings of stone so strong. Thy Mary image greeting all who come, Who for her blessing long.

Oh Maryvale, dear Maryvale, We give our hearts to thee today.

School of our Queen of lineage royal, To thee we will be loyal, For thou has taught in Christ-like way, Courageous faith and love each day. In hope, fidelity and peace, Thy spirit stands secure. Obedience, purity and zeal for truth, Marks life that will endure.

Oh Maryvale, dear Maryvale, We give our hearts to thee today.

=== Other Traditions ===
Class Colors: Within the first few weeks of freshman year, the newest Upper School class votes for two colors that will serve as a representation of their class until Graduation. The colors are used in the class banner, which is moved around the walls of the gymnasium from the freshman wall to the senior wall each year.

Red/Grey Team: Upon arriving at Maryvale, students and faculty alike are separated into two teams—the red team or the grey team. The teams accumulate points throughout the school year through various activities. The winning team, the team with the most points, is declared at the annual Gym Meet event in May.

Spirit Week: Maryvale's Spirit Week is typically held in February during the week after President's Day. The students are given the opportunity to participate in specified costume days throughout the week to promote class spirit and unity. The Middle and Upper Schools have separate competitions to win the Maryvale "Spirit Banner" at the end of the week. The Upper School winner is announced at a themed dance, which is sponsored by the Athletic Association, at the end of the week.

Gym Meet: Gym Meet is a long-standing tradition of the school, typically held on the third Friday in May. The morning of Gym Meet involves field day events, where students compete for either the Red or Grey team—which each student has been placed into at the time she began Maryvale. The morning games include relays, volleyball, kickball, dodgeball, etc. These games add points to those accumulated throughout the year by Red and Grey teams. The winning team is announced at the end of the day during an assembly in the gymnasium. In the afternoon, students participate in class marches. Each Upper School class chooses four captains who are in charge of organizing the class' theme, formations and songs. The Middle School students choose four captains to lead their red or grey team—two eighth graders, one seventh grader and one sixth grader. Each class or team chooses a theme and adjusts popular or trending song lyrics according to the theme. As the judges and other spectators watch, the classes march into themed formations that are seen from above from the bleachers. The captains also coordinate costumes that correspond to the theme in which all members of the class wear. The "judges" for the Gym Meet marches are Maryvale alumnae who decide upon the winner of the Gym Meet banner for both the Middle and Upper Schools.

Pin Ceremony: Typically in the late fall, the sophomore class receives their class pin. A ceremony is held with the entire school community and parents of the sophomores present. At the ceremony, the class reflects on their time so far at Maryvale and the girls pin each other's blazers. The pin is typically small gold letters of the graduation year, but each grade can choose their own.

Community Homeroom: Every Friday morning, the entire school community meets in the auditorium for Community Homeroom for a half hour. Run by the student council, this meeting allows any students or faculty to make announcements, share information, or give awards. College recognition for seniors, middle school sports awards, and some honor society inductions also take place during this time.

Big Sister/Little Sister: When a student enters her freshman year at Maryvale, she is partnered with a rising junior, who acts as her "Big Sister" during her first two years at the school. The school holds Big Sister/Little Sister events where the pairs can get to know each other better and form bonds within the different classes.

Senior Sleepover: The Senior Sleepover, which is a more recent tradition that began in 2004, allows the entire senior class to spend the night on campus. One evening in the spring, seniors will spend the night in the Castle, spreading out sleeping bags and pillows in the Great Hall and the Library. During the night, the seniors participate in fun activities, such as games, face painting, picture taking, etc.

Annual Maryvale Christmas Shops: During the first week of December, the school holds a holiday bazaar featuring handmade products from vendors around the Baltimore area. The current students of the school also create a product and sell it to earn money for a special item or day, such as the Ring Dance or Senior Prom. This event also features a special visit from Santa Claus, who sits in the Castle and hears from children who come to tell him what they want for Christmas.

== Student Organizations/Co-Curriculars ==
=== Student Council ===
The Upper School Student Council is responsible for planning events throughout the year for the student body, fundraising and spreading awareness of different organizations within the school. The four officers (President, Vice-President, Secretary and Treasurer) are juniors or seniors elected by the Upper School each spring, who also lead the weekly Community Homeroom for the student body. Each homeroom (about four per class) elects a representative who attends weekly meetings. There is also a Middle School Student Council of officers and homeroom representatives who are elected by the Middle School students

=== National Honor Society ===
Maryvale is home to the Sister Shawn Marie Maguire Chapter of the National Honor Society. Qualified students are inducted during her junior or senior year. NHS members must demonstrate leadership, a commitment to community service, high scholarship, and good character. Their largest event, the Tyler Fick Memorial Run, raises money for the Cystic Fibrosis foundation in honor of an alumna, Tyler Fick '99, who died from the disease shortly after her graduation. Middle School students may have the opportunity to join the St. Julie Billiart Chapter of the National Junior Honor Society, providing that they meet the necessary requirements.

=== Athletics ===
Fall Sports: Field Hockey (Varsity, JV, Middle School), Volleyball (Varsity, JV, Middle School), Soccer (Varsity, JV, Middle School), Cross Country (Varsity, JV, Middle School)

Winter Sports: Basketball (Varsity, JV, Middle School), Indoor Track & Field (Varsity, JV), Swimming (Varsity), Winter Soccer (Middle School)

Spring Sports: Lacrosse (Varsity, JV, Middle School), Outdoor Track & Field (Varsity, JV, Middle School), Softball (Varsity), Badminton (Varsity, JV)

=== Performing Arts ===
Drama: The Drama Department produces a fall and a spring play, which are typically both musicals. Upper and Middle School students make up both the cast and crew of these productions.

Choruses: The Maryvale Chorus is open by audition to students of all grades; they perform at on-campus liturgies and concerts, as well as off-campus concerts and festivals. The Maryvale Singers is a smaller choir for Upper Schoolers, while the Trinities is made up of just 9-12 Upper School students. Middle schoolers can also join the middle school choir, the Maryvale Julies.

Dance: A student-run dance troupe was formed in the fall of 2012 by its founder and inaugural president Rachel Higdon, Class of 2013. She worked hard with her vice president Anna Cuffari, to produce beautiful numbers in a variety of styles including ballet, jazz, lyrical, modern, and tap. This small but strong group performs in Maryvale shows throughout the year.

=== Other Organizations ===
The Grey Towers: school newspaper

The Lion's Tale: middle school newspaper

Miscellany: school literary magazine

Wickcliffe: school yearbook

Habitat for Humanity

PACT: Promoting Active Community Testament; founded by students from Maryvale, Seton Keough High School, Calvert Hall College High School and Mount Saint Joseph College

Social Justice Coalition (SoJuCo): Run by students to promote the service events and opportunities Maryvale offers. Popular groups under the coalition include Lunch Bunch, Empty Bowls, and Marian House.

Model UN

Mock Trial: Students compete in circuit 3 of the Maryland Mock Trial competition. The team receives either a criminal or civil case that they prepare an argument for and compete against other high schools in at the Towson Court House.

Connect 4 Cancer: Club in which students can learn about different cancers of the month and present informative presentations to the school community.

Fellowship of Christian Athletes (FCA): Maryvale’s branch of this national organization where student athletes can meet to read bible passages and pray together.

Asian Cultures Club- Upper school club that encourages students to learn about the cultures of different Asian groups.

Student Ambassador Club- School ambassador program that requires admission by application and interview. Students selected represent Maryvale at open houses, high school fairs, and other admission events throughout the year.

== The Castle at Maryvale ==
=== History ===
Wickliffe Castle, more commonly known as the Castle at Maryvale, was designed by Wilson L. Smith, a Baltimore architect at the request of Dr. Walter Wickes, who had purchased 182 acres (0.74 km^{2}) of the former Brooklandwood Estate. A present for Dr. Wickes' new bride, the home was completed after two years in 1916 for a total of $250,000. The carefully designed replica of a medieval English home has many features popular in the Tudor period and includes some authentic furniture from this period. The castle is similar in design to that of Warwick Castle, in Warwickshire, England. Dr. and Mrs. Wickes raised four children in their home.

During Prohibition, the Wickes are said to have thrown parties with alcohol. Throughout the castle, there are secret cabinets within the paneled walls that may have held alcohol. There is also a tunnel underneath the castle that ran from Wickcliffe Castle to Green Spring Valley, though it is no longer in function.

=== The Castle at Maryvale ===
Shortly after Mrs. Wickes' death, Dr. Wickes sold the property to the Sisters of Notre Dame de Namur in 1945 for $75,000. The sisters converted the home into a Catholic boarding school that opened in September 1945 with just twelve boarders and eight day students, representing almost all grades between kindergarten and 12th. The school operated as a boarding school until 1956, when the last few boarding students graduated. Much of the original furniture can still be found in the Castle, some pieces dating back to the 16th and 17th centuries.

The Castle now serves as the home to many of the administrative offices. The first floor of the Castle holds the school's library and a small chapel that is used for Catholic ceremonies, including many weddings each year. The second and third floors contain offices, classrooms, the infirmary, and a few small rooms where some Sisters of Notre Dame de Namur reside. Each year, a number of events are held in the Castle, such as the Junior Ring Dance, the Senior Sleepover and Commencement, which is held on the Terrace.

The Castle serves as a venue for outside events, such as weddings, parties and corporate events. It can also be found in popular culture, most notably in the 1997 Clint Eastwood movie, Absolute Power. Furnishings, work and renovations completed for the movie, including a drapery on the second floor and carpeting on the main staircase, were left in place.

Major renovations to the Castle were completed in 2006.

== See also ==
- National Catholic Educational Association
