= Yvonne Carter =

British general practitioner

Yvonne Carter CBE FRCGP FMedSci DL
- Born: Yvonne Helen Carter; 16 April 1959
- Died: 20 October 2009 (aged 50)
- Education: St Mary's Hospital Medical School, London
- Occupation: Dean of Warwick Medical School
- Spouse(s): Dr. Michael Bannon (1988–2009; her death); 1 son

Yvonne Helen Carter CBE DL FRCGP FMedSci (16 April 1959 – 20 October 2009) was a British general practitioner and Dean of the Warwick Medical School, a post she took up in 2004, after being the Vice-Dean. Warwick Medical School is Britain's first medical school to only accept applications from graduates.

Her career as a GP spanned 20 years, practising in a succession of inner city communities in Liverpool, Birmingham, East London and, until 2007, in Coventry. She was also an academic GP and Honorary Consultant in Primary Care at Coventry Teaching Primary Care Trust and a Non-Executive Director and Vice Chair at University Hospitals Coventry and Warwickshire NHS Trust. She was also Chair of the Comprehensive Local Research Network for West Midlands (South).

She was a Non-Executive Director of University Hospitals of Coventry and Warwickshire NHS Trust and the Pro-Vice-Chancellor for Regional Engagement at the University of Warwick. In 2008 she was appointed Deputy Lieutenant for the County of the West Midlands.

== Medical career ==
Carter attended Notre Dame High School in Liverpool. She first trained at London's St Mary's Hospital Medical School graduating in 1983 with a distinction in Obstetrics and Gynaecology.

She completed a General Practice Vocational Training Scheme in Liverpool and became a Member of the Royal College of General Practitioners (RCGP) in 1987. In 1990, she became an Honorary Research Fellow at Keele University and was awarded a three-year Royal College of General Practitioners Research Training Fellowship. She was awarded a Doctorate of Medicine in 1994 by the University of London.

From 1992 to 1996, she was a Senior Clinical Lecturer in the University of Birmingham's Department of General Practice. She became the youngest Professor of General Practice and Primary Care in the UK when she took up post as chair and Head of Department at Barts Hospital and the Queen Mary's School of Medicine and Dentistry in 1996. In 2001, she became Head of the Division of Community Sciences and in 2002, following restructuring in the School, became Director of the Institute of Community Health Sciences. She became Dean in 2003 when she moved to Warwick.

== National roles ==
In 1998, she was elected as a founder Fellow of the Academy of Medical Sciences. She was a Member of the Council of the Royal College of General Practitioners from 1994 to 2004. From 1996 to 2001 ,she was the RGCP's Chairman of Research and was also a member of the RGCP Council's executive committee. From 1995 to 1996, she was the Clinical Director of the Quality Network; from 1995 to 1997 she was a member of the Commissioning of Care Task Force and from 1998 to 2000 she was a member of the Health Inequalities Group. She is an elected member of the Council of the Academy of Medical Sciences.

She was Governor of the Health Foundation from 1999 to 2007. From 1999 to 2004, she chaired the commissioning panel for the NHS National Primary Care R&D awards. She has also been involved in the development of the Department of Health Strategy on Research Governance. She was a member of the Appraisal Committee of the National Institute for Clinical Excellence from 1998 to 2001 and a member of the National Screening Committee from 1999 to 2003.

== Awards and recognition ==
- Officer of the Most Excellent Order of the British Empire (OBE) in the 2000 Queens Birthday Honours List.
- Winner of the Confederation of British Industry First Woman of Science Award on 7 June 2006.
- In 2008 she was awarded a Coventry City Council Good Citizen Award
- Carter was appointed Commander of the Order of the British Empire (CBE) in the 2009 Birthday Honours for services to medical education.

== Family ==
Carter married Michael Bannon, a paediatrician and medical academic, in 1988. They had one child, a son, Christopher.

== Death ==
Yvonne Carter was diagnosed with breast cancer in 2004 and died from the disease on 20 October 2009, aged 50.
