= NativityMiguel Network of Schools =

The NativityMiguel Network of Schools was a nonprofit 501(c)(3) organization providing a middle school education to low-income families across the nation. The Network operated 64 schools that served over 5,000 middle school age boys and girls across 27 states. It closed in June 2012. Though the Nativity Miguel Network Central Office formally dissolved in June 2012, there are still over fifty former network schools in operation around the United States and Canada.

== Background ==
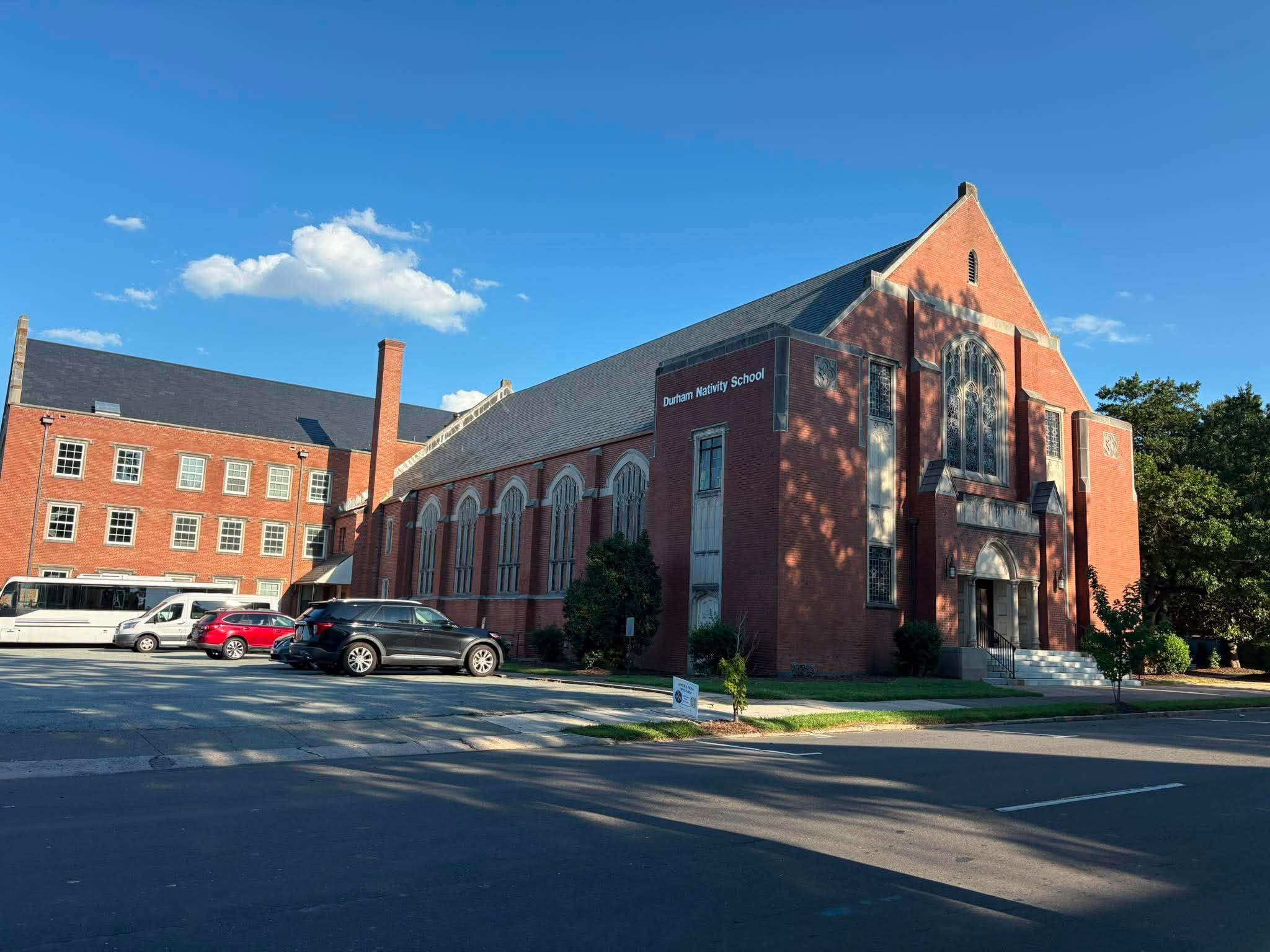
Durham Nativity School in Durham, North Carolina

In 1971, a group of Jesuits opened a middle school on the Lower East Side of Manhattan to serve the waves of Dominican and Puerto Rican immigrants settling in the area. The Nativity Mission Center provided their middle school-aged boys with an educational program in which they could excel academically, socially, and spiritually. The extended school day almost doubled that of the local public school, a low student-to-teacher ratio ensured time for one-on-one instruction, and a summer academic program extended learning year round. They made a commitment to support their graduates through high school and guide them on to college.

The Nativity Mission Center flourished, and by the 1980s had attracted the attention of Catholic educators nationwide. Replications followed creating the Nativity Network of Schools. In 1993, the Christian Brothers opened the first San Miguel School in Providence, Rhode Island. Its replication led to the formation of the Lasallian Association of Miguel Schools. In 2006, these two networks merged to form the NativityMiguel Network of Schools, allowing for a more efficient way to lead member schools to excellence in education for the underserved.

== Overview and Mission ==
The Mission of the NativityMiguel Network was to empower middle schools to provide a unique, faith-based education that breaks the cycle of poverty in underserved communities across America. The NativityMiguel model included an extended day averaging 9.6 hours and an extended year of up to 11 months. The average total enrollment at a member school was 71 students with an average class size of 19 students.

== See also ==
- Jesuits
- Serviam Girls Academy
- Notre Dame Mission Volunteers - AmeriCorps
