= Gézaincourt =

- Commune
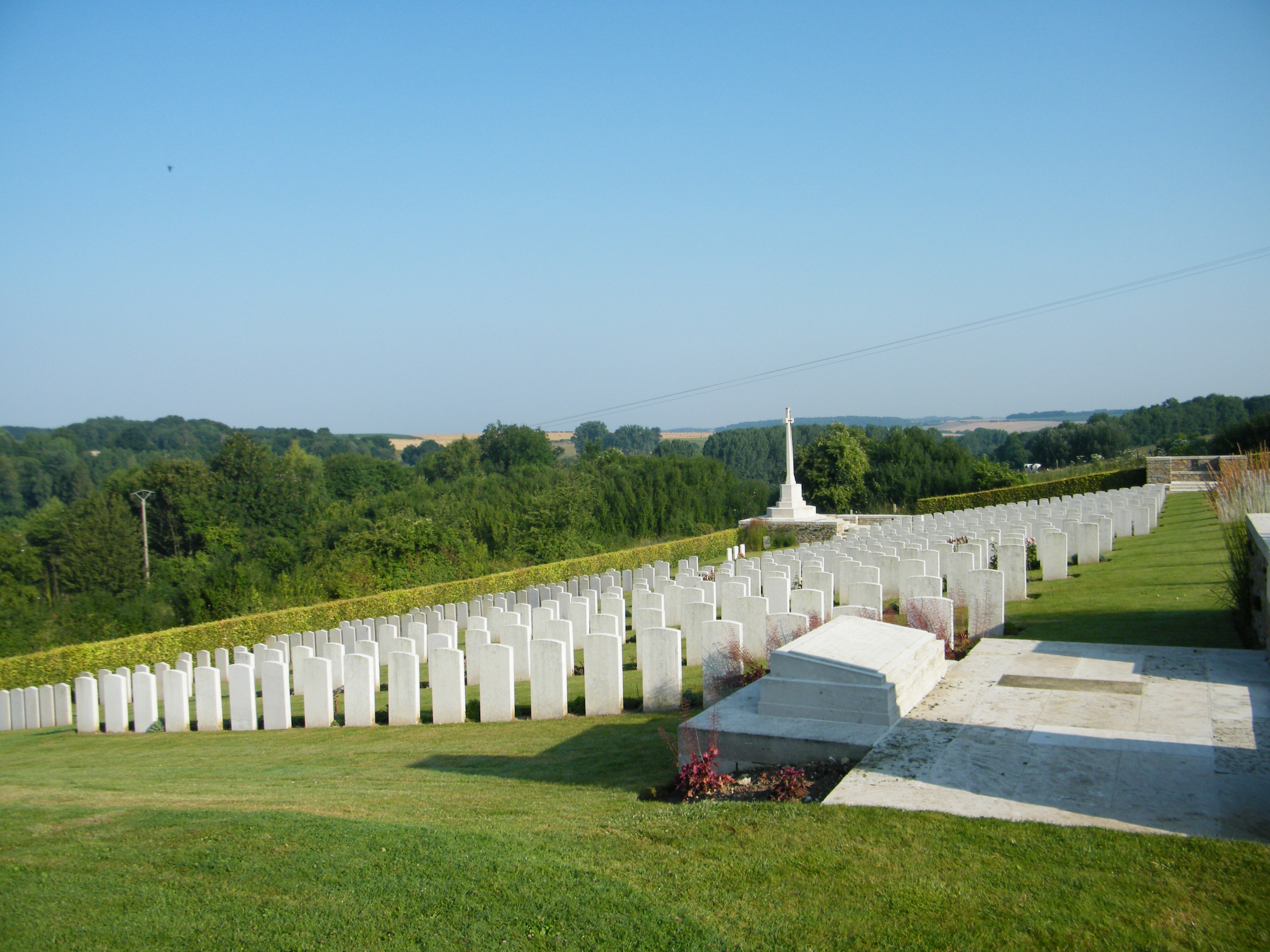
- The war cemetery in Gézaincourt
- Location of Gézaincourt
- Location within France Location within Hauts-de-France
- Coordinates: 50°08′30″N 2°19′13″E
- Country: France
- Region: Hauts-de-France
- Department: Somme
- Arrondissement: Amiens
- Canton: Doullens
- Intercommunality: CC Territoire Nord Picardie

Government
  - Mayor (2020–2026): Martine Botte
- Area^{1}: 6.97 km^{2} (2.69 sq mi)
- Elevation: 85 m (279 ft)
- Highest elevation: 142 m (466 ft)
- Lowest elevation: 54 m (177 ft)
- Population (2023): 399
  - Density: 57.2/km^{2} (148/sq mi)
- Time zone: UTC+01:00 (CET)
  - Summer (DST): UTC+02:00 (CEST)
- INSEE/Postal code: 80377 /80600
- ^{1} French Land Register data, which excludes lakes, ponds, glaciers > 1 km^{2} (0.386 sq mi or 247 acres) and river estuaries.

Gézaincourt (French pronunciation: [ʒezɛ̃kuʁ]) is a commune in the Somme department in Hauts-de-France in northern France.

== Geography ==
The commune is situated on the D128 road, some 25 miles (40 km) east-northeast of Abbeville, near the banks of the river Authie.

== Personalities ==
Mother St. Joseph was born here on March 8, 1756

== Population ==
Historical population
Year	Pop.	±% p.a.
1968	505	—
1975	497	−0.23%
1982	470	−0.79%
1990	476	+0.16%
1999	466	−0.24%
2007	440	−0.72%
2012	399	−1.94%
2017	428	+1.41%
2023	399	−1.16%
Source: INSEE

== See also ==
- Communes of the Somme department
