= St Julie's Catholic High School =

Location
- Speke Road; Liverpool, L25 7TN; England; 53.372370°N 2.865594°W

Information
- Former name: Notre Dame Woolton
- Type: Voluntary aided school
- Motto: Serve the good God well with much liberty of spirit.
- Religious affiliation: Roman Catholic
- Founder: Sisters of Notre Dame de Namur
- Local authority: Liverpool City Council
- Department for Education URN: 104712 Tables
- Ofsted: Reports
- Headteacher: Kate McCourt
- Gender: Girls
- Age: 11 to 18
- Website: www.stjulies.org.uk

St Julie's Catholic High School is a Roman Catholic secondary school for girls aged 11–18 located in Woolton, Liverpool.

== History ==
The school is the amalgamation of several different institutions, most established by the Congregation of the Sisters of Notre Dame de Namur, founded by Saint Julie Billiart. The sisters were called to Liverpool in 1851 at the behest of Fr. James Nugent to help educate the poor families in the area. The sisters opened a fee-paying school at Woolton Hall in 1950. This school later became a voluntary aided Grammar School and then merged with Notre Dame Mount Pleasant High School in 1970 to form Notre Dame Woolton. In 1983, Notre Dame Woolton merged with La Sagesse, a school of the Daughters of Wisdom on Aigburth Road in Aigburth, and adopted its current name.

In 2014, there were plans to move the school to a site on Beaconsfield Road adjacent to St. Francis Xavier's College, but a revised plan was subsequently implemented to build largely on the existing site. The footprint of the new building required the use of some land from the adjacent field, which was exchanged for a much larger area of privately held historic woodland. This woodland is now accessible to all, increasing the size of Woolton Woods parkland for the benefit and enjoyment of Wooltonians. Teaching began in the new building in September 2017, and it was officially opened by Mayor Joe Anderson in September 2018.

== Notable alumnae ==
- Katherine Rose Morley (b. 1989) - actress
- Chelcee Grimes (b. 1992) - singer, songwriter, television presenter, and footballer Fulham F.C. Women
- Jodie Comer (b. 1993) - actress, Emmy awards
- Katarina Johnson-Thompson (b. 1993) - world champion athlete and Olympic Medallist

=== Notre Dame Mount Pleasant High School ===
- Judy Bennett (b. 1943) - actress, known for playing Shula in The Archers since 1971

=== La Sagesse Convent ===
- Rita Tushingham (b. 1942) - actress, known for A Taste of Honey (film)

== See also ==
List of schools in Liverpool
