= Gary Kosins =

American football player (born 1949)

No. 33
- Position: Running back

Personal information
- Born: January 21, 1949 (age 77); Warsaw, Indiana, U.S.
- Listed height: 6 ft 1 in (1.85 m)
- Listed weight: 215 lb (98 kg)

Career information
- High school: Chaminade-Julienne (Dayton, Ohio)
- College: Dayton
- NFL draft: 1972: 3rd round, 77th overall pick

Career history
- Miami Dolphins (1972)*; Chicago Bears (1972–1974)
- * Offseason or practice squad member only

Career NFL statistics
- Rushing attempts: 35
- Rushing yards: 100
- Total touchdowns: 2
- Stats at Pro Football Reference

Gary James Kosins (born January 21, 1949) is an American former professional football player who was a running back for three seasons with the Chicago Bears of the National Football League (NFL). He played college football for the Dayton Flyers and was selected by the Miami Dolphins in the third round of the 1972 NFL draft.

== Early life and college ==
Gary James Kosins was born on January 21, 1949, in Warsaw, Indiana. He attended Chaminade Julienne Catholic High School in Dayton, Ohio. He earned Class AA first-team all-state honors as a senior in 1967. He graduated from Chaminade Julienne Catholic in 1968.

He was a four-year letterman for the Dayton Flyers from 1968 to 1971. In 1969, he rushed 198 times for 783 yards and nine touchdowns while also catching nine passes for 74 yards and one touchdown. He accumulated 344 carries for 1,172 yards and 18 touchdowns, and five receptions for 58 yards in 1970. His 344 rushing attempts were the most in the country that season. Kosins rushed 237 times for 857 yards and 12 touchdowns while catching six passes for 63 yards and one touchdown his senior year in 1971. He played in the Blue–Gray Football Classic and Senior Bowl after his senior season, and was named the MVP of the former game.

== Professional career ==
Kosins was selected by the Miami Dolphins in the third round, with the 77th overall pick, of the 1972 NFL draft. He was waived on September 12, 1972.

He was claimed off waivers by the Chicago Bears on September 13, 1972. He played in all 14 games for the Bears in 1972, rushing three times for five yards, catching two passes for 15 yards and one touchdown, fumbling once, and recovering one fumble. Kosins appeared in 12 games, starting two, during the 1973 season, recording 24 carries for 65 yards and four receptions for eight yards. He played in all 14 games in 1974, totaling eight rushing attempst for 30 yards and one touchdown, and one catch for three yards. He was released by the Bears on August 5, 1975.

== See also ==
- List of NCAA major college football yearly scoring leaders
