= Notre Dame High School, Sheffield =

Notre Dame Catholic High School
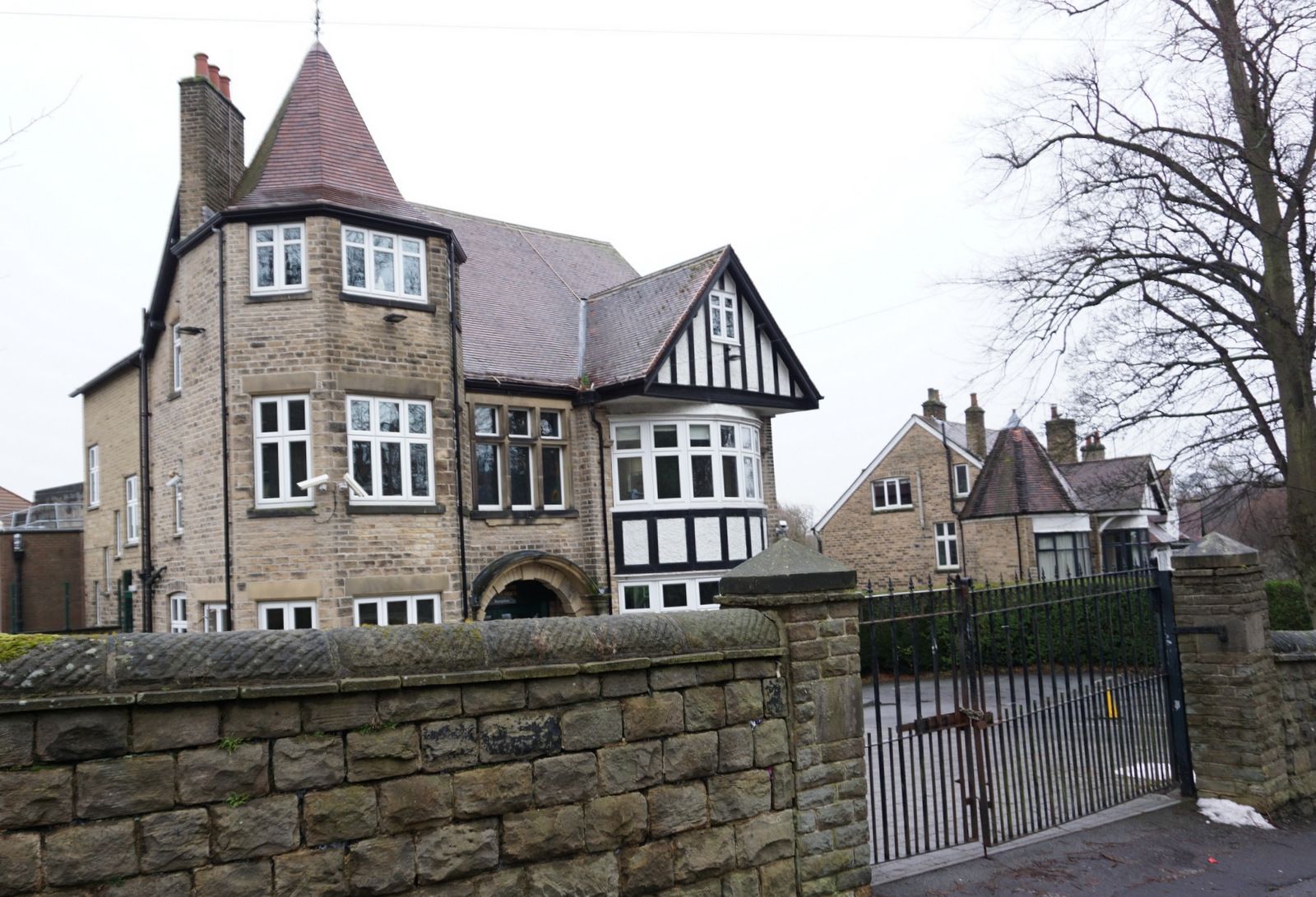

Location
- Fulwood Road; Sheffield, South Yorkshire, S10 3BT; England; 53°22′22″N 1°31′02″W

Information
- Type: Academy
- Motto: Ah! Qu'il est bon le bon dieu French: "Ah! How good is the Good God"
- Religious affiliation: Roman Catholic
- Established: 1855
- Founder: Sisters of Notre Dame
- Local authority: City of Sheffield
- Specialist: Technology College
- Department for Education URN: 138361 Tables
- Ofsted: Reports
- Headmasters: Deirdre Cleary
- Gender: Coeducational
- Age: 11 to 19
- Enrolment: 1,400 (346 in Sixth Form)
- Houses: Picardy, St Julie, compiègne, Cuvilly
- Colour: Bottle Green
- Website: www.notredame-high.co.uk

Notre Dame Catholic High School in Sheffield, South Yorkshire, England, was established in the 1850s by the Sisters of Notre Dame, a religious order. It was, for many decades, a fee paying school. It currently has 1400 students, with a 1:17 teacher-to-student ratio.

== Admissions ==
The school has a Catholic ethos and caters for children from all over the city and further afield. The school is co-educational, and has students aged 11–18.

== History ==
The sisters of Notre Dame set up the school in 1855 in central Sheffield, moving to a site on Cavendish Street in 1862.

In 1919, the Sisters moved their living quarters from Cavendish Street to Oakbrook House, a Victorian mansion in Ranmoor built in 1860 for Mark Firth, a steel manufacturer who became Lord Mayor of Sheffield and Master Cutler.

In 1935, another secondary school was built in the grounds of Oakbrook House; in 1948 the two schools amalgamated to form a girls' grammar school, Notre Dame High School for Girls, on two sites.

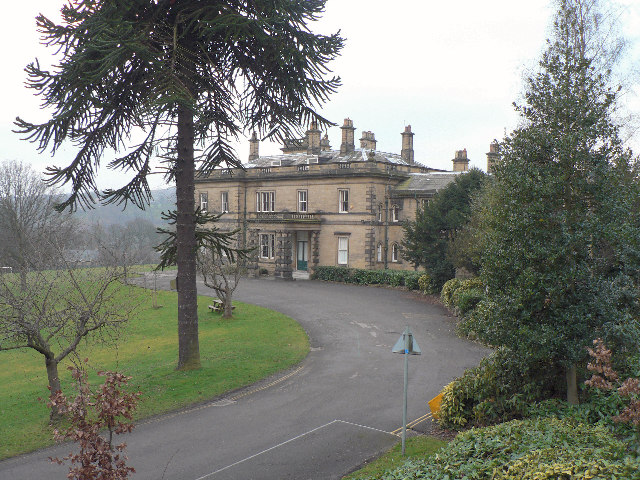
Notre Dame High School

The grammar school was converted in 1976 to a mixed comprehensive, still on two sites. The school finally consolidated onto the Oakbrook site in 1988 when the Cavendish site was closed and subsequently demolished.

Oakbrook House is now the school's Sixth Form block and has been a listed building since 1973. The main school building is a 1930s building with many architectural features including a main hall, known as the salle, with a high vaulted ceiling. As the school has expanded, other buildings have been built that complement the architecture of the site, making use of local sandstone or red pantiles depending where the building fits in. The Hallam City Learning Centre on the site has modern architectural merit and receives a mention in the Pevsner guide to the architecture of Sheffield.

The school became an academy in August 2012.

== Achievements ==
OFSTED described the school as outstanding in every way in 2005 and 2008.

=== School Specialism ===
It has been a Specialist Technology College since 1995 and was awarded a second specialism in 2005 in Humanities and a third as a Leading Edge school supporting a partnership of other schools. The Leading Edge specialism also includes a sub-specialism on sharing good practice with others around issues of educating able, gifted and talented pupils.

=== Academic ===
The GCSE (A*–C) rate in 2009 was the strongest in school's history with the 80% barrier of the number of pupils gaining 5 good GCSE being broken for the first time. The figure including English and maths was well above average for Sheffield with 70% of 5th Year (Y11) pupils attaining these grades, compared with Sheffield's average of 39.9%. It was the second highest for Sheffield in the state sector, with Silverdale School in Sheffield being the highest. In 2007, there were 280 in the sixth form, 111 of whom took A-levels, with an average point score of 84.70, compared with the average of 79.9 in England overall.

== Houses ==
The school has four houses: Picardy, Compiègne, St Julie, Cuvilly, all having roots in places associated with St Julie Billart, the founder of the Order of Notre Dame. There are two school inter-house competitions, the sports day and the house cup, with the latter measuring academic ability and effort of house. The houses are balanced equally, with two forms from each year.

== Ethos and traditions ==
The school's Catholic ethos offers many opportunities for pupils and staff to work together to prepare for pastoral occasions, for example, the whole school Mass at the end of the year, and for the 5th year leavers' mass during May.

== Alumni ==
=== Notre Dame High School for Girls ===
- Sheila Hollins, Baroness Hollins, professor of psychiatry at St George's, University of London since 1990, president of the Royal College of Psychiatrists from 2005 to 2008
- Judy Parfitt, actress

=== Notre Dame High School ===
- Joe Carnall, former lead singer of Milburn (band)
- Jackie Doyle-Price, Conservative MP for Thurrock
- Alex Kiwomya, footballer currently signed to Stafford Rangers
- Jon McClure and Ed Cosens, singer and bassist respectively with Reverend and The Makers
- Johnny Nelson, boxer
- George Hirst, footballer currently signed to Ipswich Town
- Louie Hinchliffe, sprinter
