= Warwick Medical School =

British medical school of Warwick University

Coordinates: 52.3744°N 1.5527°W

- Type: Medical school
- Established: 2000
- Parent institution: University of Warwick
- Dean: Professor Gavin Perkins
- Administrative staff: ca. 500
- Students: ca. 1900
- Location: Coventry, England
- Website: www2.warwick.ac.uk/fac/med

Warwick Medical School is the medical school of the University of Warwick and is located in Coventry, United Kingdom. It was opened in 2000 in partnership with Leicester Medical School, and was granted independent degree-awarding status in 2007.

== History ==
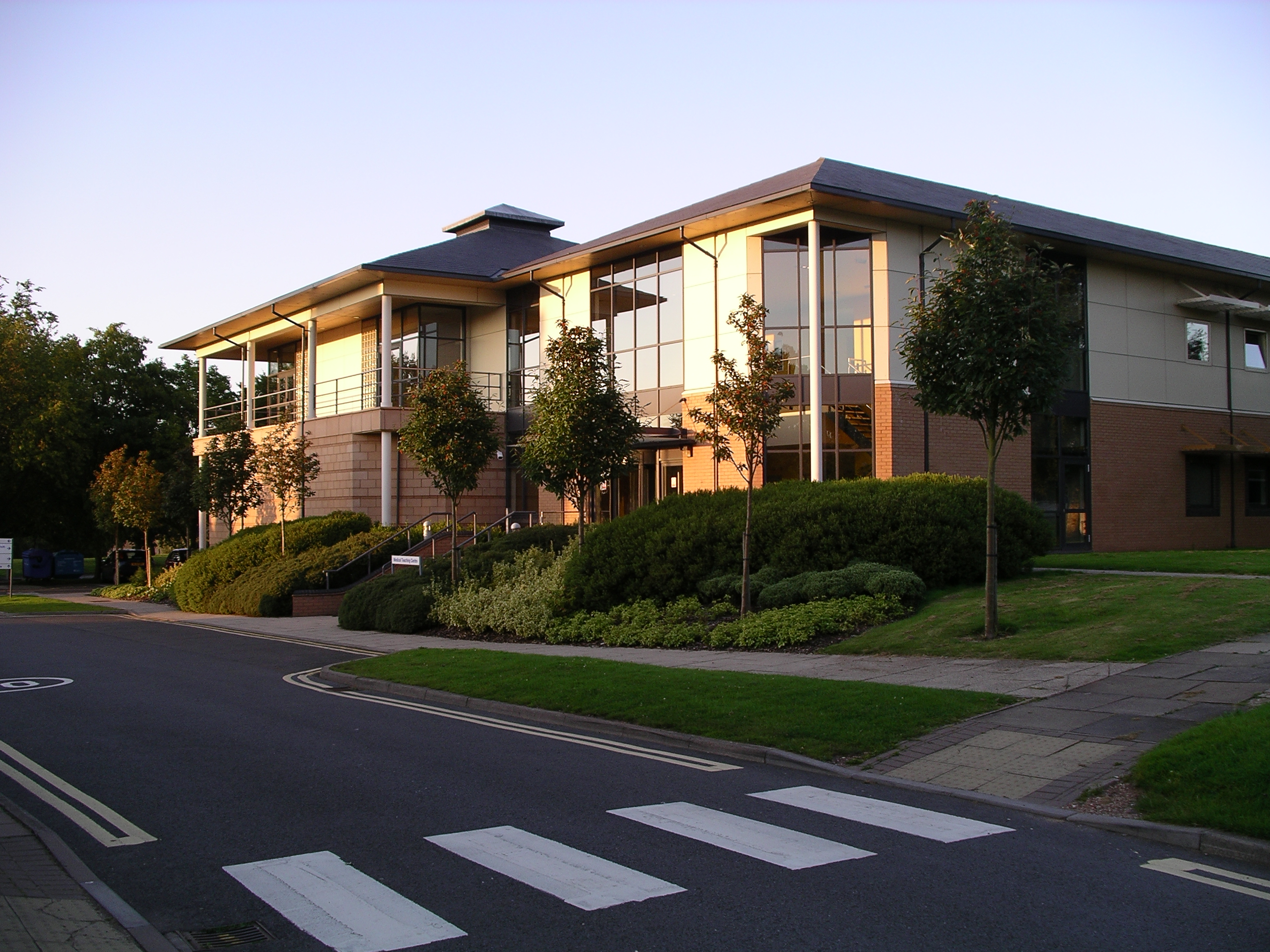
The Medical Teaching Centre

The school was established as a collaborative venture with the University of Leicester. Professor Ian Lauder was appointed Dean of the joint school. The first students to study at Warwick arrived in September 2000. The school had temporary headquarters on the main University of Warwick campus until the Medical Teaching Centre was completed in August 2001 and was formally opened by the Secretary of State for Health in 2002. In 2003 Professor Yvonne Carter was appointed as Vice-Dean, before taking on the role of Dean of Warwick Medical School the following year..

The first MBChB students graduated in 2004, the same year that the old Mathematics and Statistics building at Gibbet Hill was refurbished and renamed the Medical School Building. This building is now home to the Dean's Office, the Warwick Clinical Trials Unit and HSRI. The Clinical Sciences Research Institute was opened on the site of University Hospital Coventry and Warwickshire in 2005, by Sir Graeme Catto, President of the General Medical Council. In 2006, the school opened a Biomedical Learning Grid for students. This study resource is equipped with up-to-date IT equipment, interactive white boards, plasma screens and PCs as well as more traditional learning materials such as reference texts and anatomical models.

Following an intensive period of assessment in 2006 by the General Medical Council, Warwick was formally recommended to receive independent degree-awarding status. This was enacted on 2 May 2007 when the Medical Act was amended by The Queen in the Privy Council. Independent degree-awarding status came into effect on 6 June 2007. MBChB graduates in the summer of 2007 were the first to receive University of Warwick medical degrees.

After Professor Carter's premature death in July 2009, she was succeeded as Dean by Professor Peter Winstanley (formerly University of Liverpool). At the end of 2014, Winstanley vacated the role of Dean to take up a head of faculty role and the previous Deputy Dean, Professor Sudhesh Kumar, was appointed Acting Dean for one year in the first instance, becoming permanent Dean in 2015.

In April 2013, Warwick Medical School received an Athena SWAN Silver award for its school-wide work supporting the Charter for Women in Science. As of 2017 Warwick Medical School holds an Athena SWAN bronze award.

== Teaching ==
The Warwick MBChB

Warwick offers a four-year Bachelor of Medicine and Bachelor of Surgery (MB ChB) for graduates. Applicants must have an upper second-class degree or a lower second-class degree along with a masters at a Merit or above.

Year one is delivered through largely university-based teaching, including integrated clinical exposure in various settings. Students are allocated to small learning groups for Case-Based Learning sessions made up of around ten students of different backgrounds and experiences.

Year two gradually increases the amount of time spent learning in health care settings, so that students become immersed in community and hospital-based clinical teaching. In years three and four, the majority of learning is based in the community and in hospitals through the school's partner trusts.

The majority of the clinical placements are in three hospitals; University Hospital Coventry and Warwickshire (UHCW), Warwick Hospital and George Eliot Hospital. Placements are also provided in primary and community care settings, ranging from GP practices to outreach projects and mental health services in the local area.

The admissions procedure for the MB ChB course begins with an application through UCAS. Prospective students must also take the UK Clinical Aptitude Test (UKCAT) in the year preceding their application. A proportion of applicants are invited to a selection centre. Successful applicants are then selected based on their performance at the selection centre. From 2018 entry onwards, the MB ChB course has an intake of 193 full-time students each year.

Postgraduate taught degrees and Continuing Professional Development (CPD)

The school offers a wide range of taught postgraduate programmes and continuing professional development (CPD) courses. The majority of students study courses part-time and a key feature is the flexible approach to teaching and learning, with a range of provision including Postgraduate Awards, Postgraduate Certificates, Postgraduate Diplomas, Master's degrees and Non-accredited training. Subject areas include Dentistry, Diabetes, Public Health, Health Sciences, Advanced Clinical Practice, Advanced Critical Care Practice and Health Research. The Medical School also offers taught postgraduate programmes in Medical Education designed to provide health care professionals involved in the delivery of teaching and training in the health care environment with appropriate pedagogic skills.

Research Degrees

WMS offers a range of postgraduate research degrees. Postgraduate students can choose to study for a PhD, an MSc by Research, an MPhil or an MD (Doctor of Medicine). The school also offers the PhD by Published Work with a minimum of six months registration prior to submission.

== Research ==
Research at Warwick Medical School is configured into three divisions: Biomedical Sciences, Health Sciences and Clinical Trials.

=== Division of Biomedical Sciences ===
The work of WMS's research in Biomedical Sciences focuses on major human diseases including cancer, inflammation, neuro-degeneration and bacterial and viral infections. Research focuses on understanding at a molecular level what happens to these cells. This work is essential for developing effective therapeutic treatments.

=== Division of Health Sciences ===
Home to a range of academics, the Health Sciences division analyses social, psychological, organisational and bio-medical issues. The division's research focus is on designing and evaluating behavioural, medical, technological and organisational interventions. The aim is to improve clinical practice and ultimately health outcomes.

=== Warwick Clinical Trials Unit ===
The Warwick Clinical Trials Unit was set up in 2005 and is an academic clinical trials unit with expertise in the design and conduct of trials, particularly of complex health states and interventions. WCTU is interdisciplinary, with collaboration between clinical triallists, statisticians, economists, clinical experts and project managers. With expertise in both designing and conducting trials, WCTU specialises in trials investigating complex health states and interventions. Its programmes of work draw together quantitative and qualitative methodologies in an evaluation framework. High quality, randomised evidence is generated to inform modern clinical and health care practice.

WCTU's major strands of work are:

- Cancer
- Emergency and Critical Care
- Frailty
- Mental Health
- Musculoskeletal disorders and pain
- Trauma and Orthopaedics
- Rehabilitation
- Reproductive Health
- Clinical trials methodology

=== Research Centres ===
Spearheading research that pushes the boundaries, WMS research centres are dedicated to seeking answers and applying this knowledge to transform people's lives.

- Cancer Research Centre
- Centre for Mechanochemical Cell Biology
- Tommy's National Miscarriage Research Centre
- Warwick Centre for Applied Health Research and Delivery (WCAHRD)

== Student life ==
The medic community is brought together under the leadership of the University of Warwick Medical Society ('Warwick Medsoc') which organises social events, Medics sports (so as not to clash with their busy timetables) and the yearly Revue, the function of which is mainly to poke fun at the Medical School and the NHS.

There are a number of other Warwick Medical School societies, including:

- Street Doctors
- WMS Vipers
- WMS Anaesthetics Society
- Warwick Wilderness Medicine Society
- Teddy Bear Hospital
- Friends of MSF
- Marrow
- Pride
- Student Sems
- The Warwick Ultrasounds choir
