= D'Harscamp =

Belgian aristocratic family

The d'Harscamp were a Belgian aristocratic family from the Namur region, who were Counts of Argenteau. They became wealthy during the Thirty Years' War through possession of the secret of how to cast cannon in a single piece. They endowed many local charitable institutions and a main street of Namur is named after them.

== Family members ==
Jeanne d'Harscamp, Dowager Duchess of Beaufort-Spontin, hosted Louis XIV of France at her chateau at Freÿr, when the Treaty of Freÿr was signed.

Charles-Francois de Paule, Baron d'Harscamp (1669-1736) was Mayor of Namur and then Lieutenant Governor from 1732 to his death. In 1711 he married Marie Isabelle, Comtesse d'Argenteau. They had five children:

- Charles-Antoine, lieutenant mayor of Namur;
- Marie-Thérèse-Isabelle, (1712-1782), who married Baron Heinrich von Blumenthal and as Baroness von Blumenthal was head of the household of Princess Heinrich of Prussia. A sculpture of her by Jean-Pierre-Antoine Tassaert was destroyed by allied bombing.
- Charles-Joseph, who was killed at war;
- Henri, who was also killed at war;
- François-Pontian, who married Isabelle Brunelle (1724-1805), a noted philanthropist, whose statue is to be seen in Namur.
