= Cuvilly =

- Commune
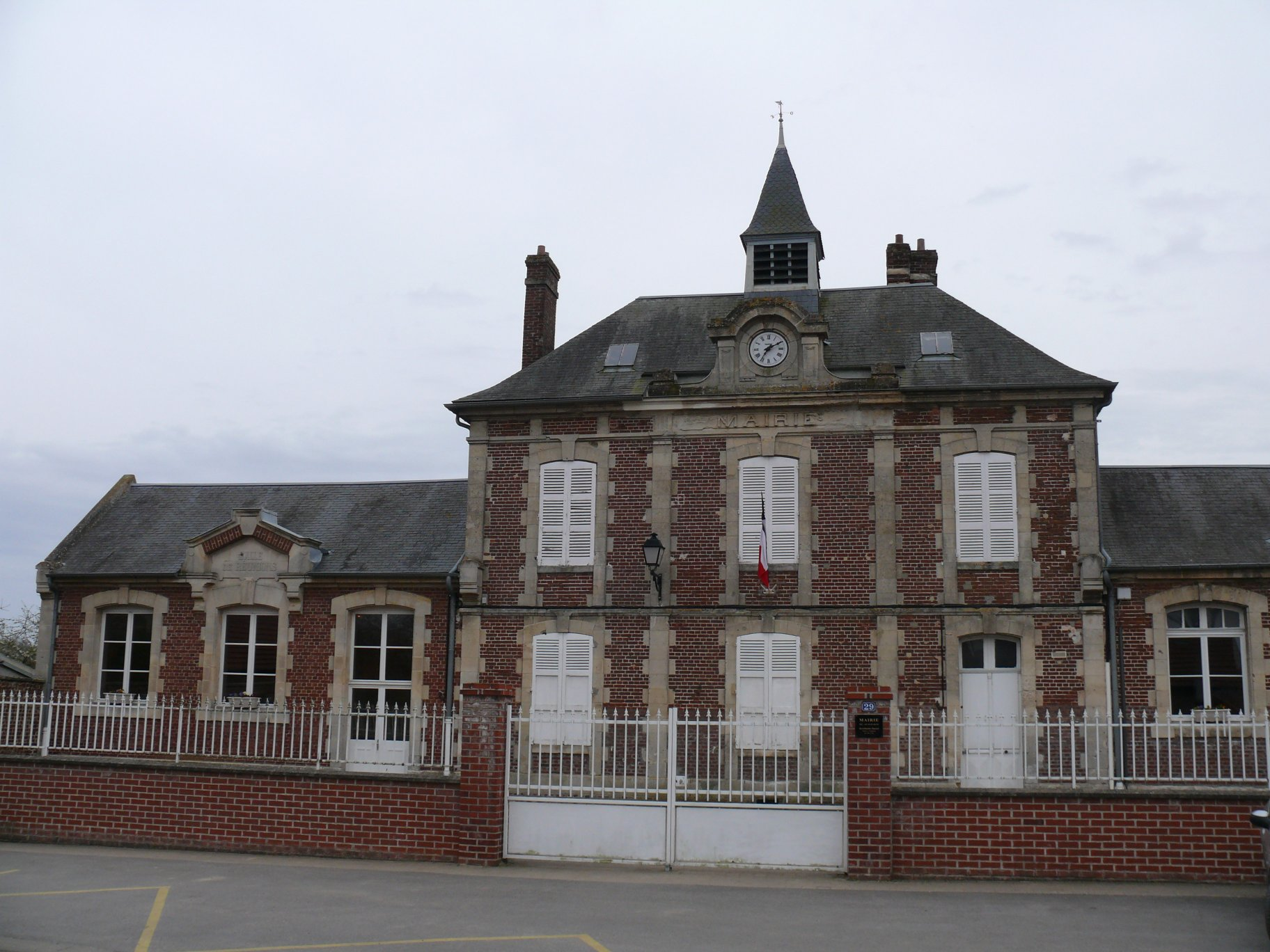
- The town hall in Cuvilly
- Location of Cuvilly
- Location within France Location within Hauts-de-France
- Coordinates: 49°33′15″N 2°41′46″E
- Country: France
- Region: Hauts-de-France
- Department: Oise
- Arrondissement: Compiègne
- Canton: Estrées-Saint-Denis
- Intercommunality: Pays des Sources

Government
  - Mayor (2020–2026): Franck Odermatt
- Area^{1}: 8.61 km^{2} (3.32 sq mi)
- Elevation: 72 m (236 ft)
- Highest elevation: 129 m (423 ft)
- Lowest elevation: 65 m (213 ft)
- Population (2023): 620
  - Density: 72/km^{2} (190/sq mi)
- Time zone: UTC+01:00 (CET)
  - Summer (DST): UTC+02:00 (CEST)
- INSEE/Postal code: 60191 /60490
- ^{1} French Land Register data, which excludes lakes, ponds, glaciers > 1 km^{2} (0.386 sq mi or 247 acres) and river estuaries.

Cuvilly (French pronunciation: [kyviji]) is a commune in the Oise department in northern France.

== See also ==
- Communes of the Oise department
