= Julie Billiart =

French nun and Catholic saint

Saint Julie Billiart SNDdeN
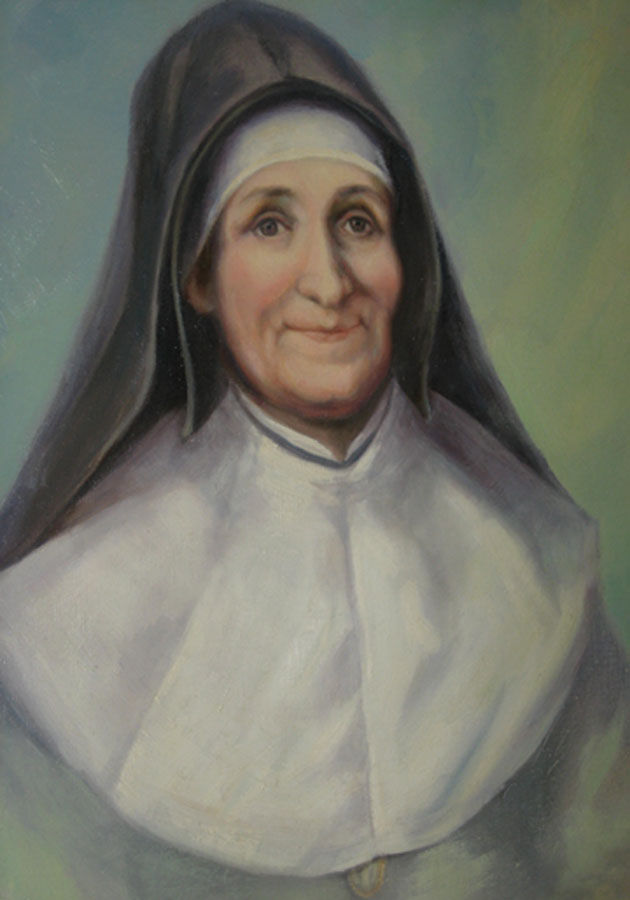
- Saint Julie Billiart painted in 1830, by an unknown artist
- Born: 12 July 1751; Cuvilly, Picardy, France
- Died: 8 April 1816 (aged 64); Namur, Belgium
- Venerated in: Roman Catholic Church
- Beatified: 13 May 1906 by Pope Pius X
- Canonized: 22 June 1969 by Pope Paul VI
- Feast: 8 April
- Patronage: educators, teachers

Julie Billiart, SNDdeN (12 July 1751 – 8 April 1816) was a French Catholic nun, educator, and cofounder of the Sisters of Notre Dame de Namur.

She was born in Cuvilly, a village in Picardy, in northern France. She was paralyzed and bedridden for 22 years, but was well known for her prayer, her embroidery skills, and her education of both the poor and the nobility, especially her work with young girls. She had to flee Cuvilly after the start of the French Revolution and escaped to Compiègne, where the stress she experienced resulted in another illness that took away her ability to speak, and where she received a vision foretelling that she would found a new religious congregation that would eventually become the Sisters of Notre Dame de Namur. In 1794, she met the French noblewoman and nun, Françoise Blin de Bourdon, who became Billiart's co-founder and close associate, in Amiens.

In 1804, Billiart and de Bourdon established the Sisters of Notre Dame in Amiens, where they and other nuns dedicated themselves to the care and education of young girls. Billiart, who was called "Mother Julie", was healed of both her paralysis and her speech and went on to found schools and homes for poor girls in France and Belgium. As of 2020, the Sisters of Notre Dame de Namur worked in 16 countries on five continents. Billiart died on 8 April 1816 in Namur. She was beatified on 13 May 1906 by Pope Pius X and canonized on 22 June 1969 by Pope Paul VI.

== Early life ==
Julie Billiart was born on 12 July 1751, in Cuvilly, a village in Picardy, in northern France, to farmer and shop owner Jean-François Billiart and Marie-Louise-Antoinette Debraine, who were "strong Christian parents". Billiart's childhood was "remarkable"; she knew the catechism by heart by the age of seven, when she began teaching it to her friends. She received a rudimentary education at the village school run by her uncle and received her First Communion, was confirmed, and took a vow of chastity when she was nine years old. She knew that she wanted to enter the religious life by the time she was 14. Billiart was admired for her "beautiful embroidery and lace", which she sold in her family's store and donated to local churches and to the nearby Carmelite convent. When she was 16, "[m]isfortunes overtook the Billiart family"; their store was robbed and they were never able to recover financially. She found work as a farm worker and would teach her co-workers hymns, lecture about faith and virtue, and share Bible stories. She was "held in such high esteem for her virtue and piety as to be commonly called, 'the saint of Cuvilly'".

In 1774, Billiart witnessed the shooting of her father as they worked in the family store; the traumatic experience resulted in a "mysterious illness". She became paralyzed and by 1784, due to poor medical treatment, was confined to her bed as "a helpless cripple" for 22 years. Despite being bedridden, she "exercised an uncommon gift of prayer", spending four or five hours a day "in contemplation" and received the Eucharist daily. She also spent her time making linens and laces for the altar, teaching both poor peasants from Cuvilly and noblewomen from Picardy, and preparing village children for their First Communion.

== Life and work ==
In 1789, the French Revolution broke out; Billiart, as Loyola Press put it, "conducted her defiance from her bed", helped protect a non-juried priest, and refused to cooperate with a priest loyal to the Revolutionary government and persuaded the entire village to boycott him, so with the help of one of her noblewomen students, she was forced to escape Cuvilly. She had to hide from revolutionaries by hiding under a mound of straw in the bed of a wagon; a farmhand helped Billiart, her niece, and caregiver escape to Compiègne. The stress of being so far away from home, the worry for her friends who risked their safety to protect her, and the grief over the loss of her father and her friends, the Martyrs of Compiègne, sixteen Carmelite sisters who were guillotined in 1794, resulted in another paralysis that took away her ability to speak. While in Compiègne, she received a vision about founding a new religious congregation, hearing the words, "These are the daughters that I will give you in an Institute, which will be marked by my cross", which she believed was a "guide for her future".

In October 1794, she moved to a small apartment in Amiens, where she met the French noblewoman and nun, Françoise Blin de Bourdon, whom Billiart recognized as one of the nuns in her vision in Compiègne. At first, de Bourdon was "repelled by Julie's disabilities and her garbled speech", but Billiart "immediately admired and enjoyed Francoise, who came with a character that was genuine, spiritual and strong". Eventually, Billiart and de Bourdon became close and de Bourdon slowly came to "love and admire the invalid for her wonderful gifts of soul" and her "deep faith and loving spirit". Billiart and de Bourdon's friendship was strengthened between 1795 and 1797, through their correspondence while de Bourdon cared for her family in Gézaincourt in northern France.

In 1797, during the Reign of Terror, Billiart, de Bourdon, and the Abbé Thomas, who was also hiding and ministering in Amiens, escaped to Bettencourt in northern France until they were able to return to Amiens in February 1803. They met Father Varin, a local priest, in Bettencourt and Billiart continued teaching girls. When they returned to Amiens, Varin entrusted the care of some young orphan girls to Billiart and de Bourdon. On February 2, 1804, Billiart, de Bourdon, and another woman, Catherine Duchâtel, made vows of chastity, dedicated themselves to the care and education of young girls, and founded the Sisters of Notre Dame in Amiens, which later became the Sisters of Notre Dame de Namur. Billiart regained the ability to speak with Varin's assistance.

A small group of de Bourdon's associates, who were "young and high-born ladies", formed around Billiart, who taught them "how to lead the interior life" while they worked generously for "the cause of God and His poor". De Bourdon rented a home for them, where they lived, prayed, and worked together in a small community; Varin helped write formal guidelines for them. The foundation was made for what would, under the auspices of the Bishop of Amiens, become the Sisters of Notre Dame, a "society which had for its primary object the salvation of poor children" and was devoted to educating young girls and to "making known God's goodness". By February 1804, Billiart was being called "Mother Julie". Several young people volunteered to assist Billiart and de Bourdon; their first class consisted of eight orphans.

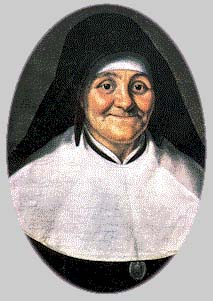
Miniature of Billiart, possibly made shortly before her death in 1816.

On June 1, 1804, on the Feast of the Sacred Heart, after her confessor instructed her to pray a novena, she was cured of paralysis. After her cure, she was able to travel to St. Valery-sur-Somme and Abbeville "on a successful mission". "The first vows of religion" were made on October 25, 1805, by Billiart, de Bourdon, and two other sisters. According to the Catholic Encyclopedia, the sisters "proposed for their lifework the Christian education of girls, and the training of religious teachers who should go wherever their services were asked for". As its founder and first superior, Billiart established the order's devotions from its very beginning. Also according to the Catholic Encyclopedia, she did away with "the time-honored distinction between choir sisters and lay sisters, but this perfect equality of rank did not in any way prevent her from putting each sister to the work for which her capacity and education fitted her". She also emphasized the spiritual formation and education of the sisters who taught in their schools and was "ably assisted" by de Bourdon, who was called "Sister St. Joseph".

On February 2, 1806, Billart had another vision, when she saw the Sisters of Notre Dame "as a 'light of revelation' " throughout the world. The religious authorities in Amiens opposed the congregation's work in other places, so they moved the congregation to Namur in 1809 and they became known as the Sisters of Notre Dame de Namur. Billart viewed universal education as "a basic human right, and teaching as the 'greatest work on earth'". As writer Anne Stevenson states, Billiart "brought the good news and hope in the goodness of God to a depressed and deprived generation by preparing vulnerable children for their duties in life, when children cried out for survival". As of 2020, the Sisters of Notre Dame de Namur worked in 16 countries on five continents.

By the time the Sisters of Notre Dame de Namur was approved by an imperial decree on June 19, 1806, it had 30 members. In a few years, the order was founded in various towns in France and Belgium, the most important ones in Ghent and Namur, where de Bourdon was the first superior. In 1809, the Namur convent became the order's motherhouse, where it remained so as of 1913. Between 1804 and 1816, Billiart founded 15 convents, made 120 "long and toilsome" journeys, and "carried on a close correspondence with her spiritual daughters", hundreds of which were preserved in Namur. In January 1816, Billiart became ill, "and after three months of pain borne in silence and patience, she died with the Magnificat on her lips". She died on April 8, 1816, in Namur.

== Legacy ==
St. Julie's predominating trait in the spiritual order was her ardent charity, springing from a lively faith and manifesting itself in her thirst for suffering and her zeal for souls. Her whole soul was echoed in the simple and naive formula which was continually on her lips and pen: "Oh, qu'il est bon, le bon Dieu" ("How good the good God is").

— The Catholic Encyclopedia, 1913

Billiart's beatification process began in 1881 and was completed on 13 May 1906 by Pope Pius X. Her story "resided in obscurity" for decades.

The first miracle that supported Billiart's rise to sainthood occurred on 20 November 1919, in Namur, when a man named Homer Rhodius was healed of renal disease after prayers to Billiart and the use of a relic, provided by his daughter and a nun of the Namur branch of the Sisters of Notre Dame, Sister Marie-Ludovica. The cause for Billiart's canonization was formally opened on 23 July 1924.

As briefly reported by Sister Mary Ludvine in the Sisters of Notre Dame of Coesfeld 1952 newsletter, on 30 September 1950, in Mata Virgem, a village in southern Brazil 27 miles from Campos Novos, a 29-year old farmer named Otacilio Ribeiro da Silva was healed of an inoperable tumor by Billiart after the prayers and use of Billiart's relic and picture by members of the congregation who also worked at the hospital where da Silva was brought and by Ludvine, who was the hospital's superior. In 1952, Mary Verona, an assistant mother general of the Coesfeld Sisters of Notre Dame, who was residing in Rome, was "well connected with the Church hierarchy", and involved in the decades-long effort to canonize Billiart, read the account of the da Silva miracle in her congregation's newsletter. This was the second miracle required for canonization, which was stalled for decades after the 1919 miracle. Four years later, in 1958, the da Silva miracle was authenticated. The 1919 miracle had to be re-examined in 1967, but Billiart was finally canonized by Pope Paul VI on 22 June 1969. Da Silva attended the ceremony and was accompanied by his 14-year old daughter, whom Da Silva named Julie, after Billiart, as he promised the nuns who prayed to Billart for his healing in 1952.

Billiart's feast day is April 8. She is the patroness saint of educators and teachers.
