= Little Aston Hall =

Country house in Staffordshire, England

Coordinates: 52.6015°N 1.8723°W

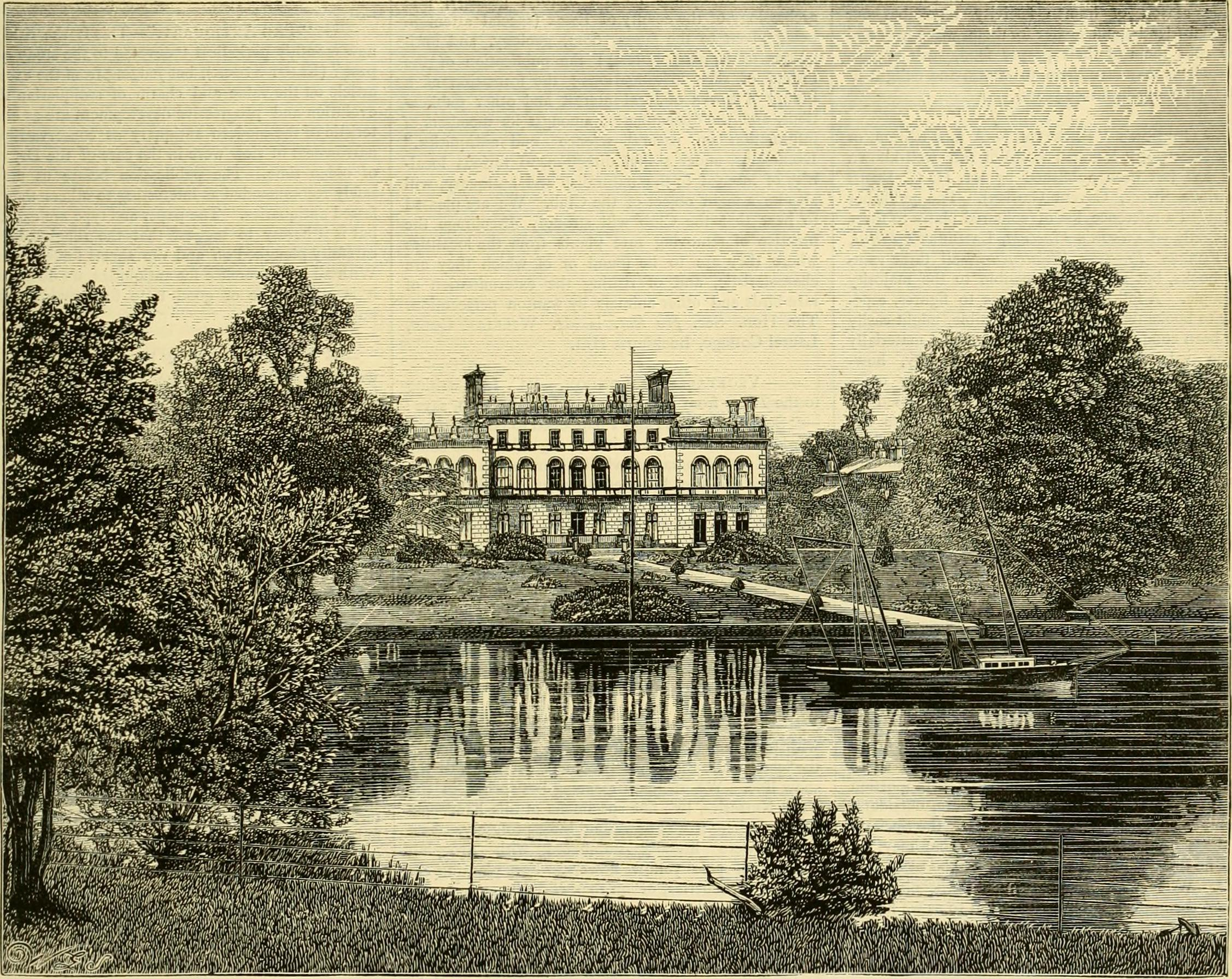
Illustration in The Gardeners' Chronicle, 1874

Little Aston Hall is a Georgian country house in Little Aston, in the Lichfield District of Staffordshire, England.

The original hall building is Grade II listed. It was constructed around 1730 by Richard Scott of nearby Great Barr Hall, in a Georgian style with a park and lake. The house was restyled by architect James Wyatt for William Tennant in the early 19th century. It was enlarged and improved at a reputed cost of £35,000 in 1857 by Hon Edward Swynfen Parker Jervis, younger son of Edward Jervis Jervis, 2nd Viscount St Vincent and great nephew of Admiral of the Fleet John Jervis, 1st Earl of St Vincent, the naval hero of the 1797 Battle of Cape St Vincent.

In the early 20th century the hall had a number of owners. The Birmingham solicitor Joseph Bennett Clarke purchased Little Aston Hall with 1500 surrounding acres in 1907, though he kept only 100 acres of the estate for gardens, a deer park, and Barns Farm. The rest was sold, and 400 acres were transformed into Little Aston Golf Course. 16 houses were built on the former estate. Clarke died in 1924 and the hall was sold to Harry Scribbans, a wealthy cake maker, with only 118 acres (0.48 km^{2}). The remaining land was sold at auction piecemeal. Unoccupied from 1950, the house became the Midlands regional headquarters of Esso in 1954, later the Head Office of Birfield Ltd. In 1966 it was acquired by GKN.

In 1984 the site was redeveloped. The original hall was converted into seven superior residential apartments, whilst retaining its external appearance. In addition seven new modern style double blocks each of six apartments were built in the grounds overlooking the lake, giving 49 apartments, most occupied by retirees. Further development of eight large detached houses known as Lakeside occurred alongside the apartments. In the 2000s around 100 apartments known as Lady Aston Park exclusively for the over 55s were built. A BUPA residential care home and private BUPA hospital followed.

== History ==
Richard Scott (1672-1734) built Little Aston Hall in 1730. He was a descendent of the Scotts from Great Barr Hall. In 1712 he married Ann Addyes (1689-1754) daughter of John Addyes of Moor Hall. The couple had one daughter, Mary who in 1734 married Andrew Hacket of Moxhull Hall. When Richard died in 1734 the property was left to his daughter Mary and therefore came into the possession of the Hacket family.

Andrew Hacket rented the house to various tenants. In 1865 it was let to Humphrey Minchin who in the same year bought Holywell House near Soberton in Hampshire. Minchin extended his Soberton house and a few years later moved there to live. Little Aston Hall by 1770 was owned by William Tennant. He at first bought the lease from Humphrey Minchin and then purchased the freehold from the Hacket family. The Tennant family had three owners over the next fifty years and all three were called William.

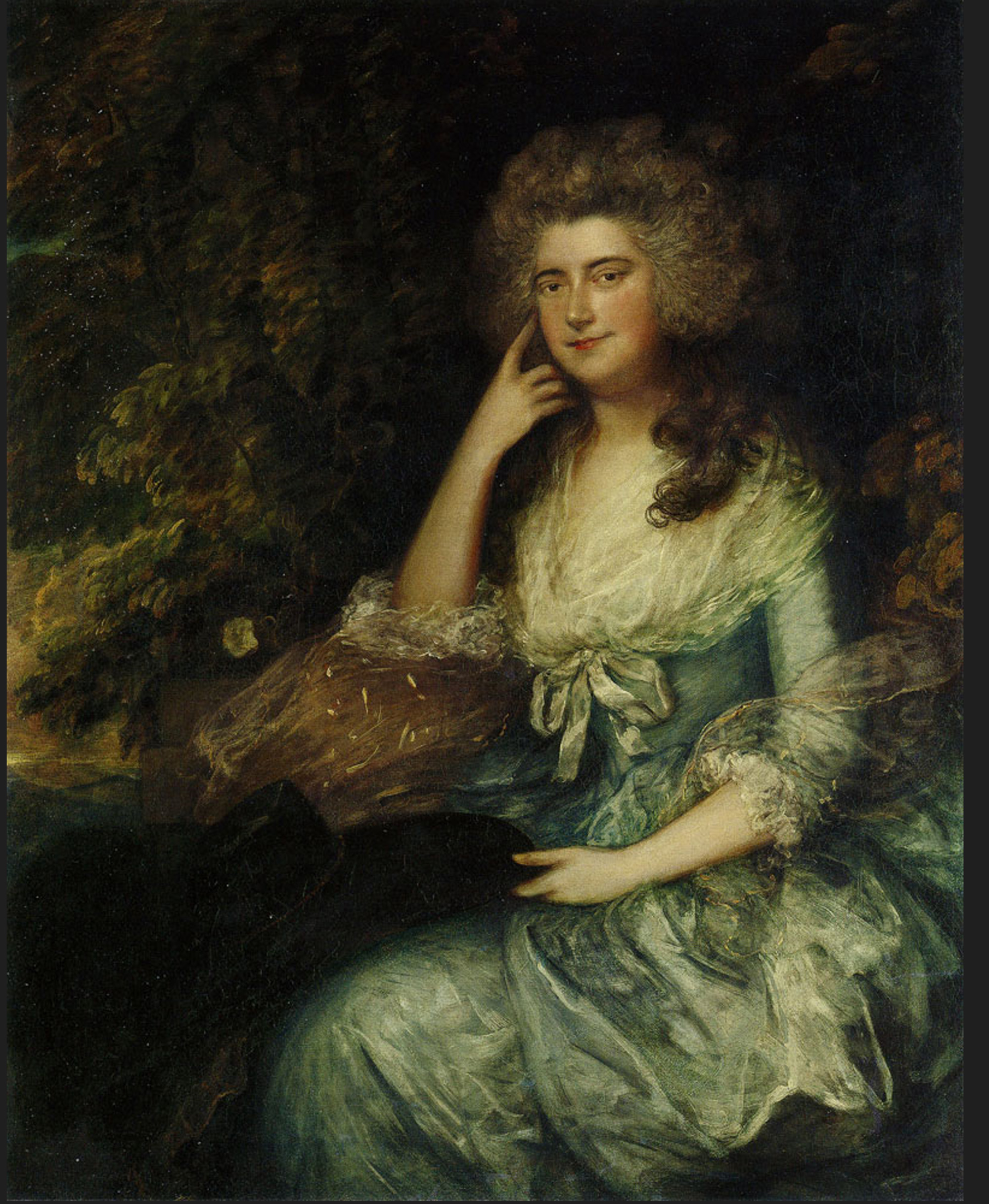
Painting of Mrs Mary Tennant by Thomas Gainsborough

William Tennant (1713-1785) who bought the hall inherited a fortune from his brother Timothy who died in 1746. In 1747 he married Sarah Chase (1719-1761) the daughter of Thomas Chase of Bromley Hall, Kent. The couple were painted by the artist Arthur Devis and their portrait can be seen at this reference. When he died in 1785 the hall was inherited by his son who was also called William Tennant.

William Tennant (1753-1803) married Mary Wylde (1751-1798) in 1777. She was the subject of a Thomas Gainsborough painting in about 1785. William was also painted by Gainsborough when he was a major in the Staffordshire militia. Mary was the daughter of Reverend John Wylde of Belbroughton. The couple had one son. In about 1790 William commissioned the famous architect James Wyatt to make substantial alterations and additions to the existing house. When William died in 1803 his son William inherited the property.

William Tennant (1783-1835) married in 1804 the Hon Maria Charlotte Anderson Pelham (1780-1840) who was the daughter of Charles 1st Lord Yarborough. In 1828 the house was put on the market for sale. The advertisement is shown. It was bought by William Leigh.

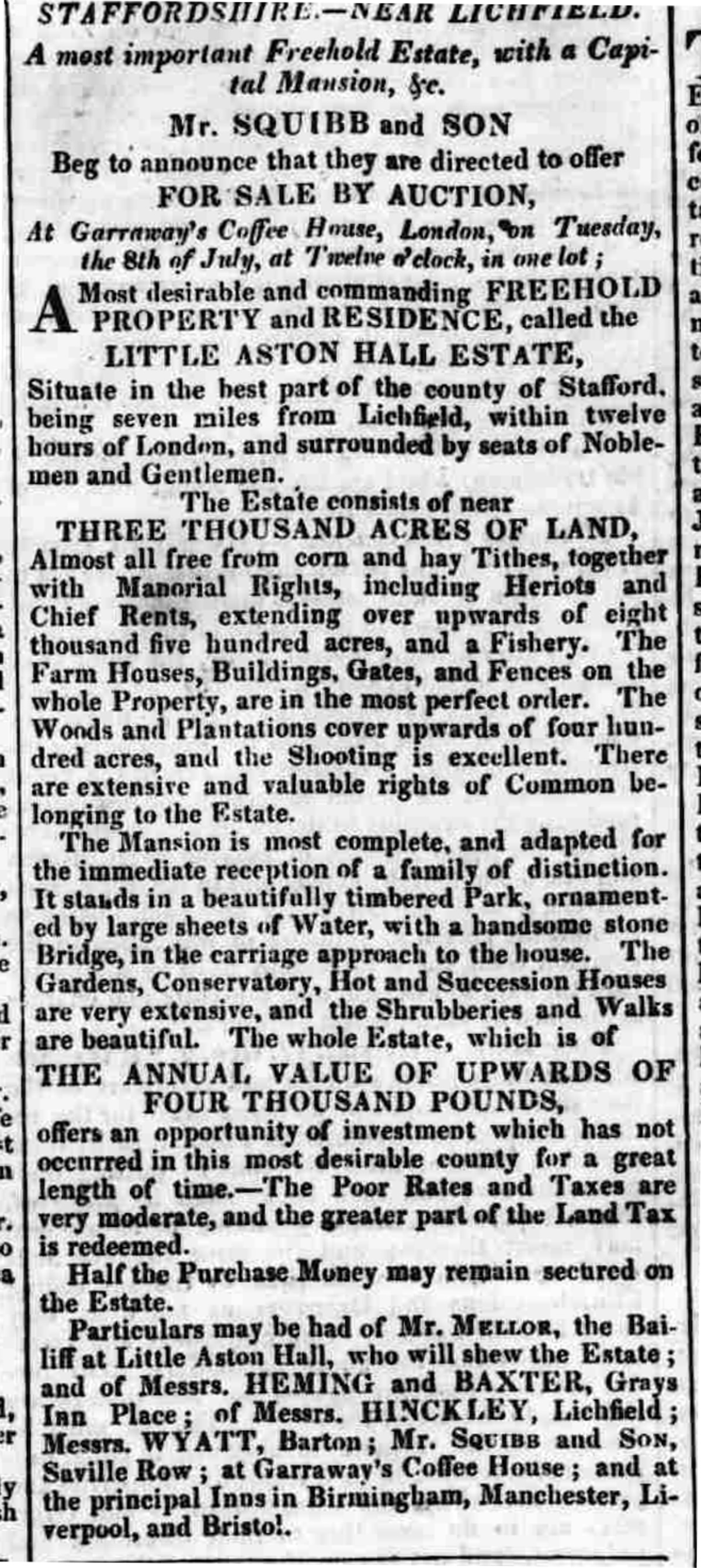
Sale notice for Little Aston Hall in 1828

William Leigh (1802-1873) was the son of a wealthy Liverpool merchant and landowner who left William a large fortune when he died in 1815. In 1828 William married Caroline Cotterell (1807-1878) who was the daughter of Sir John Cotterell, 1st Baronet. The couple had four children. He was very religious and donated large sums of money to churches particularly to those in Adelaide, South Australia. In about 1844 the Leigh family moved to Woodchester, Gloucestershire where they built a large house which is now called Woodchester Mansion. The estate was bought by Lord St Vincent in 1839. Little Aston Hall became the property of Edward Swynfen Parker Jervis.

Edward Swynfen Parker Jervis (1815-1896) was the younger son of Edward Jervis Jervis, 2nd Viscount St Vincent who bought the hall for him. Parker Jervis made major alterations and additions to the house in 1857. The architect was Edward John Payne. A detailed description was given in the “Building News and Engineering Journal” of that time which can be read at this reference.

He married twice. His first wife who he married in 1838 was Mary Barker (1818-1884), the daughter of Joseph Barker. His second wife who he married in 1886 was Maude Mainwaring (1849-1924), the daughter of Reverend Charles Henry Mainwaring. He had ten children with his first wife but many of them predeceased him. Between 1879 and 1901 he leased the house to several doctors who established a sanatorium. By 1907 it was sold to Joseph Bennett Clarke (1845-1924) who was an eminent Birmingham solicitor. He died in 1924 and it was sold to John Henry Scribbans.

John Henry (Harry) Scribbans (1877-1935) was a multimillionaire. He started life in fairly poor circumstances helping his father in the family bakery. He and his brother Thomas later opened their own business making cake and bread. It was during World War I that they became very wealthy selling large quantities of slab cake to the Government for the troops.

In 1901 he married Ada Lizzie Allen (1878-1952). The couple had five children. When he died in 1935 he left over 2.5 million pounds to his family. His will stated that Ada was only to receive her income as long as she remained a widow. If she remarried she would lose her inheritance and it would be transferred to their children. She continued to live at Little Aston Hall until 1942 when she met Lieutenant Colonel Thomas South (1880-1964). She married him in 1945 and her loss of inheritance was widely reported in the newspapers including the international press. The couple lived at Little Aston Hall for several years and then moved to their own house in Four Oaks, Sutton Coldfield. Ada was interviewed in 1949 and said that she renounced the inheritance for the sake of the “man she loved” but since then “her children – two daughters and a son – have told her they will not take the income from her.” In 1954 the Hall was sold to Esso Petroleum Company.
