= Little Aston =

Village in Staffordshire, England

Coordinates: 52.5997°N 1.8564°W

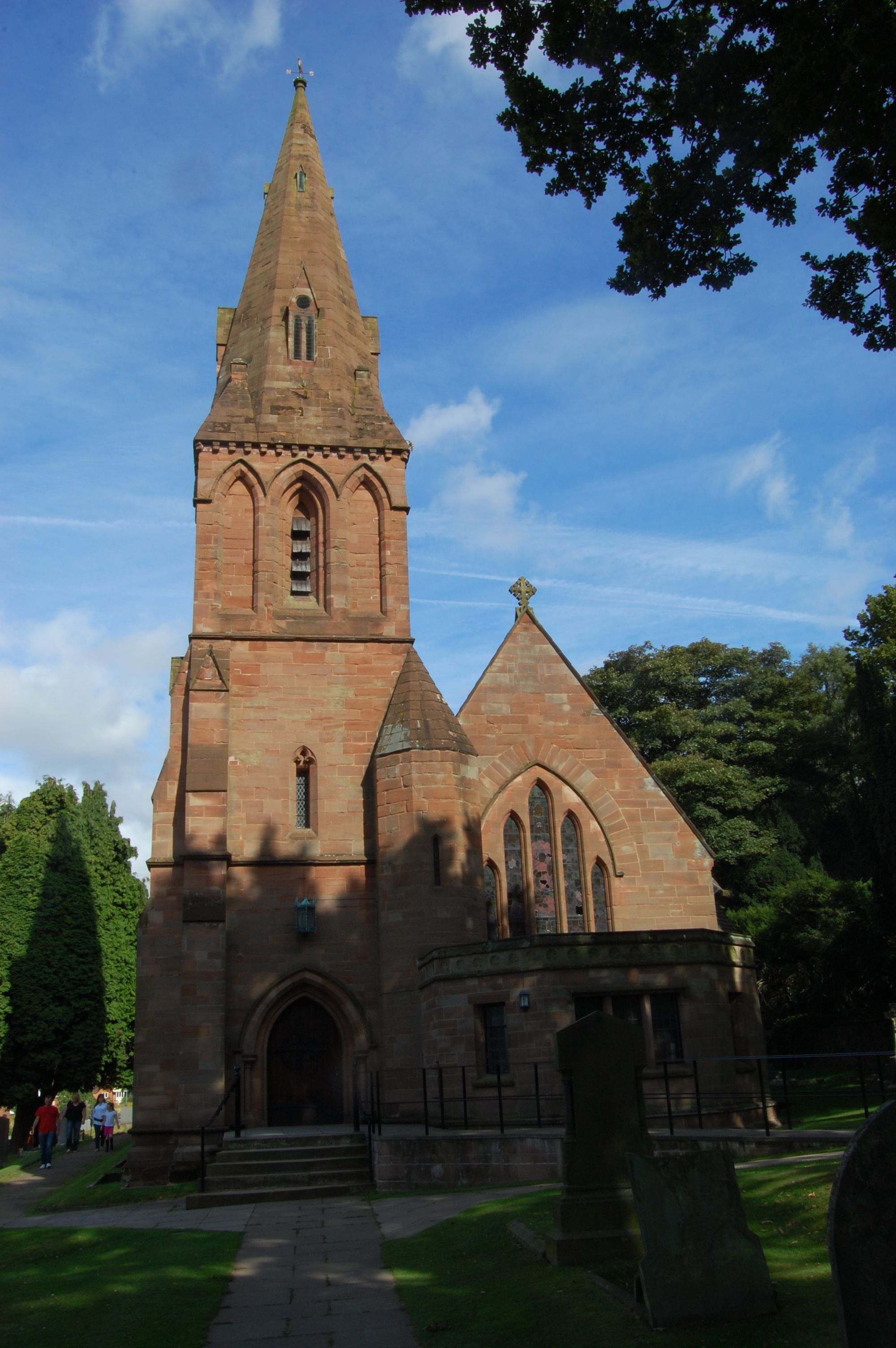
- St Peter's Church, Little Aston's parish church

- Location within Staffordshire
- Civil parish: Shenstone
- District: Lichfield
- Shire county: Staffordshire
- Region: West Midlands
- Country: England
- Sovereign state: United Kingdom
- Post town: Sutton Coldfield
- Postcode district: B74
- Post town: Walsall
- Postcode district: WS9
- Dialling code: 0121
- Police: Staffordshire
- Fire: Staffordshire
- Ambulance: West Midlands
- UK Parliament: Tamworth

Little Aston is a village in the Lichfield District of Staffordshire, England. It is 5 miles (8 km) south of the city of Lichfield. It is contiguous with Sutton Coldfield and Streetly. At the 2011 United Kingdom census the population of Little Aston ward was 2,920 people living in 1,104 households. Little Aston is also in the parish of Shenstone.

== Location and boundaries ==
Little Aston is located in the southeast of Staffordshire.

Little Aston is contained within four corners, formed by local landmarks: Blake Street Station rail bridge in the east, by Little Aston Golf Club's grounds to the west, the Little Aston Severn Trent sewage treatment works to the north and the Rosemary Hill Road/Thornhill Road traffic island in the south.

At the south is the Sutton Park, with over 2,400 acres (970 ha) of wild grasslands, forested areas, lakes and wild ponies, all accessible though the bordering Streetly Gate. In the north is the Little Aston Recreation Ground, winner of the 2015 Most Improved Fields in Trust Award. This community funded 7.5-acre (3.0 ha) play field with over 3000 trees serves as a community hub with annual events.

== Residences ==
Little Aston's small community is divided between nine main areas: Little Aston Park, Claverdon Park, Rosemary Hill Road, Little Aston Lane, Forge Lane, Walsall Road, Aldridge Road, Little Aston Hall and Lady Aston Park.

=== Little Aston Park ===
Located in the south of the village is Little Aston Park. Often referred to as "Millionaire's Row" - with Roman Road being the most expensive street in Staffordshire - it is a privately maintained estate, consisting of around 300 unique, architect-designed houses and includes Birmingham's most expensive house to be marketed at £7.5 million. It also contains one of the village's championship golf clubs, Little Aston Golf Club, and St.Peter's Church. The park is located in a woodland setting around the historic rhododendron-lined Roman Road which closely follows path of the ancient Roman Icknield Street.

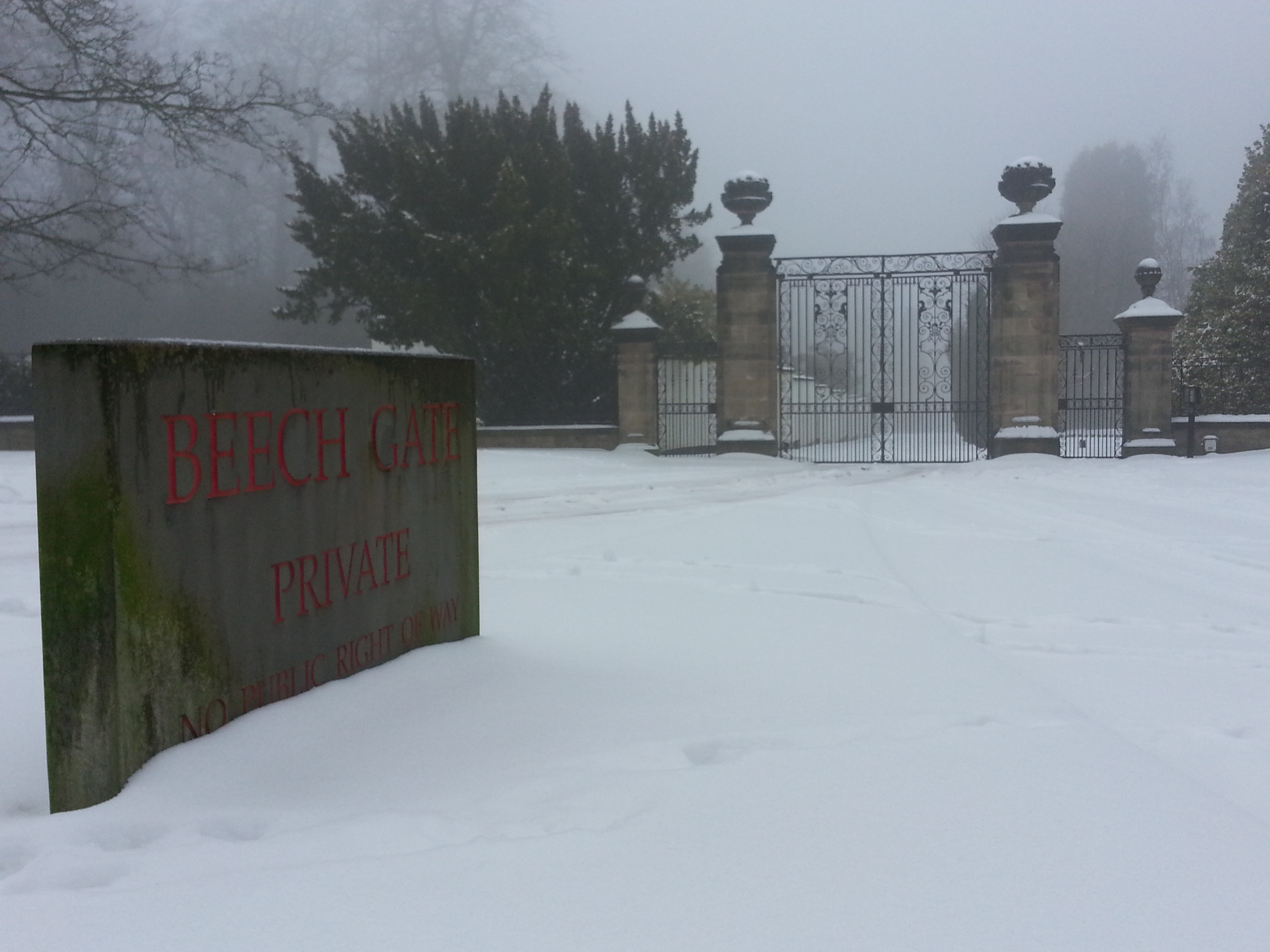
Grade II listed electric automated gates

=== Claverdon Park ===
Claverdon Park is a private estate consisting of 82 large detached houses and bungalows. Most of the estate is accessible only through the private Roman Road and gate network.

Whilst separate and distinct, this estate is still part of the Little Aston Park and is often confused as being a separate part of the Little Aston Park. It is in fact a separate entity managed by Claverdon Park Management Company Limited. Unlike most of the properties on Little Aston Park, all properties on this part of the estate have restrictive covenants that are upheld by Claverdon Park Management Company Ltd. The standards of development and the general street scene aspects are maintained by the Board of Directors of the company in addition to the regulations set by the local Council.

Roads within Claverdon Park are: Parts of Roman Lane, Barns Croft, Alderhithe Grove, Vercourt and Fallow Field.

=== Rosemary Hill Road ===
Rosemary Hill Road is a public road with many private gated driveways leading off the highway and gated houses alongside, particularly on the more exclusive Lichfield District side which borders the Little Aston Park. The west side of road is part of Little Aston (Lichfield) and the east side is in Four Oaks (Birmingham).

=== Little Aston Lane ===
At the heart of the village is Little Aston Lane (A4026). Running opposite expanses of fields and the grounds of Aston Wood golf course, the lane consists of around 50 large, detached houses. A recently constructed, landscaped recreation area also runs parallel to the lane, managed by the Little Aston Recreational Ground Association.

In addition to the lane's own housing, it also contains the entrance to The Grove. A cul-de-sac within Little Aston Lane, The Grove contains 51 large, detached homes, similar to those on the lane itself.

The Little Aston Village Hall, is also on the lane, providing services and facilities to the small community. A crown green bowling club and a tennis club are on the Hall site.

Many residents have complained to the local MP and county council regarding excessive use of the village roads by HGV tippers and artics, exposing young children walking to school to great risk. There is a bizarre situation where there is a 7.5-tonne weight limit in one direction of the road, but not in the other, and Staffordshire County Council's explanation that imposing the limit in both directions would burden the neighbouring Birmingham Council's road network with excessive traffic.

=== Forge Lane ===
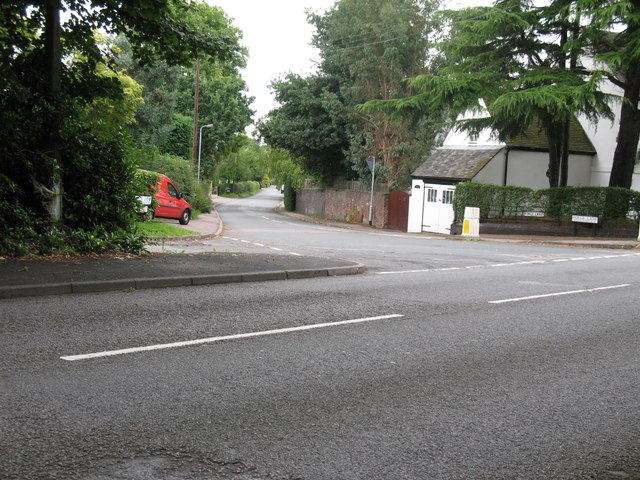
Forge Lane

Running out of the Little Aston Park and into the surrounding countryside is Forge Lane. It is lined by around 40 detached and semi-detached houses, situated on both sides of the road. The village's Little Aston Primary School is located on the lane. Forge lane also contains the entrance to Little Aston's recreation site, a large area of landscaped grassland, popular for dog walking and sports activities. In addition to this, the entrance to Little Aston's vicarage is also in the lane, which has been the home of many of the village's vicars.

Forge Lane is a continuation of Roman Road which is directly opposite across Little Aston Road. Roman Road is the old Roman, Ryknild Street part of which can be seen within the confines of Sutton Park which is at the opposite end of Roman Road from Little Aston Village by Rosemary Hill Road. The lane derives its name from the forge mill and adjacent cottages which stood over bourne / footherley brook which can be found further down the lane from the village. The mill and cottages were built around the mid-1600s by Thomas Foley whose name was used for the Foley Public House in Streetly. The mill was initially a hammer mill for iron smelting and ingot production, as the surrounding area has deposits of iron stone which were used in the mill. The mill use was changed sometime in the early 1800s to become a flour mill up until it was destroyed by fire in 1903. The mill cottages remain to this day and are residential homes, with the oak beams used in its construction still in place in the ground floor rooms and upper floor ceilings.

The mill pond that lay in front of the cottages which feed the mill wheel is no longer there having been filled in sometime after the first world war, but its outline can be seen within the adjacent Footherley Wood and the small piece of open land beside the bridge over the brook. It has been said but not proved that the fields to the side of the cottages were used by Oliver Cromwell as a camp site on his way north to Chester during the Civil War. The Chester Road being not more than a half a mill from the cottages.

The present day Little Aston Primary school which stands on the lane is not more than 100 yards from the former school which are now residential homes but if you inspect the buildings you will see the school boys and girls entrances detailed in the brick work of the buildings. These buildings stand opposite the blacksmiths old forge which is at the top of the lane close to Little Aston Road. The Blacksmiths forge is sometimes thought to have been why the lane was called Forge Lane, this is not correct as it was the forge mill further down the lane that gave rise to the lanes name. The blacksmiths forge was not only a forge but the site of the production and building of horse / farm carts and cart wheels. The blacksmiths forge stopped being used as a forge sometime during the 1950s, but today is back in use as a design studio and bespoke carpentry company.

=== Walsall Road ===
Running from the junction with Rosemary Hill Road to Forge Lane, Walsall Road (the A454) borders Little Aston Park. There are around 30 large detached houses on the roadside, and private gated communities such as Beechwood Croft and Woodside Drive where there are multimillion-pound homes.

=== Aldridge Road ===
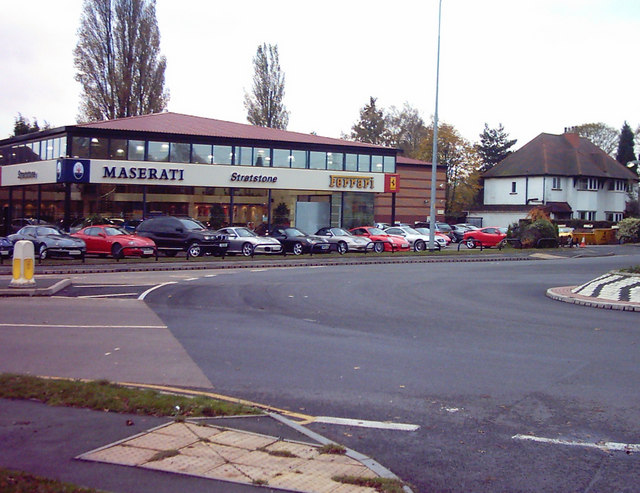
Former Ferrari and Maserati dealer

Continuing on from Walsall Road, Aldridge Road (also the A454) begins on the junction of Forge Lane and Roman Road. Aldridge Road becomes Little Aston Road at the point it crosses Footherley Brook approximately 100 yards before the junction with the A452 Chester Road. It is lined by around 170 houses both detached and semi detached. At the junction with the Chester Road is the former Evans Halshaw Porsche dealership, once a petroleum filling station which later became a Bentley dealership, then a Ferrari and Maserati dealership, and a classic car dealership. Currently the showroom is a Mercedes used car specialist.

The majority of Aldridge Road borders the northerly side of the Little Aston Golf Club, although it is hidden by trees. A stream called Footherley Brook runs alongside holes 12 and 13 of the golf course and underneath a small bridge on Aldridge Road. The bridge was damaged by flash flooding in the mid-1980s, causing the closure of Aldridge Road for many months. The stream then runs through a 2-acre private wood to the rear of a section of properties on Aldridge Road which is owned and maintained by one Aldridge Road resident and into the mill pond.

The area between the Footherley Brook and Chester Road, including Fotherley Brook Road and part of Little Aston Road, was moved from Aldridge (West Midlands) to Little Aston (Staffordshire) in 1994 by The Hereford and Worcester, Staffordshire and West Midlands (County and Metropolitan Borough Boundaries) Order 1993.

=== Little Aston Hall Estate ===
This small area of residence is situated within what used to be the grounds of Little Aston Hall. Seven blocks of superior apartments were constructed on the site during the mid-1980s, each containing six luxury living spaces. The complex is set back from the road on a private gated drive and situated in many acres of grassland and landscaped gardens.

=== Lady Aston Park ===
Lady Aston Park is a recent development of around 50 gated luxury apartments, aimed exclusively at the over 55s. The community borders the Little Aston Hall development, and is alongside the Bupa care home and private hospital. The estate is managed by the Lady Aston Park Management Co. Ltd which is in the ownership of the apartment owners. Day-to-day management is in the hands of an elected committee of residents.

== Administration ==
=== Electoral ward ===
Little Aston is an electoral ward of Lichfield District Council, although it is separated from the city by open country. It is in the Tamworth constituency for the UK Parliament. Its MP was Conservative Christopher Pincher from 2010 until he resigned in September 2023. At both the 2023 by-election and the 2024 general election the seat was won by Labour's Sarah Edwards.

=== Parish ===
Little Aston is a part of the civil parish of Shenstone. It became a separate ecclesiastical parish in 1874 when St Peter's Church was built at the expense of, and on land donated by, Edward Swynfen Parker Jervis (1815-1896), son of Edward Jervis Jervis, 2nd Viscount St Vincent. The new church was designed by architect George Edmund Street.

== Recreation and education ==
Little Aston has two golf clubs: the championship Little Aston Golf Club and the new Aston Wood Golf Club. A private Spire hospital is located on the former Little Aston Hall's estate and Little Aston also features a residential estate, Little Aston Park. Little Aston also has its own primary school, Little Aston Primary School, and next door is the Little Aston Recreation Ground. Located at the village hall is the tennis club and bowling green.

== Commerce and transport ==
Within the boundaries of Little Aston, there is only one independent newsagent, one gourmet butcher and one drink store, all located on Little Aston Lane. However, a wider ranges of local mini-supermarkets, hairdressers, fish and chips shops, restaurants and pubs are available in neighbouring Burnett Road Streetly and The Crown Four Oaks all half a mile (800 m) away, plus a wide range of trendy restaurants and major supermarkets in Mere Green a mile (1.6 km) away. A comprehensive high street is in Sutton Coldfield town centre.

Nearby junctions with the A38, M5, M6, M6 Toll and M42 give easy access to the north-east, north-west, south-west and south-east towards London. High speed trains towards Manchester and London are available from Lichfield and Birmingham, with connections available from Blake Street. National Express West Midlands service 6 also runs through Little Aston every 30 minutes between Walsall and Sutton Coldfield via Aldridge and Mere Green.

=== Air incidents ===
On 16 April 1966, a Cessna light aircraft crashed into the rear of number 21 Fotherley Brook Road, Little Aston, killing both the pilot and the passenger. The occupants of the house were unharmed.

During a school fete organised by the Sutton Coldfield Town Middle School Parent-Teacher Association, which was held in fields at Little Hardwick Road, Little Aston on 7 July 1973, a parachutist, 21-year-old RAF Sergeant Kenneth Cornwell, who was part of a five-man display team, became tangled in 275,000-volt overhead power lines. Attempts by the local fire brigade to reach him proved fruitless, as their turntable ladder was too short. A British Army Air Corps' Westland Sioux AH.1 helicopter, registration XT238, of the 16th/5th Queen's Royal Lancers was diverted from an appearance at another fete, at nearby St. Augustine's Church, Rugeley. It lowered a harness to Cornwell, but the helicopter was caught by wind and the rescue line wrapped around its tail rotor, severing the line. Cornwell dropped 40 feet to the ground, narrowly missing a tarpaulin that was being held for him to land on. The helicopter crash landed in a nearby field and burst into flames, but the two-man crew evacuated without serious injury. Cornwell—who by that time had been suspended for an hour and a half—survived with a broken wrist, broken pelvis, and both elbows broken and dislocated and was taken to Good Hope General Hospital, Sutton Coldfield.

A spokesman for the Central Electricity Generating Board, who operated the power lines, criticised the parachute display for its "danger of interference to the overhead transmission lines and to those taking part" and said they would have opposed it had they been consulted. It transpired that Cornwell was instructed to make jump with a type of parachute that he had not used previously. His instructor, Sergeant B. Anderson, was reprimanded by the Safety and Training Committee of the British Parachute Association and had his advanced and approved instructor ratings suspended. The helicopter was subsequently written off.

== See also ==
- Listed buildings in Shenstone, Staffordshire
