= Edward Jervis Jervis, 2nd Viscount St Vincent =

Edward Jervis Jervis, 2nd Viscount St Vincent (1 April 1767 – 25 September 1859) was an English peer.

== Early life ==
Jervis was born Edward Jervis Ricketts, the second son of William Henry Ricketts and Mary Jervis. Mary Jervis was the daughter of Swynfen Jervis, Rector of Meaford, Staffordshire and the sister of Admiral of the Fleet John Jervis, 1st Earl of St Vincent. He inherited the viscountcy of St Vincent in 1823 by special remainder on the death of his uncle and changed his name by Royal Licence to Edward Jervis Jervis. Jervis resided at the family seats of Meaford Hall and Little Aston Hall, both in Staffordshire. He was Lord of the manor of Little Aston. He owned the "Canaan" slave plantation in the British colony of Jamaica, which he inherited from his father.

== Marriages and children ==
Jervis married twice. On 29 January 1790 he married Hon Mary Cassandra Twisleton, daughter of Major-General Thomas Twisleton, 13th Baron Saye and Sele. They had two children before divorcing in 1799:

- Hon Maria Jervis (born ?, died 13 February 1869)
- Hon William Jervis Jervis (born 11 October 1794, died 1839), father of Carnegie Robert John Jervis, 3rd Viscount St Vincent (born 12 August 1825, died 19 July 1879)

On 14 April 1810 Jervis married Mary Anne Parker of Park Hall, Staffordshire with whom he had two further children:

- Hon Mary Anne Jervis (born c 1813, died 7 March 1893)
- Hon Edward Swynfen Parker-Jervis (born 3 February 1815, died 3 January 1896)

The 2nd Viscount's elder son William Jervis Jervis having pre-deceased him in 1839, he was succeeded on his death in 1859 by his grandson Carnegie Robert John Jervis, 3rd Viscount St Vincent. Viscountess St Vincent died on 3 January 1855.

Peerage of the United Kingdom
Preceded by John Jervis	Viscount St Vincent; 1823—1859	Succeeded by Carnegie Robert John Jervis
