= John Jervis, 1st Earl of St Vincent =

Royal Navy officer and politician (1735–1823)

Admiral of the Fleet The Right Honourable The Earl of St Vincent GCB PC
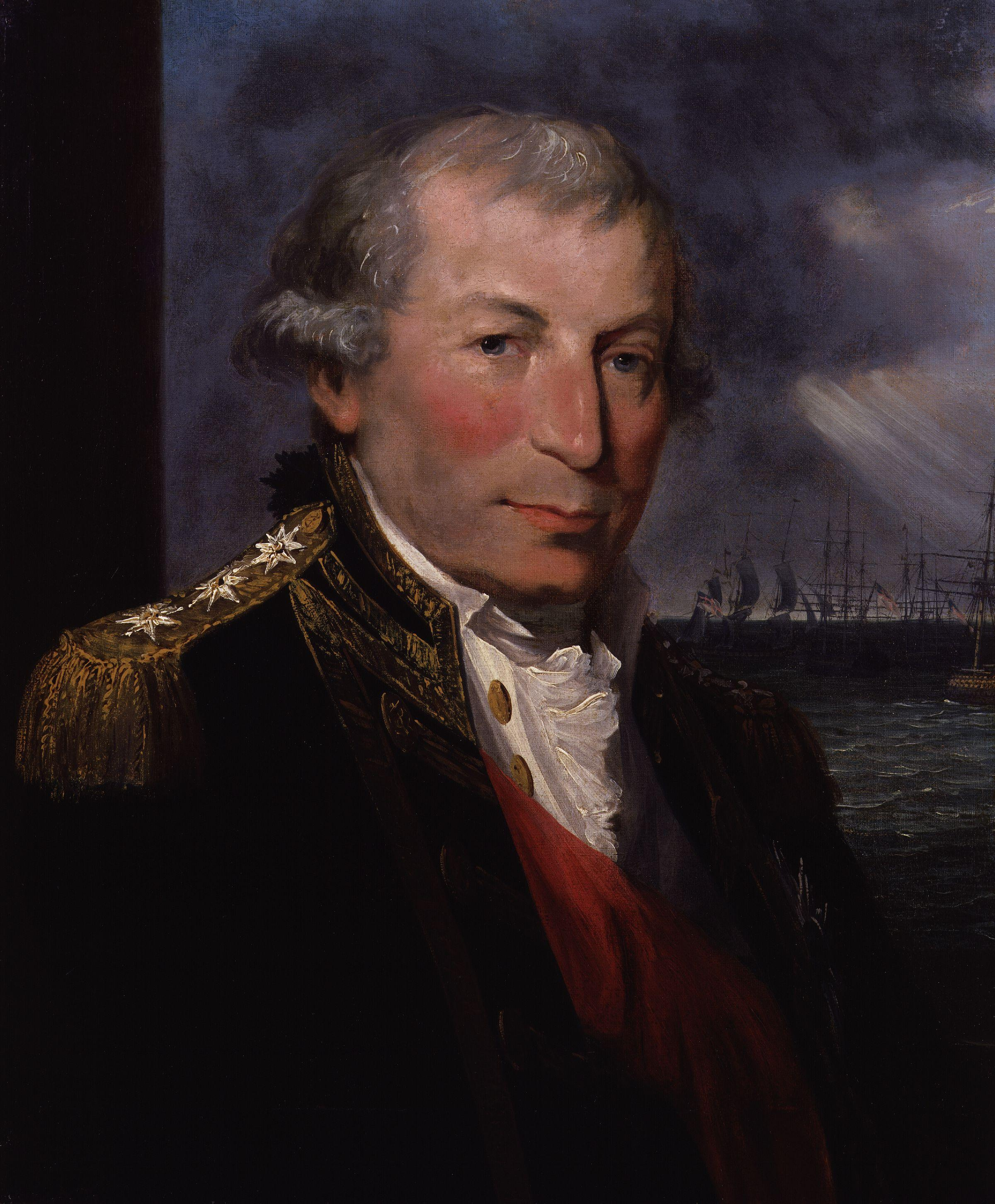
- Portrait by Lemuel Francis Abbott, 1795
- Born: 9 January 1735; Meaford Hall, Staffordshire
- Died: 13 March 1823 (aged 88); Brentwood, Essex
- Burial place: Stone, Staffordshire
- Military career
- Allegiance: Great Britain; United Kingdom
- Branch: Royal Navy
- Service years: 1749–1823
- Rank: Admiral of the Fleet
- Commands: HMS Porcupine; HMS Scorpion; HMS Albany; HMS Gosport; HMS Alarm; HMS Kent; HMS Foudroyant; Leeward Islands Station; Mediterranean Fleet; Channel Fleet; First Lord of the Admiralty
- Conflicts: Seven Years' War; Battle of the Plains of Abraham; American War of Independence; First Battle of Ushant; Battle of Ushant (1782); Battle of Cape Spartel; French Revolutionary Wars; Battle of Martinique (1794); Invasion of Guadeloupe (1794); Battle of Cape St. Vincent (1797); Napoleonic Wars

Admiral of the Fleet John Jervis, 1st Earl of St Vincent (9 January 1735 – 13 March 1823) was a Royal Navy officer and politician. Jervis served throughout the latter half of the 18th century and into the 19th, and was an active commander during the Seven Years' War, American War of Independence and the French Revolutionary and Napoleonic Wars. He is best known for his victory at the 1797 Battle of Cape St. Vincent, from which he earned his titles, and as a patron of Horatio Nelson.

Jervis was also recognised by both political and military contemporaries as a fine administrator and naval reformer. As Commander-in-chief of the Mediterranean, between 1795 and 1799 he introduced a series of severe standing orders to avert mutiny. He applied those orders to both seamen and officers alike, a policy that made him a controversial figure. He took his disciplinarian system of command with him when he took command of the Channel Fleet in 1799. In 1801, as First Lord of the Admiralty, he introduced a number of reforms that, though unpopular at the time, made the Navy more efficient and self-sufficient. He introduced innovations, including block making machinery at Portsmouth Dockyard. St Vincent was known for his generosity to officers he considered worthy of reward, and his swift and often harsh punishment of those he felt deserved it.

Jervis' entry in the Oxford Dictionary of National Biography by P. K. Crimmin describes his contribution to history: "His importance lies in his being the organiser of victories; the creator of well-equipped, highly efficient fleets; and in training a school of officers as professional, energetic, and devoted to the service as himself."

== Early life ==
John Jervis was born in Meaford Hall, Staffordshire, on 9 January 1735, the second son of Swynfen and Elizabeth Jervis. His father was a barrister, counsellor to the Admiralty Board and auditor of Greenwich Hospital. Swynfen Jervis intended that his son should follow him to the bar. The young Jervis was educated at Burton Grammar School and subsequently at Reverend Swinden's Academy in Greenwich, London.

Their family name Jervis is pronounced /ˈdʒɜːrvɪs/ JUR-vis.

== Early naval career ==
At the age of thirteen, Jervis ran away and joined the navy at Woolwich, London. After a short time he returned home as he had heard his family were very upset at his disappearance. Lady Jane Hamilton (mother of Sir William Hamilton) and Lady Burlington became aware of Jervis' desire to join the navy and lobbied his family on his behalf. Eventually, they introduced the Jervis family to Admiral George Townshend, who agreed to take the boy aboard one of his ships.

On 4 January 1749, Jervis entered the navy as an able seaman aboard the 50-gun Gloucester on her way to Jamaica. On arrival in the West Indies, Jervis was assigned to the sloop Ferret on the Mosquito Coast, where he saw constant service against Spanish guarda-costas and privateers.

When Townshend quit the West Indies, he discharged Jervis into the Severn under Admiral Thomas Cotes. Cotes' flag captain Henry Dennis rated Jervis as a midshipman. On 31 July 1754, Jervis was transferred to the 24-gun Sphinx. Jervis commented in a letter to his sister: "my chief employ when from my duty is reading studying navigation and perusing my old letters, of which I have almost enough to make an octavo volume."

While in Jamaica, the young Jervis drew funds against his father's account with a local banker. When the reply came from England that the withdrawal could not be honoured, the midshipman found himself in debt. Jervis was forced to quit his officer's mess and live as a common sailor until enough money was collected to pay off the loan. The event deeply affected the young Jervis, who swore never to "draw another bill without the certainty of it being paid".

Sphinx was paid off at Spithead on 7 November 1754. Jervis was assigned to the 20-gun HMS Seaford in December of the same year, and then from the end of December until February 1755 underwent further instruction onboard HM Yacht William and Mary under the navigational expert Captain John Campbell.

Jervis passed his lieutenant's examination on 2 January 1755 and was assigned as sixth lieutenant to the first-rate Royal George of 100 guns. By March, he had moved to third lieutenant of the 60-gun Nottingham. While serving on Nottingham, he participated in an attempt by the fleet of Admiral Edward Boscawen to prevent French reinforcements from reaching New France.

On 31 March 1756, Jervis moved to the 74-gun HMS Devonshire and on 22 June he was promoted to be fourth lieutenant of the 90-gun Prince under Captain Charles Saunders in the Mediterranean. When the captain was promoted to admiral, Jervis was assigned as one of his officers aboard the 74-gun Culloden in November 1756. By that time the Seven Years' War between Great Britain and France had begun.

In January 1757 Jervis was promoted to temporary command of HMS Experiment after her captain was incapacitated by sickness. As commander, he fought a larger French privateer in an indecisive action off Cape Gata. When the captain of the Experiment regained his health, Jervis moved back to Culloden.

In June 1757, he followed Saunders to the 90-gun HMS St George. Jervis returned to England in temporary command of the 80-gun Foudroyant, a ship that had been captured by Henry Osborn's fleet at the Battle of Cartagena. He followed Saunders once more when the admiral was promoted to command the North American station; Jervis was promoted to first lieutenant of HMS Prince.

=== Quebec and promotion to captain ===
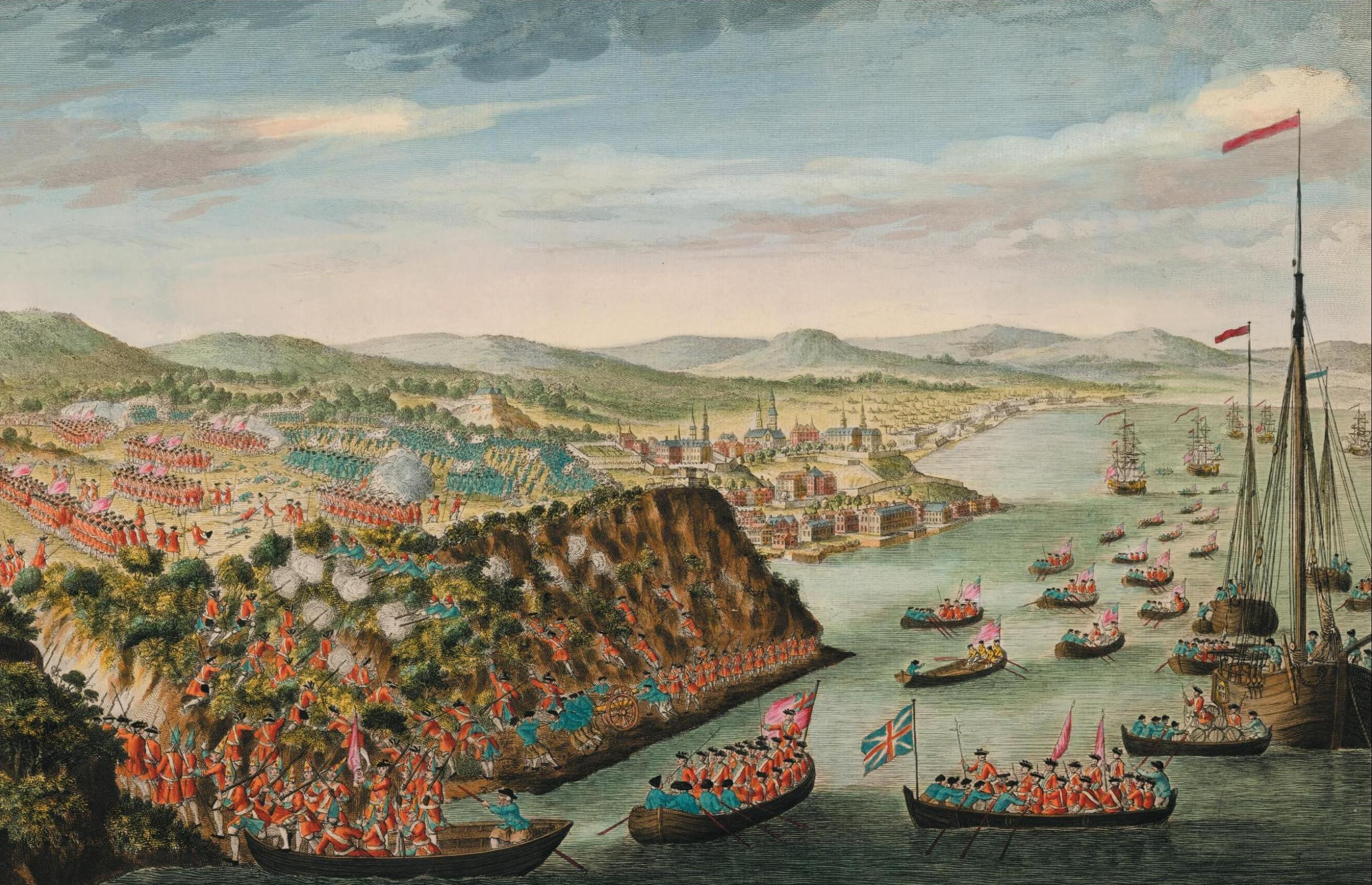
The Battle of the Plains of Abraham

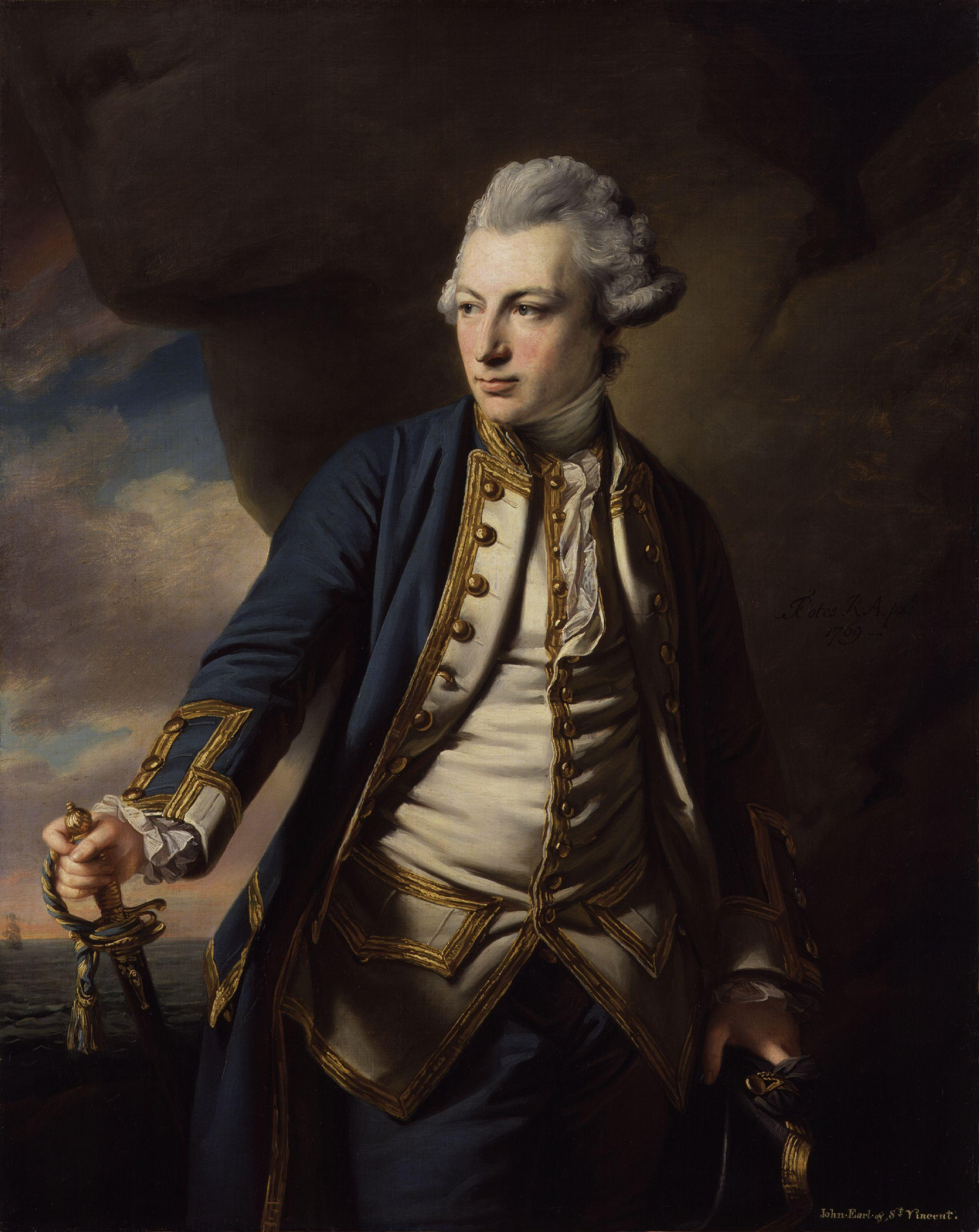
1769 portrait of Jervis by Francis Cotes

The fleet, part of an expedition to capture the French possessions in North America, left England in February 1759. They stopped first at Louisbourg, which had been captured from the French the previous year. By June, the ice along the Saint Lawrence River had broken up and the fleet along with the military transports headed up river to the assault of Quebec City. On 15 May 1759, Jervis had been promoted acting commander of the sloop HMS Porcupine. In this command Jervis impressed General James Wolfe in the preparations that led to the Battle of the Plains of Abraham. Porcupine and the frigate Halifax led the armed transports past Quebec to land up river. One biographer, Jedediah Tucker, notes that as the approach was so critical, both Wolfe and James Cook boarded Porcupine to ensure the success of the mission.

For his efforts Jervis was promoted commander and took command of HMS Scorpion. Jervis returned to England in September but immediately returned to North America in command of the Albany. In May 1760 Jervis was attached to Admiral Sir George Rodney's Channel squadron. In October 1760 he was made post-captain in command of the 44-gun Gosport. Gosport had on board a young midshipman, George Elphinstone, later Viscount Keith, who took over Jervis' command in the Mediterranean after Jervis' departure in 1799. In 1762, HMS Gosport, HMS Danae and HMS Superb under Captain Joshua Rowley, convoyed the East and West Indian trade to the westward, and successfully protected it from the squadron of Commodore de Ternay.

By the end of 1763, with the end of the Seven Years' War, Gosport had been paid off and Jervis remained unemployed until February 1769, when he was appointed to the 32-gun HMS Alarm, the first coppered warship in the Royal Navy. He was tasked with delivering bullion to British merchants in Genoa. During his time in Genoa, two Ottoman galley slaves escaped from a Genoese navy galley and hid aboard one of Alarm's boats. They were forcibly removed by Genoese authorities, to which Jervis made an official protest and promised retaliation if they were not handed over. Both were produced and Jervis took custody of them.

On 30 March 1770, Alarm was driven ashore off Marseille, but with the efforts of Jervis, the crew and the local French authorities under the governor of Marseille, Georges René Le Peley de Pléville she was brought off and repaired. Jervis personally returned to Marseille with a letter of thanks from the Board of the Admiralty to the governor for his assistance. In 1771 Alarm returned to England to collect the Duke of Gloucester, King George III's brother, in order that he could winter in Italy. He lived aboard with his entourage until May 1772, when Alarm returned to England and was paid off.

=== Touring Europe and Russia ===
Between October 1772 and June 1775, Jervis travelled extensively. He began in France, where he studied the language and made observations about French life. He accompanied Captain Samuel Barrington to Russia where they spent time in Saint Petersburg and inspected the arsenal and dockyards at Kronstadt and took a tour of the yacht designed by Sir Charles Knowles for Catherine of Russia.

The pair continued on to Sweden, Denmark and northern Germany. All the while Jervis made notes on defences, harbour charts and safe anchorages. They came home via the Netherlands, Jervis once again making extensive studies of the area and taking copious notes describing any useful information. He and Barrington then took a private cruise along the Channel coast, calling at various harbours, including Brest, making and improving their charts as they went. When Jervis later became the Commander-in-Chief of the Channel Fleet he was aided significantly in his blockade of Brest by these charts. In later years, he commented: "Had the young Captain Jervis not performed such a complete survey of this port then the Earl St Vincent would not have been able to effect such a thorough blockade of it."

== American War of Independence ==
=== First Battle of Ushant ===
At the outbreak of the American War of Independence in 1775 Jervis was given the command of HMS Kent; however, she was surveyed by the dockyard and found unfit for service. He was therefore appointed instead to command of HMS Foudroyant, the ship he had brought to England as a prize seventeen years earlier.

For the first few years of the war, the French supplied arms, funding, and military advice on an informal and limited basis to the newly emerging nation of America. With the signing of the Treaty of Alliance in 1778 and the creation of the Franco-American alliance, the war widened.

Jervis spent the first few years of the war patrolling the Channel in Foudroyant without seeing any significant action, but as the war reached Europe Jervis was placed under the command of Admiral Augustus Keppel. The Channel fleet, under Keppel, sighted the French fleet intending to enter Brest on 23 July. The British fleet of 30 ships of the line chased the French fleet of 29 ships and engaged them on 27 July in what became known as the First Battle of Ushant. The battle was indecisive and in the political aftermath Jervis provided a stalwart defence of Admiral Keppel at the latter's court-martial, helping to secure Keppel's acquittal.

=== Relieving Gibraltar and capture of Pégase ===
Howe's relief of Gibraltar in 1782

Jervis remained in Foudroyant attached to the Channel Fleet and for a short time acted as flag captain to Admiral Molyneux Shuldham. In 1780 Jervis was with Admiral Rodney when the British fleet relieved Gibraltar. In 1781 he was with Admiral George Darby at the second relief of Gibraltar.

On 19 April 1782 Jervis was with his old friend and travelling companion when a ship in Admiral Barrington's squadron sighted a French convoy leaving Brest. The squadron gave chase and Foudroyant caught and engaged the French 74-gun Pégase. After an engagement of more than an hour Pégase struck. Jervis himself was wounded in the attack. For his services he was invested as a Knight of the Bath on 19 May 1782.

He was again at the relief of Gibraltar with Earl Howe's fleet in 1782 and took part in the indecisive Battle of Cape Spartel. Jervis was promoted commodore and hoisted his broad pennant in the 50-gun HMS Salisbury in December 1782, with orders to proceed to the West Indies. Due to the peace negotiations his orders were rescinded and he struck his pennant on 14 January 1783.

== Marriage and political office ==
During the peace Jervis married his cousin Martha, daughter of Lord Chief Baron Sir Thomas Parker. Jervis was also returned as MP for Launceston in 1783. Jervis began his political career in earnest and voted for Pitt's parliamentary reforms and against Charles James Fox and his East India Bill. During the elections of 1784 Jervis stood for election in the independent borough of Great Yarmouth, where he was returned as MP alongside Henry Beaufoy. Jervis then voted against Pitt's further bills for reform but supported him once more during the 1788–1789 Regency Crisis. On 24 September 1787 Jervis was promoted to Rear-Admiral of the Blue and hoisted his flag in the 74-gun Carnatic for several months during the tensions arising from the Prussian invasion of Holland.

In 1790 Jervis was recalled to service once more and moved his flag to the second-rate Prince during the Nootka Sound crisis that threatened war between England and Spain. In the same year Jervis was promoted to Rear-Admiral of the White on 21 September and stood down as MP for Great Yarmouth and stood instead for the Chipping Wycombe seat, to which he was returned as MP alongside the Earl Wycombe. With his interest in politics wavering he spoke rarely and then almost exclusively on naval matters. In 1792 Jervis proposed a scheme to alleviate the financial hardship of superannuated seamen. He later withdrew the proposal as Viscount Melville promised that the matter would be addressed by the Admiralty Board. In 1794 he resigned his seat and did not stand again for political office.

== French Revolutionary and Napoleonic Wars ==
On 1 February 1793 Jervis was promoted to Vice-Admiral of the Blue and was appointed as Commander-in-Chief, Leeward Islands. Jervis took with him an army that, combined with the navy, formed a joint military expedition. The goal of the expedition was to capture French colonies and thereby weaken France's international trade. The army commander was Sir Charles Grey, a friend and political ally.

Jervis hoisted his flag in HMS Boyne. He took Grey's son, Captain George Grey, as his flag-captain. The combined forces captured the French colonies of Martinique, Guadeloupe and Saint Lucia.

Capture of Fort Louis, Martinique 20 March 1794 by William Anderson

The French counter-attacked and recaptured Guadeloupe on 2 June 1794. Jervis and Grey landed a force to recapture the island but were repulsed by the reinforced French garrison and the British expedition withdrew.

In November 1794 Admiral Benjamin Caldwell replaced Jervis. Disputes over prize money were widely held as the reason that Jervis and Grey were not awarded peerages for their service. The prize money for the capture of the three islands, when finally calculated, amounted to £70,000 that was due to the officers and men of the navy. Adjusted for inflation this would equal approximately £8.6 million as of 2024.

Grey and Jervis' enemies proposed a vote of censure against the general and admiral. The vote itself was negative. Jervis and Grey were however awarded the thanks of both Houses of Parliament for their services. On 12 April 1794 Jervis was promoted to Vice-Admiral of the White.

=== Command of the Mediterranean Fleet ===
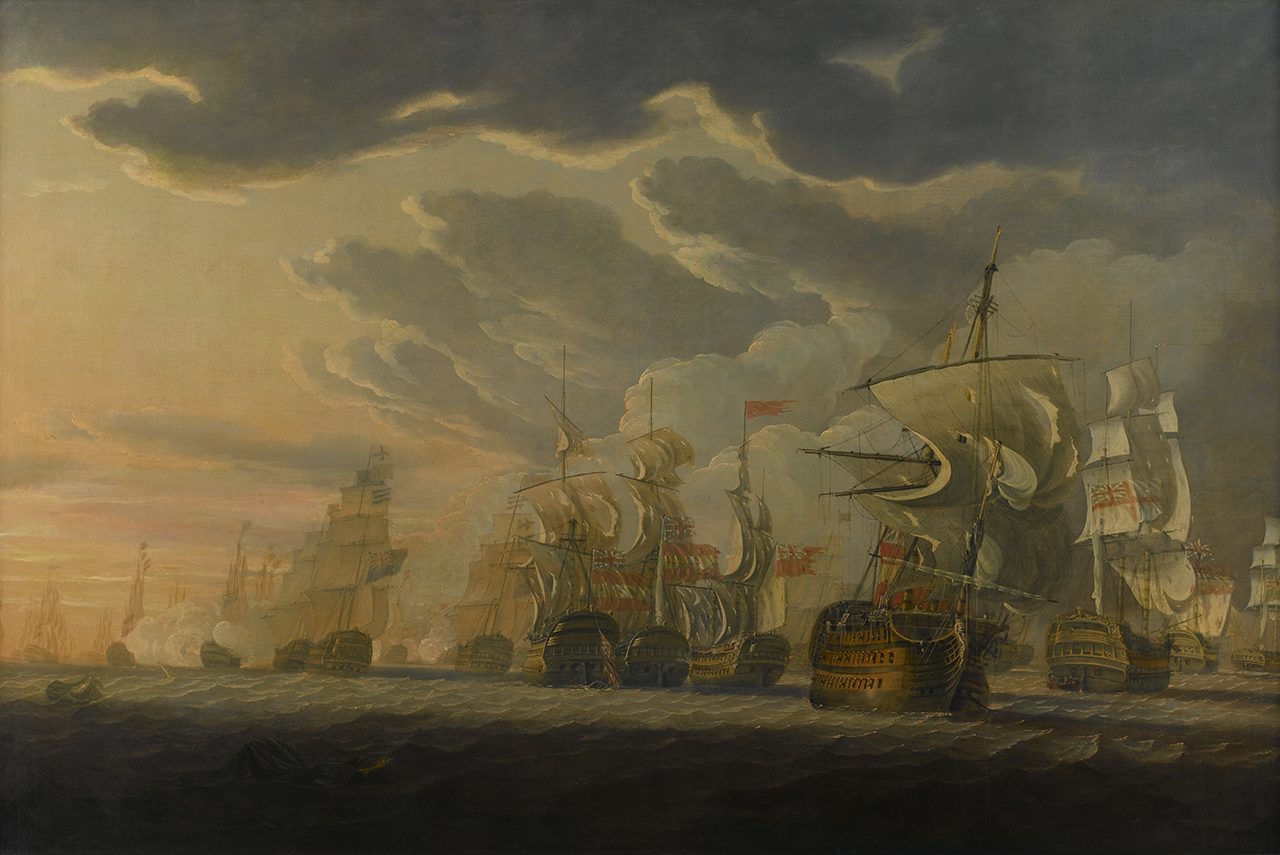
The Battle of Cape St. Vincent, 14 February 1797 by Robert Cleveley

Jervis was promoted to Admiral of the Blue on 1 June 1795 and appointed to command the Mediterranean Fleet. Boyne had caught fire on 1 May 1795 and had blown up in Spithead, the result of an accident, and Jervis lost almost all of his possessions.

Jervis went to take command of the Mediterranean fleet in the frigate Lively and once more took Charles Grey's son, Captain George Grey, as his flag-captain. Jervis also took Robert Calder as his captain of the fleet.

On arrival at Gibraltar Jervis took HMS Victory as his flagship. Among Jervis' subordinates were Captains Horatio Nelson, Cuthbert Collingwood, and Thomas Troubridge.

Jervis began a close blockade of Toulon and Nelson was assigned the task of aiding the Austrian army along the Italian coast. By September 1796 the British presence in the Mediterranean had become untenable. Napoleon had beaten Britain's Austrian allies, who were in disarray, and in October, Spain surrendered and allied themselves to the French.

Jervis recalled Admiral Robert Mann to aid in the blockade of Cadiz. Mann took his ships instead to Spithead. Jervis abandoned Corsica between September and November 1796 and withdrew his forces to Gibraltar.

==== Battle of Cape St. Vincent ====
A Spanish fleet made up of twenty-four line-of-battle ships and seven frigates sailed from Toulon on 1 February 1797. Jervis' fleet of ten ships-of-the-line was patrolling off Cape Saint Vincent and was subsequently joined by five more under Sir William Parker. The Spanish admiral, José de Córdoba, had taken his ships into the Atlantic to weather a storm and was making his way to Cadiz when the two fleets caught sight of each other at dawn on 14 February 1797.

The British fleet had fifteen line-of-battle ships against the twenty-four Spanish ships. On the quarterdeck of Victory, Jervis and his flag captain, Robert Calder, counted the ships. It was at this point Jervis discovered that he was outnumbered nearly two-to-one:

"There are eight sail of the line, Sir John"
"Very well, sir"
"There are twenty sail of the line, Sir John"
"Very well, sir"
"There are twenty five sail of the line, Sir John"
"Very well, sir"
"There are twenty seven sail of the line, Sir John"
"Enough, sir, no more of that; the die is cast, and if there are fifty sail I will go through them."

A passenger aboard Victory, Captain Benjamin Hallowell, achieved a brief notoriety for slapping the admiral on the back and calling out "That's right Sir John, that's right. By God, we shall give them a damned good licking!"

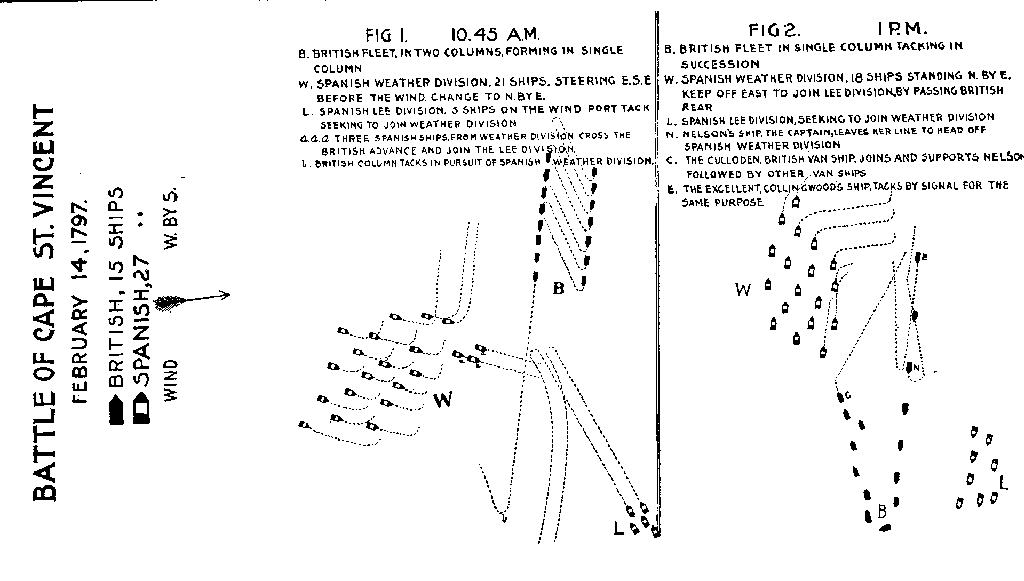
Plan of the Fleet Deployment During the Battle of Cape St. Vincent, 14 February 1797 by Alfred Thayer Mahan

During the battle Nelson, in command of HMS Captain, wore out of line and performed a stunning feat by capturing two of the enemy vessels within moments. Nelson and his crew boarded and captured one and crossed her deck and boarded and captured the second, which had collided in the smoke and general melee of the battle. The move was later feted by the public and press and dubbed "Nelson's patent bridge for boarding first-rates".

When the Spanish retreated Jervis did not press his advantage but consolidated his victory and began the lengthy job of repairing his ships and restoring their crews. The British had suffered casualties of 73 killed and 227 wounded.

Sir John did not mention Nelson's achievement in his initial despatch to the Admiralty despite Nelson's obvious contribution to the success of the battle. In later despatches Jervis did mention Nelson. In one anecdote, when discussing the battle with his flag-captain, Sir Robert, who had been mentioned in the despatch and had been awarded a knighthood for his services, brought up the issue of Nelson's disobedience of the admiral's orders for having worn out of the line of battle in order to engage the enemy. Jervis silenced him by saying: "It certainly was so, and if you ever commit such a breach of your orders, I will forgive you also."

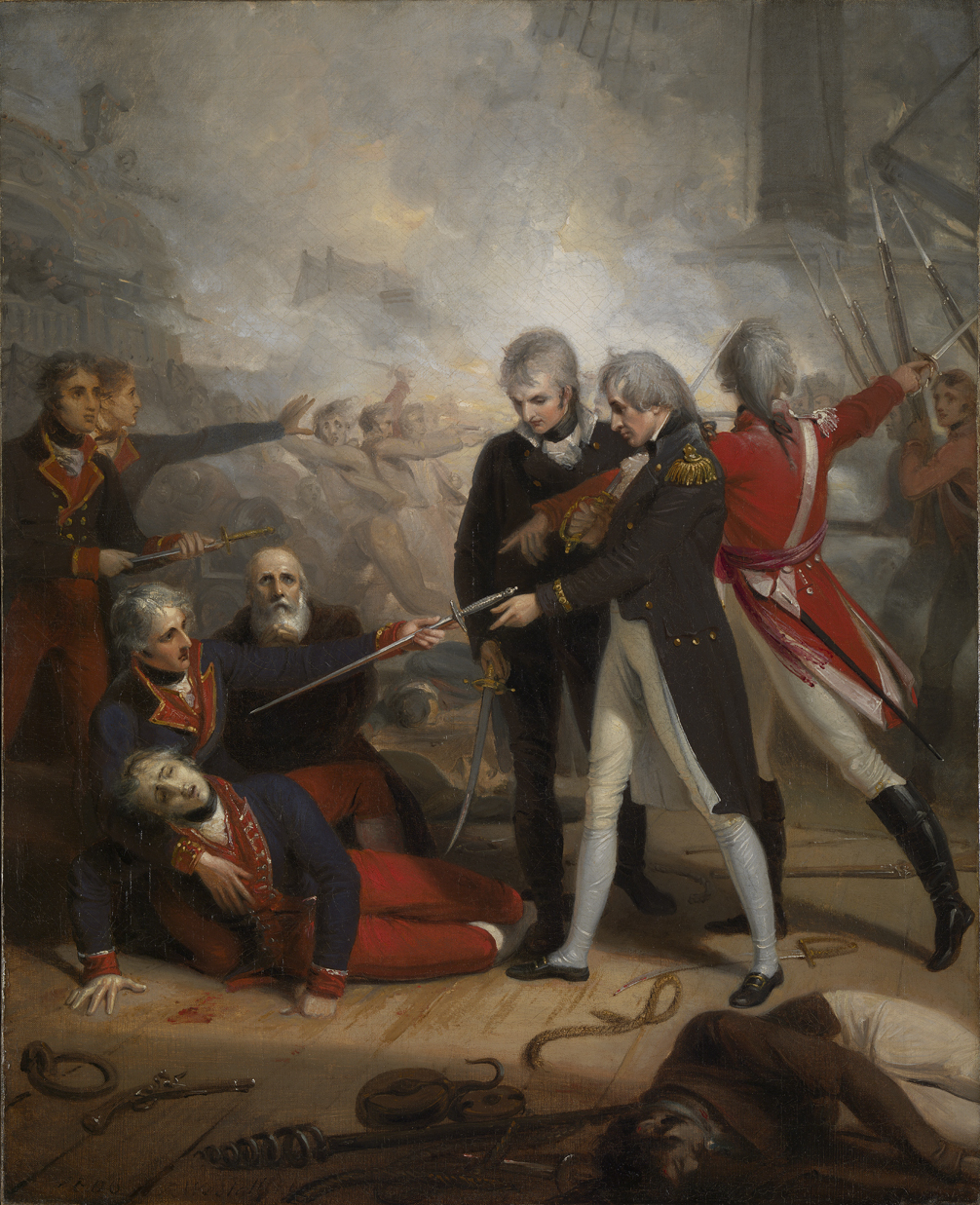
Captain Nelson at the Surrender of the San Nicolas by Richard Westall

Despite the capture of only four vessels, the Battle of Cape Saint Vincent became celebrated as an outstanding victory and the awards and recognition far outweighed the achievement. The bad news of the evacuation of the Mediterranean, the capitulation of the Spanish and the Italian city-states and the defeat of the Austrian army, alongside the increasing threat of a French invasion of Britain, had depressed the politicians and general public. A victory, such as that of Cape Saint Vincent, was more important for the morale of the country as a whole than its military ramifications.

Annuity for Earl Saint Vincent Act 1798
- Act of Parliament
- Parliament of Ireland
- Long title: An Act for settling and securing a certain annuity on John, Earl St Vincent, and the two next persons to whom the title of Earl St Vincent shall descend, in consideration of the eminent service performed by the said John Earl St Vincent to his majesty and the public.
- Citation: 38 Geo. 3. c. 71 (I)
- Territorial extent: Ireland

Dates
- Royal assent: 6 October 1798
- Commencement: 18 August 1798 (Note: Section 1.)
Other legislation
Amended by	Annuity to Lord Saint Vincent Act 1806

Text of statute as originally enacted

Annuity to Lord Saint Vincent Act 1806
- Act of Parliament
- Parliament of the United Kingdom
- Long title: An Act for extending the annuity granted to the Earl of St. Vincent, to the two next persons to whom the title of Viscount St. Vincent is limited.
- Citation: 46 Geo. 3. c. 50
- Territorial extent: United Kingdom

Dates
- Royal assent: 23 May 1806
- Commencement: 23 May 1806 (Note: The Acts of Parliament (Commencement) Act 1793.)
- Repealed: 18 December 1953
Other legislation
Amends	Annuity for Earl Saint Vincent Act 1798
Repealed by	Statute Law Revision Act 1953

Status: Repealed

Text of statute as originally enacted

Both Jervis and Nelson were hailed as heroes and Jervis was made Baron Jervis of Meaford and Earl St Vincent. Songs were written about Jervis and the battle, and there was a general feeling of relief in both the government and people of Britain. Nelson for his services was invested as a Knight of the Bath. The now Earl St Vincent was granted a pension for life of £3,000 per year. The City of London had already presented him with the Freedom of the City in a gold box valued at 100 guineas for his success in the West Indies and for this battle awarded him a presentation sword. The presentation box and sword are both currently held at the National Maritime Museum, Greenwich.

Nelson was also awarded his freedom of the City of London for the Battle of Cape St. Vincent, and was later to get a presentation sword for the Nile. The sword awarded to Jervis was the first of its kind that the City of London issued. St Vincent was awarded the thanks of both Houses of Parliament and given a gold medal by the King.

The London Gazette published an advertisement in 1798 regarding the prize money that was due to the officers and men who had fought at the battle. The sum quoted was £140,000, equivalent to about £17.3 million in 2024, of which, as admiral, Jervis was entitled to a sizeable share. Jervis resumed his blockade of the Spanish fleet in Cadiz. Jervis was later sued in court by Sir William Parker owing to a dispute of monies between the admiral and junior officers.

==== Mutiny and discipline ====
During 1797 there was considerable discontent among the seamen of the Royal Navy. This discontent manifested itself at the Nore and at Spithead when the greater part of the Channel Fleet rose up against their officers.

These mutinies were not overly violent and the officers were put ashore and the heads of the mutinies established their own order and kept the ships under "committee" control until their collective demands were met. The mutineers' demands ranged from discontent at cruel officers to poor pay and long sea service without shore leave.

There were other mutinies throughout the Navy that year, most notably HMS Hermione and HMS Marie Antoinette, both on the Jamaica station. These mutinies resulted in the crews killing their officers and taking their ships into enemy-held ports.

Jervis had the reputation as a disciplinarian and put in place a new system that would ensure that the men in the Mediterranean fleet did not mutiny. To begin with the admiral wrote a new set of standing orders. For example, Jervis divided the seamen and marines and berthed the two separately, putting the marines between the officers aft and the men forward. Thus he created an effective barrier between officers and potentially unruly crews.

Jervis discouraged conversation in Irish, though he did not ban it. He ordered the marine detachments to be paraded every morning and, if there was a band available, for God Save the King to be played. The marine detachment was then to remain armed at all times. Marines and soldiers were also excused from duties in regard to the general running of the ship.

In order to keep his crews active and to ensure that the Spanish did not perceive that there might be discontent in the fleet, Jervis ordered the nightly bombardment of Cadiz in his own words to "Divert the animal."

The admiral isolated the ships from one another to minimise collusion and the opportunities the men might have to band together in mutiny. St Vincent did ensure, however, that the men under his command were cared for. When the stock of tobacco ran low the Admiral ensured that the supply was renewed from his own funds. When the postmaster in Lisbon detained the letters and packets arriving from England for the men for fear that they would carry seditious communications, Jervis set up a post office aboard his flagship HMS Ville de Paris to receive and distribute all the letters that arrived for both seamen, marines and officers.

Jervis strictly adhered to the Articles of War and individual regulations that he had written for his fleet. Any infraction was dealt with harshly and he was renowned for treating both officers and seamen with the same harsh discipline. As an example, one officer who allowed his boats crew to plunder a fishing boat was placed before a court martial and it was ordered that he be "degraded from the rank of Midshipman in the most ignominious manner by having his uniform stripped from his back on the quarter deck of the (ship unknown)[sic]. before the whole ship's company and to be further disposed of as the Commander-in-chief shall direct. To be mulcted of his pay now due to him for his services on board any ship of his Majesty's service and to be rendered incapable of ever serving as an Officer or a Petty Officer in any of His Majesty's ships." Jervis later personally directed that the midshipman should have his head shaved, a notice hung around his neck describing his crime and that he should be solely responsible for the cleaning of the head (naval term for the communal toilets situated at the bow of the ship) until further notice.

In another incident, St Vincent instructed that two men aboard HMS St George who were tried for mutiny on a Saturday were executed on Sunday. The men were duly executed but Admiral Charles Thompson raised an objection to formal executions on the Sabbath and Jervis wrote to the Board of Admiralty demanding Thompson's removal or that they accept his own resignation. The Board relieved Thompson. On 9 July 1797 Nelson wrote to Jervis congratulating him in his resolve and wholeheartedly supporting his decision to execute the men on a Sunday.

Jervis could also be exceptionally kind when he felt that the situation warranted it. On one occasion, while the fleet was becalmed the men of the flagship were ordered to bathe. The men leapt over the side to swim in a sail that had been lowered over the side. One of the men, a senior able seaman, jumped in wearing his trousers. In one of the pockets he had his prize money and back pay that he had been saving for several years. The bank notes were destroyed by the water and when the man came aboard and discovered what had happened he began to weep. The Admiral saw the man and asked the problem. One of his officers told him and St Vincent went to his cabin. When he returned he had the crew mustered and called the man forward. "Roger Odell you are convicted, Sir, by your own appearance of tarnishing the British oak with tears. What have you to say in your defence why you should not receive what you deserve?" The man told him what had happened and St Vincent replied "Roger Odell you are one of the best men in this ship you are moreover a captain of a top and in my life I never saw a man behave himself better in battle than you did in the Victory in the action with the Spanish fleet. To show therefore that your Commander-in-chief will never pass over merit wheresoever he may find it. There is your money Sir!" The Earl produced £70 of his own money and presented it to the surprised sailor "but no more tears mind, no more tears Sir".

When Nelson returned to the Mediterranean St Vincent wrote to Earl Spencer, First Lord of the Admiralty: "I do assure your Lordship that the arrival of Admiral Nelson has given me new life; you could not have gratified me more than in sending him. His presence in the Mediterranean is so very essential." St Vincent detached Nelson to pursue Napoleon in his invasion of Egypt

Rear-Admiral Sir John Orde, who was senior to Nelson, complained publicly and bitterly about what he considered a personal slight. Jervis ordered Orde home. Orde requested that he be court-martialled in order that he might have the opportunity to clear his name. The Board refused. Orde then requested that St Vincent be brought before a court-martial. Again, the Board refused. The Board censured Jervis for not having supported his subordinates.

Orde later challenged the ageing admiral to a duel. The challenge became public knowledge and the king ordered Jervis to decline. Before the challenge was formally declined, Orde wrote to the Board to inform them that he had withdrawn it.

When the men aboard the Marlborough refused to execute a man for mutinous behaviour and their captain did nothing, the Earl threatened the captain with replacement and had boats from the rest of the fleet armed with carronades surround the Marlborough; he then threatened to sink the ship if his orders were not carried out. The man was duly executed. St Vincent turned to an officer beside him watching the mutineer hanging from the yard arm and said "Discipline is preserved, Sir!"

Between 1797 and 1799, alongside the suppression of mutiny, Jervis set himself the task of improving the dockyards and defences of Gibraltar. Having had great difficulty supplying the fleet with fresh water, the Admiral arranged for large water tanks to be built in Gibraltar. In addition St Vincent planned the building of a new Victualling Yard to replenish his ships, and the upgrading of the dockyards. After the Battle of the Nile the dockyards, under Jervis' watchful eye, managed to successfully repair most of the fleet.

Lady Lavinia Bingham, wife of Earl Spencer, wrote to St Vincent to congratulate him for having provided the necessary tools for Nelson to have achieved the victory he did at the Nile. "Never did disinterested zeal and friendship meet with a brighter reward than yours has reaped in this victory of your gallant friend." Nelson commented that he had "never beheld a fleet equal to Sir John Jervis'".

On 14 February 1799 St Vincent was promoted to Admiral of the White. Constant service and approaching old age meant that the admiral became increasingly unwell. Despite his failing health, St Vincent was reluctant to relinquish command and the Board reluctant to supersede him. By 17 June he had no choice but to resign his command and return to England. During his time ashore the Earl lived in Rochetts, in South Weald, Essex, with his wife.

=== Command of the Channel Fleet ===
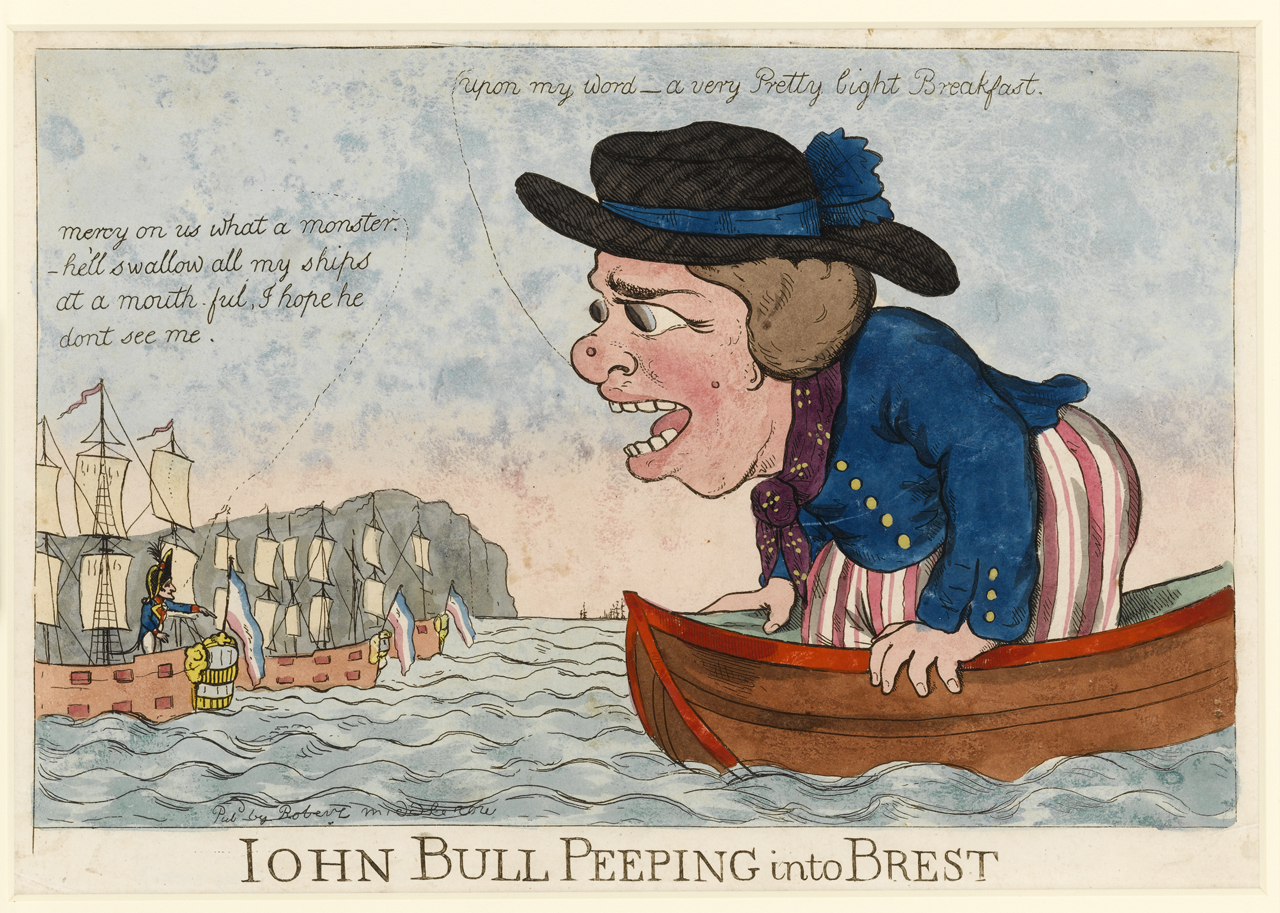
John Bull Peeping into Brest, The caption above the French fleet reads: "Mercy on us what a Monster – he'll swallow all my ships at a mouthful. I hope he don't see me."

As his health had improved he was given command of the Channel Fleet. St Vincent was to comment "The King and the government require it and the discipline of the British Navy demands it. It is of no consequence to me whether I die afloat or ashore. The die is cast."

He took command of the Channel fleet in HMS Namur on 26 April 1800 and took up a close blockade of Brest. Once at Brest he transferred to Ville de Paris of 110 guns and took Sir Thomas Troubridge as his captain of the fleet. He was also accompanied by his personal physician, Doctor Andrew Baird. Baird was later to become instrumental in the plans of the commander-in-chief and the health and well being of the Channel fleet.

St Vincent's appointment was not popular among the officers of the Channel fleet. His reputation as a strict disciplinarian had followed him from the Mediterranean and he immediately issued orders banning officers and captains from sleeping ashore and forbade them from travelling more than three miles from their ship. The wife of one of his captains is said to have toasted the news of his appointment with the line "May his next glass of wine choke the wretch."

Among other strict regulations introduced were orders that ships were to be repaired where possible at sea and that Ushant was to be the official rendezvous for the Channel fleet rather than the traditional Torbay. Ships were forbidden to go to Spithead without specific written orders from the Admiral or Admiralty.

With the charts that he had made with Barrington in 1775 the inshore squadron at Brest was able to keep a much tighter blockade. In one incident, the inshore squadron sighted several French ships leaving Brest. Sir Edward Pellew, captain of HMS Impétueux, gave chase. The rear admiral in charge of the inshore squadron recalled him, worried that Impétueux would run aground. The French escaped.

After several letters went back and forth between the two admirals, St Vincent, tired of his subordinate's excuses, took the entire offshore squadron and sailed them between the inshore squadron and the shore, thus proving that the ships had a shallow enough draught to have given chase and captured the French. St Vincent then wrote to the rear admiral and suggested that he strike his flag and return to shore for some needed rest.

St Vincent was as generous in the Channel as he had been in the Mediterranean. A particular letter from England made the admiral host a dinner aboard the flagship for fifty of the officers whom he felt closest to. At the dinner he revealed that the letter was from an orphanage near Paddington in London. The orphanage had run out of money to support the children of sailors who had died in the service of their country. St Vincent solicited from each captain and lieutenant a sum of money and then added his own donation. The cutter sailed back to England the same evening. St Vincent gave the orphanage £1,000

St Vincent's skills as an administrator and logistician came into play, particularly regarding the health and well being of the fleet. St Vincent wrote to Earl Spencer, commenting "I have ever considered the care of the sick and wounded as one of the first duties of a Commander-in-chief, by sea or land." Based on Doctor Baird's advice on cleanliness and hygiene the admiral brought in as many fresh vegetables as he could, along with vast quantities of fresh lemon juice to minimise illness, particularly scurvy.

The effect was dramatic. The hospital ship that accompanied the fleet was sent home unneeded and in November 1800 when the fleet came to anchor in Torbay there were as few as sixteen hospital cases among the estimated twenty three thousand men. In a letter to Sir Evan Nepean, first secretary to the Admiralty, St Vincent described Baird as "the most valuable man in the Navy not excepting the Board itself,"

The oncoming winter of 1800–1801 forced the admiral to live ashore at Torre Abbey overlooking Torbay. Vice-Admiral Sir Henry Harvey took over operational command of the fleet in St Vincent's absence.

In 1801 in a letter to the Board of Admiralty, St Vincent made the now famous remark: "I do not say, my Lords, that the French will not come. I say only they will not come by sea." In 1801 St Vincent was replaced by Admiral William Cornwallis and the new Prime Minister Henry Addington promoted St Vincent to First Lord of the Admiralty.

== First Lord of the Admiralty ==
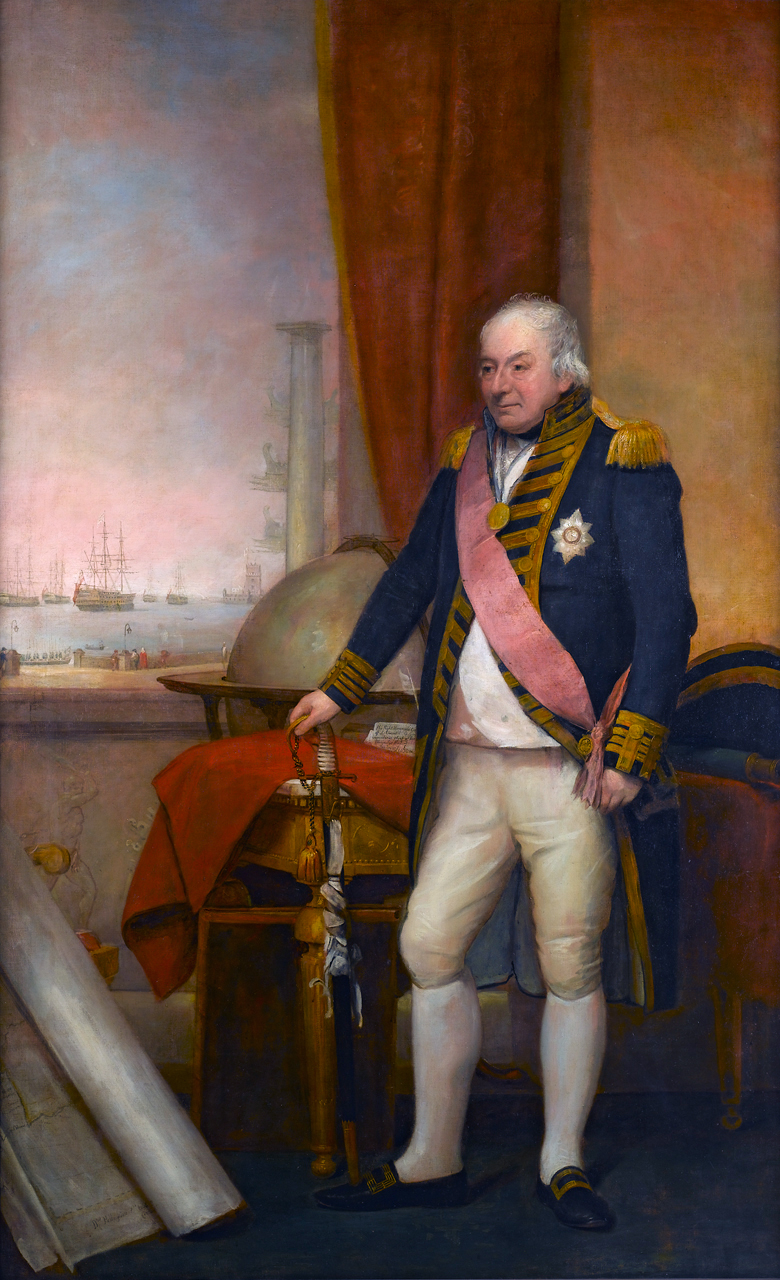
John Jervis 1st Earl of St Vincent, 1806 by Domenico Pellegrini

In January 1801 St Vincent had written a short letter to the then First Lord Earl Spencer stating: "Nothing short of a radical sweep in the dockyards can cure the enormous evils and corruptions in them; and this cannot be attempted till we have peace." As First Lord St Vincent intended to investigate, discover and remove all of the corruption that he considered plagued the Navy, the Royal Dockyards and their civilian administration. Consequently, he clashed with the various Navy Boards, the civil administration of the Royal Navy that administered among other things the navy yards and stores. St Vincent saw these boards and individuals as hindering the efforts of the Navy.

=== Commission of Inquiry ===
During the peace with France, after the Treaty of Amiens was signed on 27 March 1802, St Vincent ordered the Navy Board to begin an investigation for fraud and corruption in the Royal Dockyards. He swiftly found that the investigations were not being conducted effectively and ordered the commissioners to retrieve all logs and accounts and inventories and put them under their "personal seal" in anticipation of the Admiralty Board travelling to the various yards itself and conducting their own inspection.

The investigation began in earnest in 1802. St Vincent swiftly uncovered casual and obvious abuses of the system. Some men were listed as having done work, then over-time and then acted as night watchmen for years without a break of any kind. Others were listed as workmen ashore but also as sailors receiving pay in the Receiving Ship. Work was done and then the identical work was charged for over various periods, often by different departments or sections. In another yard, "The men of an entire department were found to be incapables, as old, infirm boys, cripples, or idiots, and the department itself to have the appearance of an asylum for every rogue and vagabond that could not obtain a meal by any other means."

St Vincent found that minor dockyard officials were the tip of a far bigger pattern of corruption. He lobbied the government to create a special commission of inquiry that would have the power to question suspects under oath. The cabinet determined that the outcome of such an inquiry might be damaging politically (and possibly, in some cases, personally) and gave the board of inquiry permission to question suspects under oath but gave the suspects the right to refuse to answer questions that might incriminate themselves. This addendum prevented the inquiry from acting effectively.

The Commission of Inquiry produced twelve reports:

1. Foreign Yards;
2. the Chatham Chest (the pension fund for seamen);
3. supply of Blocks and Naval Cooperage;
4. prize money and prize causes;
5. the Collection of the sixpence from Merchant Seamen;
6. the Economy of the Naval Yards;
7. the Naval Hospitals and the Hospital ships for French prisoners at Plymouth;
8. the Victualling and Cooperage at Plymouth;
9. the receipt and expenditure of stores at Plymouth;
10. Office of Treasurer of the Navy;
11. the issue of Money Bills;
12. the purchase Stores for the Naval Service more particularly Masts, Spars, Fir and Hemp

One of St Vincent's biographers put the findings of the commission succinctly "The valuable British oak rotted in the forests for want of the axe; the frames building rotted on the stocks for want of timber; the ships at sea rotted before their day because constructed of such worthless perishable materials."

=== Reform ===
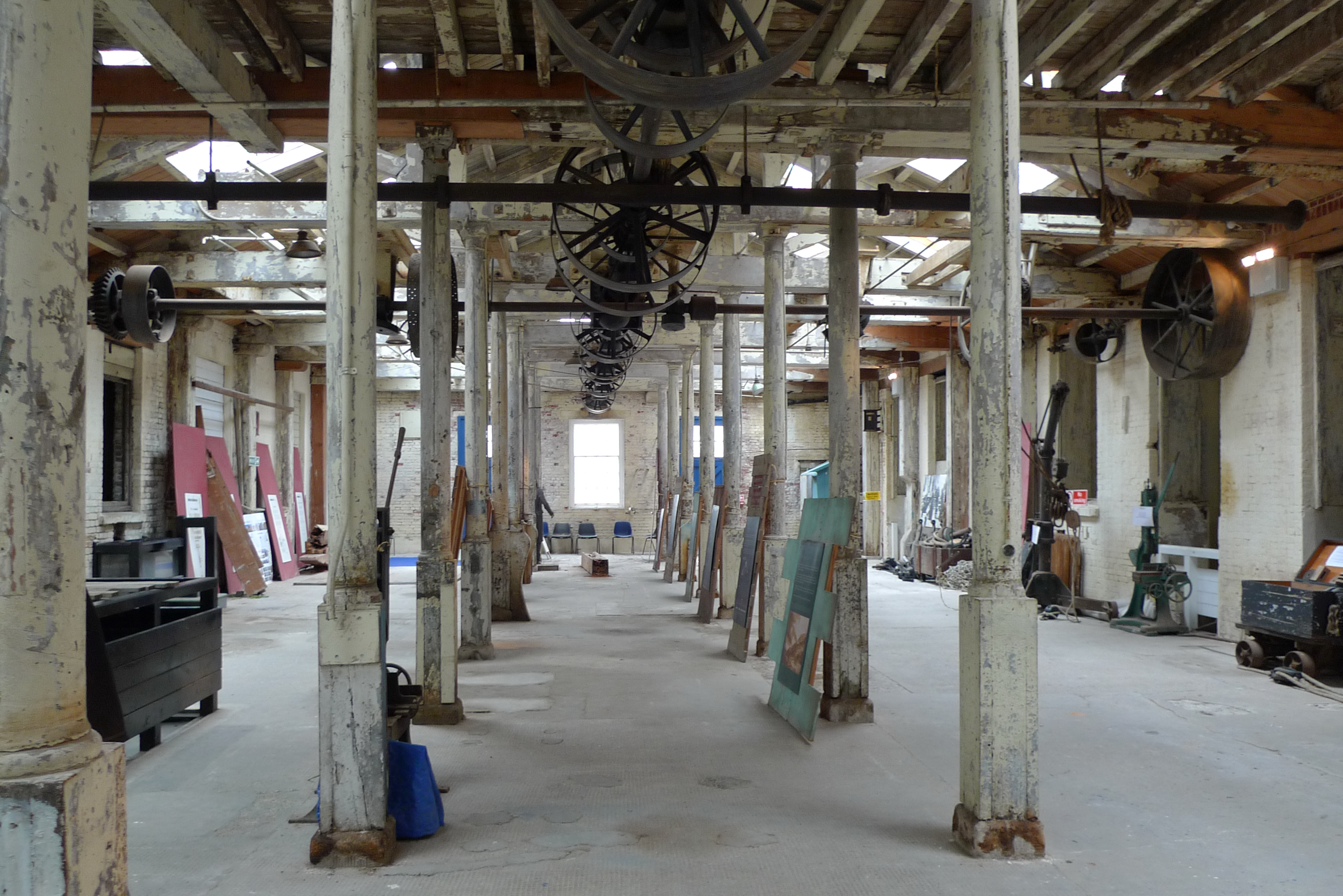
The Portsmouth Block Mills showing remaining overhead belt drive system.

One reform St Vincent did achieve was the introduction of block making machinery at the navy yard in Portsmouth. The machinery was designed by Marc Isambard Brunel and Samuel Bentham. By 1808 forty-five machines were turning out 130,000 pulley blocks per year. The innovation meant that only ten to thirty unskilled men were able to equal the output of 100 skilled blockmakers and the capital cost of the project was recovered in three years. The revolution of machinery enabled the Navy to become self-sufficient in regard to the production of the essential blocks.

This self-sufficiency removed a great deal of corruption, from external contractors producing inferior goods that jeopardised sailors' lives, to the corruption that arose from poorly paid officials responsible for awarding contracts and the bribes that might ensue. The buildings that housed the Block Machinery remain to this day and make up part of the Historic Portsmouth Dockyard.

As First Lord, St Vincent also determined to build a breakwater in Plymouth. The First Lord commissioned a civil engineer, John Rennie, and Joseph Whidbey, the former Master-Attendant at Woolwich dockyard, to design the breakwater. Work did not begin until 1811 but the earl is widely credited as the force behind its construction.

St Vincent spoke with the King regarding the contribution made by marines to the general service of the Navy and recommended to the King that the prefix "Royal" be added. These were the first official discussions into the retitling of the corps to Royal Marines.

During his tenure, the workers in the Royal dockyards demanded an increase in pay due to an increase in living costs. St Vincent reacted by dismissing the ringleaders and every man who had taken an active role in the strike. He eventually agreed to a small temporary allowance for the purchase of bread while the price of bread remained high.

St Vincent's gaze passed over every aspect of the Navy from the Sea Fencibles, civilian militias made up of merchant seamen using their own private or commercial vessels, but operating under letters of marque that authorised them to capture enemy ships should opportunity arise, to the Navy Hospitals. The earl attempted to disband the Sea Fencibles, claiming that they were needed only to quiet the fears of little old ladies and that good men passed their whole careers without hearing a shot fired. Doctor Baird, St Vincent's personal physician, was appointed to the Sick and Hurt Board as Inspector of all hospitals.

=== Powers to promote ===
Another burden of his promotion to First Lord of the Admiralty was that St Vincent was inundated with letters from aspiring officers and their relatives and friends. Soliciting employment from those in positions of influence in the navy had become common practice and was a generally accepted method of securing a good posting. The more influence that an officer could draw upon, the better and often more lucrative the position.

Also, due to the peace with France the navy had been reduced and employment was scarce. The First Lord could not, therefore, provide every officer of influence a position and was obliged to reject many of the letters that he received. Despite St Vincent having declared both publicly and privately that officers would be promoted or given position commensurate with their achievements and not based on their political or social influence, the letters continued to flow to the Admiralty.

The ways in which St Vincent chose to communicate the rejections often depended on the number of letters, the individual concerned, or the demands made by their respective well wishers. To the Earl of Portsmouth he wrote: "I cannot possibly agree in opinion with your Lordship, that a person sitting quietly by his fireside, and enjoying very nearly a sinecure, during such a war as we have been engaged in, has the same pretensions to promotion with the man who has exposed his person, and hazarded his constitution in every clime." A harsh rebuff to a peer of the realm. Yet to a lady of no discernible rank or influence he wrote: "Although I cannot admit the force of your argument in favour of Captain (name unknown) [sic.], there is something so amiable and laudable in a sister contending for the promotion of her brother that no apology was necessary for your letter of the 24th, which I lose no time in acknowledging."

Famously, when Commander Lord Cochrane captured the 32-gun Spanish frigate El Gamo in the 14-gun sloop HMS Speedy, a promotion was the usual reward for such a feat of skill and seamanship. It would be fair to argue that it would have been expected by both the commander and his friends and family. Unfortunately for Cochrane, the ship carrying the letter of that victory was intercepted and it was only received after he had himself been captured by the French and was facing a court-martial over the loss of his ship. A court-martial for losing one's ship was common practice at the time and in many cases, including Cochrane's, it was only a formality. It was only when Cochrane was cleared by the court that he could be promoted.

Unfortunately the commander thought that the First Lord had deliberately withheld the promotion due to an unforeseen grudge; he held this opinion for the rest of his life. Cochrane had many powerful friends and relatives who lobbied continuously on his behalf. These solicitations may have had a negative effect on Cochrane's career as it is possible that Jervis became irritated by them.

=== Resignation as First Lord ===
The detailed investigation into corruption that St Vincent began caused him to become extremely unpopular, as many influential men were involved in the various money-making schemes perpetrated. The board of inquiry set up by St Vincent was responsible for the impeachment of Henry Dundas, 1st Viscount Melville, the trusted lieutenant of British Prime Minister William Pitt and the most powerful politician in Scotland in the late 18th century, and his trial for misappropriation of public funds; Melville resigned. The House of Lords found Melville not guilty and he was acquitted of all charges.

St Vincent had thereby made an enemy of Pitt, who used the naval reform and its unpopularity to attack the First Lord and the Addington administration. St Vincent left the office on 14 May 1804 when Addington was replaced as prime minister by Pitt. Lord Howick, second son of St Vincent's friend Sir Charles Grey, came to his defence and, with the assistance of Charles James Fox, moved for a vote of thanks in the Commons for St Vincent's tireless efforts in naval reform in 1806.

On 14 May 1806, John Jeffery, one of the Members of Parliament for Poole, opened a parliamentary debate condemning St Vincent for "unprecedented neglect in building and repairing of ships while his Lordship presided at the Board of Admiralty and with delivering up the navy to his successor in a far less efficient state than that in which he received it". This motion was rejected and instead the Foreign Secretary, Charles James Fox, proposed a vote of thanks to Earl St Vincent, "That it appears to this house, that the conduct of the Earl of St. Vincent, in his late naval administration, has added an additional lustre to his exalted character, and is entitled to the approbation of this house."

Fox had said of St Vincent's appointment in 1801 "allow me to say, that I do not think it would be easy, if possible, to find a man in the whole community better suited, or more capable of the high office he fills, than the distinguished person at the head of the Admiralty – I mean the Earl of St Vincent." and had continued his support of the Earl throughout his time as first lord.

== Resumption of command ==
On 9 November 1805 St Vincent was promoted Admiral of the Red. He took command of the Channel Fleet once more in the 110-gun first-rate HMS Hibernia. During his tenure in command he spent much of his time at a house that he rented in the village of Rame. Once again he issued the orders that had become so effective in the Mediterranean and his previous Channel command. Once again these orders proved unpopular.

For a short time in 1806 he gave command of the Channel Fleet to his second-in-command Sir Charles Cotton in order that he might travel to Portugal on a particular mission. Portugal was under threat of invasion and St Vincent had been ordered, if necessary, to take the Portuguese court to its colony in Brazil. The invasion was delayed and St Vincent was recalled to the Channel Fleet. It was Sir Sidney Smith and Graham Moore who led the Royal family to safety in Brazil.

The Earl had always attempted to promote on merit rather than patronage and had become increasingly frustrated with the system of preferment by social rank and not competence. At his retirement in 1807 he had an audience with the King. The King asked if the navy were a better institution now than it had been on St Vincent's entrance into it. St Vincent replied that it was not. He stated: "Sire, I have always thought that a sprinkling of nobility was very desirable in the Navy, as it gives some sort of consequence to the service; but at present the Navy is so overrun by the younger branches of nobility, and the sons of Members of Parliament and they so swallow up all the patronage and so choke the channel to promotion, that the son of an old officer, however meritorious both their services may have been, has little or no chance of getting on." He continued on "I would rather promote the son of an old deserving Officer than of any noble in the land."

In a letter dated 18 October 1806 to Viscount Howick, then the First Lord, St Vincent wrote "If you will, my good Lord, bring a bill into Parliament to disqualify any Officer under the rank of Rear-Admiral to sit in the House of Commons, the Navy may be preserved; but while a little, drunken, worthless jackanapes is permitted to hold the seditious language he has done, in the presence of Flag-officers of rank, you will require a man of greater health and vigour than I possess to command your fleets."

St Vincent had long suffered from poor health and a change in government led to his resignation on 24 April 1807.

== Final years ==
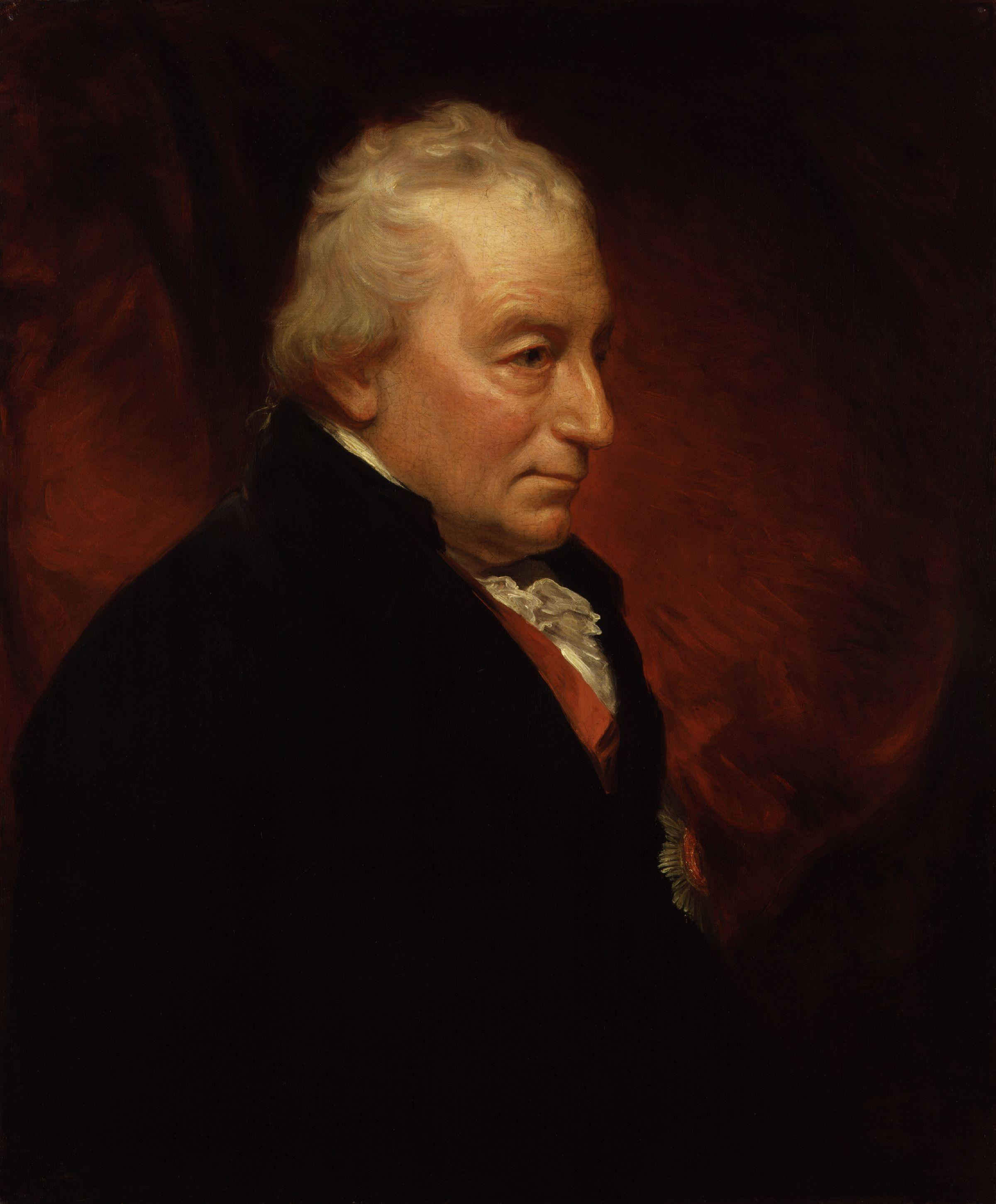
Earl St Vincent in retirement by Sir William Beechey

In his retirement he seldom took his seat in the House of Lords and made his last appearance in either 1810 or 1811. During these final years St Vincent gave generously to various charities, organisations and individuals. He donated £500 to the wounded and survivors of the Battle of Waterloo and £300 to relieve starvation in Ireland. St Vincent also donated £100 to the building of a Jewish chapel in Whitechapel, London.

In 1807, St Vincent, as a member of the House of Lords, opposed the proposed Slave Trade Act 1807, which would abolish British involvement in the Atlantic slave trade. He argued that if Britain were to abolish the slave trade, it would merely result in a transfer of British capital to other nations, and countered humanitarian criticisms of the trade by arguing the West Indies was a better place to live in comparison to Africa. St Vincent also argued that the vacuum left by the abolition of the trade would filled by France, potentially threatening Britain's naval supremacy. Despite this, the bill was successfully passed into law.

St Vincent also spoke in opposition to the Convention of Sintra and the Walcheren Campaign and then condemned its failure, although he conspicuously excluded the failure of its officers and men. St Vincent spoke in defence of Lieutenant-General Sir John Moore's retreat through Spain and Portugal and condemned the government and army commanders for failure to support him thoroughly.

In 1816 his wife Martha died at Rochetts in Essex. The couple had no children. In the winter of 1818–1819 St Vincent went to recover his health in France. When he arrived at Toulon he was greeted by Admiral Édouard Missiessy, who said of St Vincent that he was "as much the father of the French as of the English Navy".

=== Further honours ===
In 1800 St Vincent was made an honorary lieutenant-general of Marines and in 1814 was promoted to general.

In 1801 St Vincent had been created Viscount St Vincent of Meaford, Staffordshire. a title that because he had no children passed to his nephew, Edward Jervis Ricketts. In 1806 he was appointed as one of the thirty one elder brothers of Trinity House. The elder brothers, along with the master, form the court of Trinity House.

In 1809 St Vincent was honoured by John VI of Portugal who awarded him the Royal Portuguese Military Order of the Tower and Sword in order to commemorate the safe arrival of the Royal Family in Brazil, after Napoleon had invaded Portugal.

In May 1814 he was promoted to acting Admiral of the Fleet and commander-in-chief of the Channel Squadron. He was confirmed as Admiral of the Fleet on 19 July 1821 and George IV sent him a gold topped baton as a symbol of the office. The baton is currently held in the collections of the National Maritime Museum, Greenwich.

On 2 January 1815 he was made Knight Grand Cross of the Order of the Bath when the order was rearranged by the Prince Regent. Knight Grand Cross is the highest rank in the order.

=== Death and memorial ===
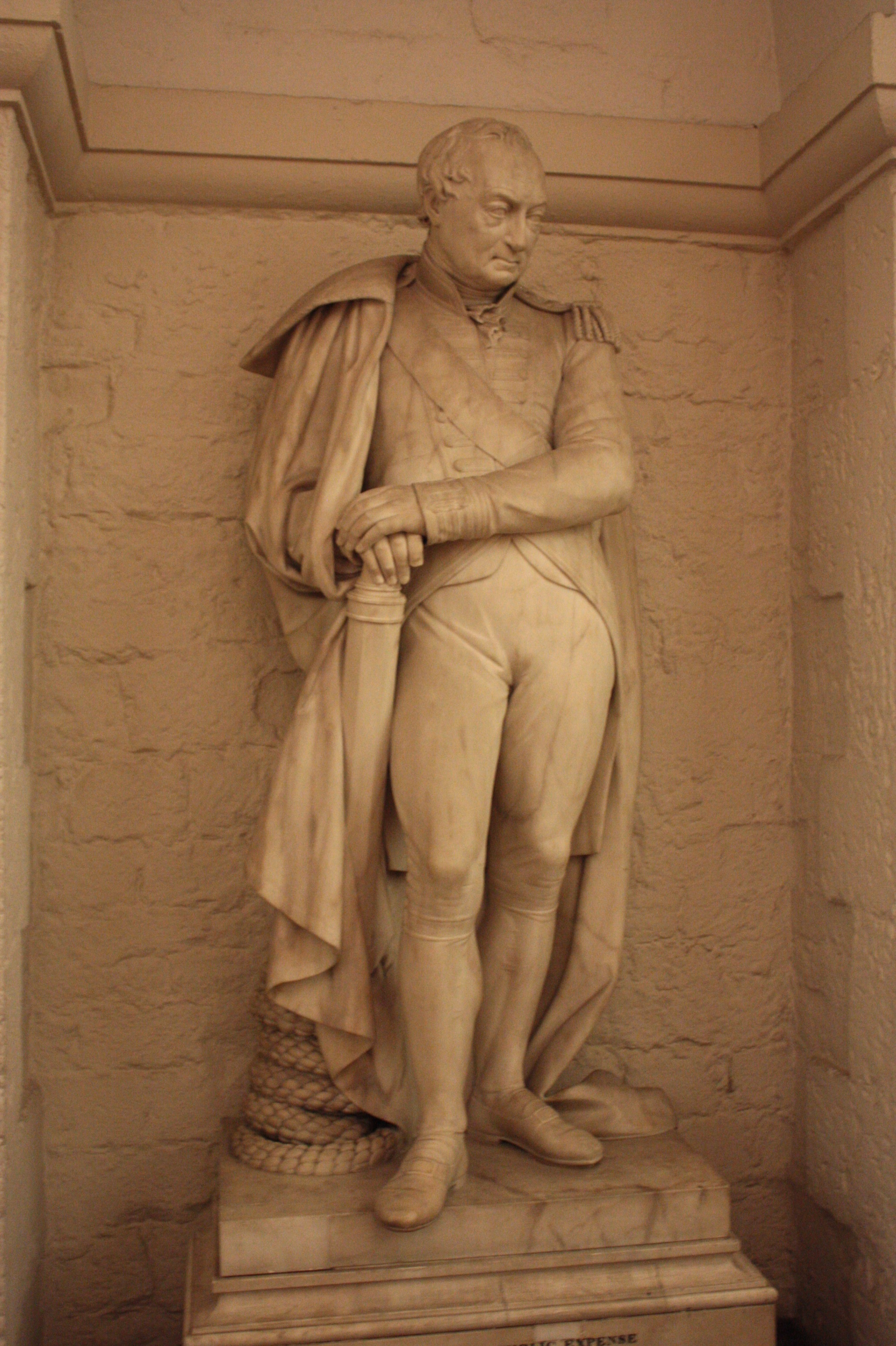
Memorial to John, Earl of St Vincent, in St Paul's Cathedral in London.

St Vincent died on 13 March 1823 and, because he had no children, the Barony of Jervis and the Earldom of St Vincent became extinct. His nephew, Edward Jervis Ricketts, became the 2nd Viscount St Vincent and changed his surname to Jervis, becoming Edward Jervis Jervis in honour of his uncle. St Vincent was buried at Stone, Staffordshire, in the family mausoleum, at his own request, and a monument was erected in the crypt of St. Paul's Cathedral.

=== Legacy ===
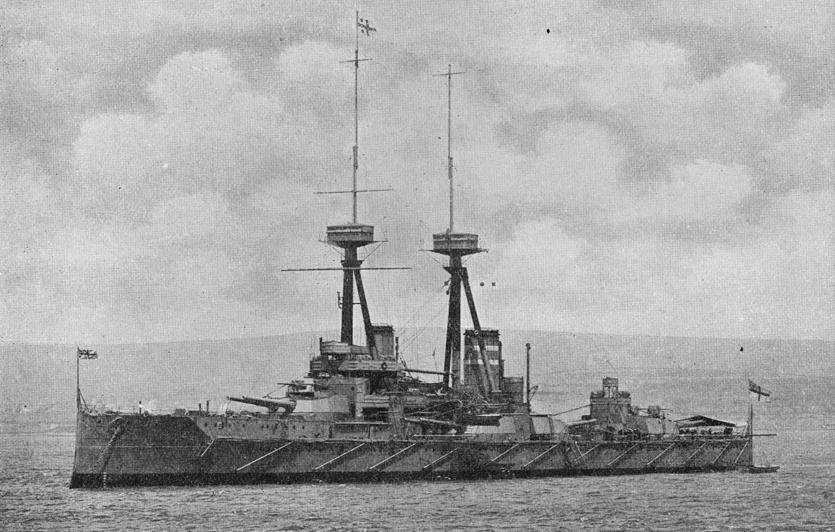
HMS St Vincent at the Coronation Review, Spithead, 24 June 1911

At least three ships and two stone frigates (or shore establishments) have been named HMS St Vincent, either in honour of the Earl or after that battle that he won. HMS St Vincent, commissioned in 1910, was the first of her class and therefore the class of battleship was named after her. The St Vincent-class battleships included HMS Collingwood and HMS Vanguard. Jervis, a J-class destroyer, launched just prior to the Second World War, was named after the admiral. HMS Jervis served throughout the war. She was known as a lucky ship as, despite taking part in several actions, she never lost a man to enemy fire.

Jervis has also been remembered in schools in England. He has a boarding house (Saint Vincent) named in his honour at the Royal Hospital School in Holbrook, Suffolk. St Vincent College in Gosport, England, is named after the admiral's most famous battle.

As with many other officers during the great age of discovery there are several areas of the world named in the earl's honour. Cape Jervis and Gulf St Vincent, South Australia, and Jervis Bay, New South Wales, Australia were named for him as was the town of Vincentia and Jervis Bay National Park. The County of St Vincent, New South Wales was also named in his honour. Jervis Inlet, in British Columbia, Canada, was also named for him.

Jervis appears as a fictional character in two Horatio Hornblower novels, Hornblower and the Atropos and Lord Hornblower, as well as several books of the Aubrey–Maturin series by Patrick O'Brian.

== Historiography ==
Though Jervis clearly had a strong impact during the Napoleonic Wars and afterwards on the development of the Navy, few contemporary biographies of Jervis are available, and those are seriously lacking in breadth and thoroughness. The most recent work related to Jervis is The Remaking of the English Navy by Admiral St. Vincent: The Great Unclaimed Naval Revolution by Charles Arthur, 1986, but this focused more on Jervis's reforms to the docks, and less to other parts of his life. Evelyn Berkman's Nelson's Dear Lord: Portrait of St. Vincent (1962), as the bibliographer Eugene Rasor points out, is merely an "effort" to create a biography. The same bibliographer says much the same about William James's "Old Oak": The Life of John Jervis, Earl St. Vincent (1950) and Owen Sherrard's A Life of Lord St. Vincent (1933), pointing to both as mediocre. Ruddock Mackay wrote an article which documented the early life of Jervis.

== See also ==
- St Vincent Squadron

== Bibliography ==
- Andidora, Ronald (2000). Iron Admirals: Naval Leadership in the Twentieth Century. Greenwood Publishing Group. ISBN 978-0-313-31266-3.
- Berckman, Evelyn (1962). Nelson's Dear Lord: A Portrait of St. Vincent. London: Macmillan.
- Brenton, Edward Pelham (1838). Life and Correspondence of John, Earl of St Vincent, G. C. B., Admiral of the Fleet. Vol. 1. Henry Colburn. OCLC 464467577. Reprint: ISBN 9780598397638.
- Brenton, Edward Pelham (1838). Life and Correspondence of John, Earl of St Vincent, G. C. B., Admiral of the Fleet. Vol. 2. Henry Colburn. OCLC 464467577.
- The Naval Chronicle. Vol. 04. Bunney & Gold. OCLC 1759531.
- The Naval Chronicle. Vol. 11. Bunney & Gold. OCLC 1759531.
- The Naval Chronicle. Vol. 13. Bunney & Gold. OCLC 1759531.
- The Naval Chronicle. Vol. 15. Bunney & Gold. OCLC 1759531.
- Coleman, Terry (2001). Nelson: The man and the legend. Bloomsbury. ISBN 978-0-7475-5900-9.
- Crimmin, P. K. (5 January 2006). "Jervis, John, earl of St Vincent". Oxford Dictionary of National Biography (Online ed.). doi:10.1093/ref:odnb/14794. ISBN 978-0-19-861412-8.
- Grundner, Tom (2007). The Ramage Companion. Fireship Press. ISBN 978-1-934757-05-5.
- Lavery, Brian (1983). The Ship of the Line Volume 1. Conway Maritime Press. ISBN 978-0-85177-252-3.
- The Life of Nelson, Volume 1 (of 2) by A. T. Mahan at Project Gutenberg
- Marcus, Geoffrey (1971). The Age of Nelson, The Royal Navy 1793–1815. Viking Adult. ISBN 978-0-670-10965-4.
- Moseley, Brian (26 February 2013). "Plymouth Breakwater". The Encyclopaedia of Plymouth History. Plymouth, UK: Plymouthdata Info. Archived from the original on 17 May 2013.
- Palmer, Michael (2005). Command at sea: naval command and control since the sixteenth century. President and Fellows of Harvard College. ISBN 978-0-674-01681-1.
- Ralfe, J. (1828). Naval Biography of Great Britain, Volume 1. Whitemore & Fenn. OCLC 310957964.
- Tucker, Jedediah Stephens (1844). Admiral the Right Hon The Earl of St Vincent GCB &C. Memoirs. Vol. 1. Richard Bentley, New Burlington Street. OCLC 6083815. Reprint: ISBN 9780598397638.
- Tucker, Jedediah Stephens (1844). Admiral the Right Hon The Earl of St Vincent GCB &C. Memoirs. Vol. 2. Richard Bentley, New Burlington Street. OCLC 6083815.
- Vale, Brian (2004). The Audacious Admiral Cochrane: The True Life of a Naval Legend. Conway Maritime Press. pp. 34–37. ISBN 978-0-85177-986-7.
- Winfield, Rif (2007). British Warships in the Age of Sail 1714–1792: Design, Construction, Careers and Fates. Seaforth Publishing. ISBN 978-1-84415-700-6.
- Guerres maritimes sous la république et l'empire, Jean Pierre Edmond Jurien de La Gravière, Pierre Charles Jean Baptiste Silvestre de Villeneuve, Charpentier, 1860 Tome 1, pp. 101–119
- Letters of Admiral of the fleet, the John Jervis, Earl of St. Vincent whilst the first lord of the Admiralty, 1801–1804, edited by David Bonner-Smith. Publications of the Navy Records Society, vols. 55, 61 ([London]: Printed for the Navy Records Society, 1922–27).

Military offices
Preceded by Alan Gardner	Commander-in-Chief, Leeward Islands Station; 1793–1794	Succeeded by Benjamin Caldwell
Preceded by Lord Hotham	Commander-in-Chief, Mediterranean Fleet; 1796–1799	Succeeded by Viscount Keith
Parliament of Great Britain
Preceded by Thomas Bowlby; Charles Perceval	Member of Parliament for Launceston; 1783–1784; With: Charles Perceval	Succeeded by Charles Perceval; George Rose
Preceded by Charles Townshend; Richard Walpole	Member of Parliament for Great Yarmouth; 1784–1790; With: Henry Beaufoy	Succeeded by Henry Beaufoy; Charles Townshend
Preceded by Robert Waller; Earl Wycombe	Member of Parliament for Wycombe; 1790–1794; With: Earl Wycombe	Succeeded by Earl Wycombe; Francis Baring, Bt
Political offices
Preceded by The Earl Spencer	First Lord of the Admiralty; 1801–1804	Succeeded by The Viscount Melville
Peerage of the United Kingdom
New creation	Viscount St Vincent; 1801–1823	Succeeded by Edward Jervis
