= Listed buildings in Stone Rural =

Stone Rural is a civil parish in the Borough of Stafford, Staffordshire, England. It contains 39 listed buildings that are recorded in the National Heritage List for England. Of these, three are at Grade II*, the middle of the three grades, and the others are at Grade II, the lowest grade. The parish contains areas around the town of Stone and includes the villages of Aston-By-Stone to the south, and Meaford, Moddershall, and Oulton to the south. The Trent and Mersey Canal runs through the parish, and the listed buildings associated with this are two bridges and two mileposts. The Moddershall Valley contained a number of watermills and what remains of some of these are listed. Most of the other listed buildings are houses and cottages and associated structures, farmhouses and farm buildings, and the rest of the listed buildings include churches, and a house later used as an abbey. The listed buildings within the town of Stone are in Listed buildings in Stone, Staffordshire.

== Key ==
Grade	Criteria
II*	Particularly important buildings of more than special interest
II	Buildings of national importance and special interest

== Buildings ==
Name and location	Photograph	Date	Notes	Grade
Meaford Old Hall Farmhouse; 52.91587°N 2.16096°W	—	Late 16th century	Most of the farmhouse dates from the 17th century, and there were later extensions. It is partly timber framed and partly in brick on a stone plinth, and some of the timber framings with wattle and daub infill is exposed. The farmhouse is partly in two storeys, and partly in one storey with an attic. There are two doorways with plain surrounds and cambered heads, and the windows are casements.	II
Yew Tree Cottage, Aston-By-Stone; 52.87870°N 2.12662°W	—	Early 17th century	The house was later extended. The original part is timber framed with plaster infill, and has two storeys and an attic, and an overhanging gable. It contains three-light casement windows, and an ornamental tie beam. To the left is a later wing in rendered brick with one storey and an attic, and a gabled porch. The roofs are tiled.	II
The Old Schoolhouse, Oulton; 52.91908°N 2.13672°W	—	17th century	The former school is in stone with a tile roof, a single storey, and two bays. In the centre is a doorway that is flanked by three-light mullioned windows, all under a continuous hood mould.	II
Willow Cottage Farmhouse, Aston-By-Stone; 52.88035°N 2.12751°W	—	17th century	The cottage is in timber framing and painted brick, and has a thatched roof. There is one storey and an attic, and three bays. On the front and rear are gabled porches, the windows are casements with cambered heads, and there is exposed timber framing on the south gable end and at the rear.	II
The Nursery House, Meaford Hall; 52.91758°N 2.16651°W	—	Early 18th century	The mansion was remodelled in 1874–77. The nursery house is in stone with a parapet and a tile roof with coped gable ends. There are two storeys and four bays. The doorway has been reconstructed using the original pilasters that have foliated capitals. It has a cornice, above which is a shell ornament and an inscribed plaque. In the ground floor, the windows are sashes, and the upper floor contains small-paned casement windows.	II*
Ivy Mill and Ivy Cottage; 52.91626°N 2.12632°W		c. 1740	The watermill and cottage are in painted brick and have tile roofs. The mill has three storeys, it is approached by a bridge, and entered through a door in the middle floor. The windows are casements, and at the rear is a waterwheel 19 feet (5.8 m) in diameter and 6 feet (1.8 m) wide. The cottage also has three storeys, a lean-to, and a tiled porch, and most of the windows are casements.	II
Gate piers, Aston Hall; 52.88352°N 2.12873°W	—	18th century	The gate piers flanking the entrance to the hall are in rendered stone. Each pier has a moulded cornice cap. and a finial consisting of an urn surmounted by a ball.	II
Ivy Mill Cottage; 52.91609°N 2.12632°W	—	18th century (probable)	The cottage, which has been altered and extended, is in painted brick with a tile roof. There are two storeys, three bays, the right bay added later, and a single-storey extension to the left. The doorway has a plain surround, and the windows are casements.	II
Knell Farmhouse; 52.93769°N 2.11798°W	—	18th century	The farmhouse is in red brick and has a tile roof with stone-coped gable ends. There are two parallel three-storey ranges and a projecting two-storey wing. Most of the windows are casements, and there is a modern bow window.	II
Knenhall House Farmhouse; 52.93647°N 2.11760°W	—	18th century	A red brick farmhouse with a string course and a tile roof. There are two storeys and an attic, two bays, and two lower two-storey extensions to the right. The doorway has a plain surround and a tiled hood on brackets, and the windows are casements.	II
Oulton Old Hall; 52.91862°N 2.13870°W	—	18th century	The house, which has a 17th-century core, is in red brick and stone and has a band and a hipped slate roof. There are three storeys and an attic, and seven bays. On the front is a stone Roman Doric portico, the windows on the front are casements, and elsewhere there are three-light mullioned windows.	II
Mausoleum, Aston Hall; 52.88122°N 2.12945°W	—	c. 1767	The mausoleum is in stone. The central block has a moulded pediment, a doorway with a moulded architrave and a keyblock, a pulvinated frieze, and a segmental pediment. It is flanked by rusticated bays, each with a moulded cornice and a niche.	II
Bridge No. 99, (Siddall's Bridge); 52.92068°N 2.16299°W		Late 18th century	An accommodation bridge over the Trent and Mersey Canal, it is in red brick with stone coping, and repairs in engineering brick. The bridge consists of a single segmental arch with voussoirs and swept wings ending in piers at the four corners.	II
Prospect House; 52.92276°N 2.11150°W	—	Late 18th century	The house, which was later extended, is in red brick with dentilled eaves and a tile roof. There are two storeys, two bays, a lower two-storey three-bay extension to the left, and an attached outbuilding. On the front are two gabled porches, the original doorway has a rectangular fanlight, and the windows are casements.	II
Splashy Mill; 52.92699°N 2.12093°W		Late 18th or early 19th century	A disused bone grinding watermill, it is in brick and has five storeys. Originally a double mill, one of the sheds remains, which contains an overshot waterwheel, the housing for a second wheel, and two grinding pans. On the west side is a single-storey extension.	II
Bridge No. 100 (Turnover Bridge); 52.92466°N 2.16254°W		c. 1818	A roving bridge over the Trent and Mersey Canal, it is in red brick and consists of a single elliptical arch. The bridge has stone saddleback copings on the parapets, which are swept down on the south side. here are ramps down to the towpath.	II
Canal Milepost near Aston Lock; 52.88461°N 2.12494°W		1819	The milepost is in the towpath of the Trent and Mersey Canal. It is in cast iron, and consists of a circular post with a moulded head, carrying two convex tablets with the distances to Preston Brook and Shardlow.	II
Canal Milepost near Top Lock Bridge; 52.91840°N 2.16287°W		1819	The milepost is in the towpath of the Trent and Mersey Canal. It is in cast iron, and consists of a circular post with a moulded head, carrying two convex tablets with the distances to Preston Brook and Shardlow.	II
1 and 3 Abbey Cottages; 52.91851°N 2.13805°W	—	Early 19th century	A pair of red brick cottages on a stone plinth with a tile roof, at right angles to the street. They have two storeys, a front of four bays, one bay facing the street, and a rounded bay on the corner. Facing the street is a doorway with a plain surround and a cornice hood on brackets, and the windows are casements.	II
Office building, Boulton Brothers; 52.92499°N 2.11144°W	—	Early 19th century	The building is in red brick with a moulded eaves cornice and a tile roof. There are two storeys and four bays. On the front is a small gabled porch, the doorway has pilasters, and the windows are casements with projecting keystones.	II
Grove House; 52.91704°N 2.12579°W	—	Early 19th century	The house is in painted brick on a stone plinth, with projecting scalloped eaves, and a slate roof with ornamental bargeboards. There are two storeys and three bays. The central doorway has a moulded surround, pilasters, a rectangular fanlight, and a small cornice hood. The windows are sashes with plain lintels.	II
Hayes Mill; 52.91286°N 2.13250°W		Early 19th century	A bone grinding watermill, it is in brick with tile roofs and an irregular plan. The main building has two storeys, and contains machinery, including drive shafts, two grinding pans, and a disused overshot waterwheel.	II
Calcining kilns, Ivy Mill; 52.91636°N 2.12607°W	—	Early 19th century (probable)	There are two calcining kilns in brick. At the front is a brick retaining wall with two semicircular-headed kiln mouths, and the whole is covered by an open-fronted structure in brick and concrete.	II
Mosty Lea Mill; 52.92346°N 2.12390°W		Early 19th century	A former bone grinding watermill, it is in red brick with a tile roof. The main mill building has two storeys and is built into a slope. It contains an iron and wood undershot waterwheel 20 feet (6.1 m) in diameter and two grinding pans.	II
Outlanes Mill Farmhouse; 52.91930°N 2.15395°W	—	Early 19th century	A red brick farmhouse with a hipped slate roof, two storeys, and three bays. The central doorway has a rectangular fanlight and a stone cornice hood, and is flanked by later canted bay windows. The other windows are sashes with plain lintels.	II
The Manor House, Meaford Hall; 52.91791°N 2.16662°W	—	c. 1830	The house, which is in Jacobean style, was altered and restored in 1874–77. It is in stone with moulded cornices over the ground floor and at the eaves, a parapet, and a tile roof with coped and stepped gable ends. There are three storeys, and five bays. The central doorway has panelled pilasters with foliated capitals, a frieze with three escutcheons, and a cornice with urns. The windows are sashes, those in the ground floor with elaborate strapwork entablatures. On the garden front are two bay windows tiered over two storeys, one canted and the other bowed, a dormer with a semicircular pediment and a shell ornament, and a pierced parapet.	II*
The Hayes House; 52.91259°N 2.12918°W	—	Early to mid 19th century	A large rendered house with pilasters, and a hipped slate roof. There are two storeys and nine bays, the middle three bays projecting under an open pediment. On the front is a Doric porte-cochère. The garden front contains a three-light canted bay window tiered over two storeys, and a five-light single-storey bow window. On the roof is an ornate stair lantern.	II
Former stables, Hayes House; 52.91268°N 2.12862°W	—	Early to mid 19th century	The stables are in red brick and mainly with one storey. In the centre is a block of one storey and an attic, that has a pediment with a modillioned cornice, under which are relieving round-headed arches containing windows.	II
St Mary's Abbey; 52.91769°N 2.13752°W		c. 1840	The house was extended in 1913, and used as an abbey. It is built in red brick with stone dressings and has slate roofs with stone coped parapeted gable ends and parapets. There are two storeys and attics, and a front of ten bays. The five bays at the left include two gabled bays containing two-storey bay windows, and between them is a two-storey porch that has a doorway with a four-centred arch. The bay at the right end is also gabled with a two-storey bay window. At the rear are three-storey ranges around a courtyard with a carriage arch flanked by lodges.	II
St Saviour's Church, Aston-By-Stone; 52.88414°N 2.12819°W		1846	The church was designed by James Trubshaw in Gothic style, and the steeple was added in 1870. It is in stone with a slate roof, and consists of a nave, a chancel. and a northwest steeple. The steeple has a tower and a broach spire.	II
Bridge No. 102 (Meafordhall Farm Bridge); 52.93506°N 2.16827°W		Mid 19th century (probable)	The bridge carries a bridleway over the Trent and Mersey Canal. It is in brick with stone coping, and consists of a single elliptical arch with a hump back. The bridge has quoins, a string course with a dentilled band below it, stone plaques, and swept wings ending in four piers at the corners.	II
Lodge, Hayes House; 52.91265°N 2.13124°W	—	Mid 19th century	The lodge at the entrance to the drive is in engraved stucco on a stone plinth, and has a slate roof. There is one storey, and an L-shaped plan with a projecting gabled one-bay wing on the right. The angled porch has a cornice hood, and the doorway has a plain surround.	II
Chimney, Ivy Mill; 52.91618°N 2.12638°W		Mid 19th century (probable)	The chimney serving the watermill is in dark red brick on a stone base. It is polygonal and 60 feet (18 m) high.	II
Chapel, St Mary's Abbey; 52.91788°N 2.13791°W	—	1854	The Roman Catholic chapel was designed by E. W. Pugin in Decorated style, and the chapter house and sacristy were added in 1892. The chapel is in stone, and consists of a nave, a lower chancel, a chapter house, and a sacristy.	II*
Aston Hall; 52.88255°N 2.12805°W	—	1855	The house was designed by E. W. Pugin and incorporates earlier material by C. F. Hansom. It is built in red brick with stone dressings, decoration in white and blue brick, and tile roofs. The house has two storeys and attics. Most of the windows are casements, there are some lancet windows, and gabled dormers with decorative bargeboards and mace finials. Features include a projecting gabled wing containing a two-storey canted bay window, a niche containing a statue of a saint, and a turret, square in the lower part and octagonal above.	II
Parker Jervis Mausoleum; 52.88422°N 2.12765°W	—	1864	The mausoleum is in the churchyard of St Saviour's Church. It is in Hollington sandstone, and has a rectangular plan. The mausoleum has a moulded cornice in Doric style, and a blocking course concealing the roof, and it contains a doorway with a plain lintel.	II
Former stables, Meaford Hall; 52.91757°N 2.16591°W	—	1865	The stables are in red brick with stone dressings, quoins, sprocket eaves, and tile roofs. They have one storey and attics, and form three ranges around a courtyard. In the middle of the centre range is a gatehouse with a carriage arch, a clock, and a weathervane, and elsewhere are doorways with keystones, casement windows, and gabled dormers.	II
Church of Holy Michael Archangel, Aston-by-Stone; 52.88318°N 2.12852°W	—	c. 1882	A Roman Catholic church possibly designed by James Trubshaw and incorporating material from a church of 1847–49 by C. F. Hansom. It is built in sandstone with a tile roof, and consists of a nave, a chancel, and a northwest vestry. A sanctus bell tower was added in 1899, and inside there is a west gallery.	II
Presbytery, St Mary's Abbey; 52.91803°N 2.13805°W	—	1892	The presbytery is in stone, and has a tile roof with coped gables and apex crosses. There are two storeys and a front of three bays. The left bay forms a projecting gabled cross-wing, the right bay has a smaller gable and a projecting single-bay extension, and in the middle bay is a porch with a lean-to canopy, and a triangular dormer above. The windows are in Gothic style.	II
