= Meaford =

Meaford may refer to:

- Meaford, Ontario, Canada
- Meaford, Staffordshire, England
- Meaford Hall, Staffordshire, England
- Meaford Power Station, England
