= Aston-by-Stone railway station =

Disused railway station in Aston, Staffordshire

Aston-by-Stone
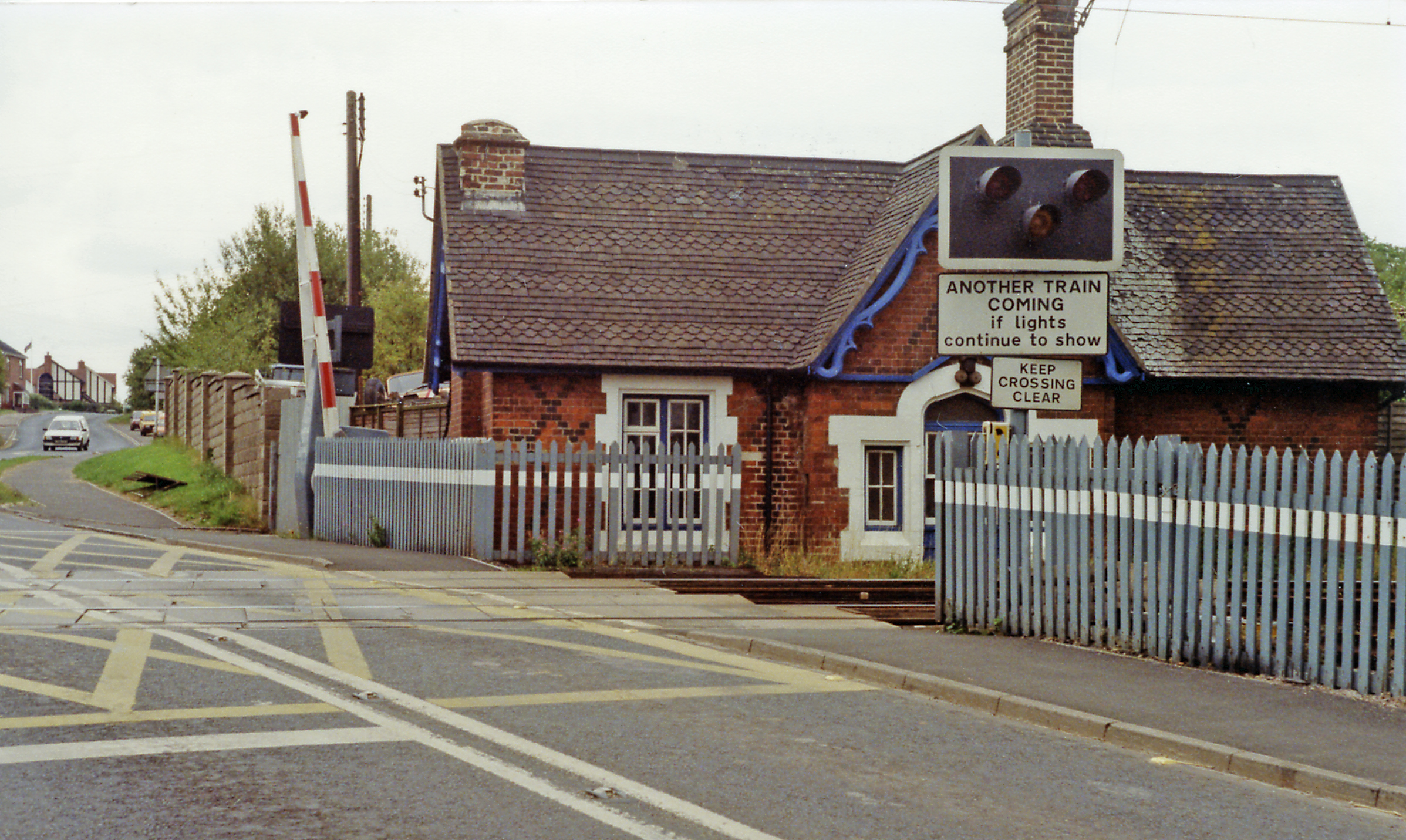
- The remains of the station (1990)

General information
- Location: Aston-by-Stone, Stafford; England
- Coordinates: 52.8913°N 2.1247°W
- Grid reference: SJ916327
- Platforms: 2

Other information
- Status: Disused

History
- Original company: North Staffordshire Railway
- Post-grouping: London, Midland and Scottish Railway

Key dates
- 1 November 1901: Station opened
- 6 January 1947: Station closed
Location

Aston-by-Stone railway station is a disused railway station in the village of Aston, Staffordshire, England.

== History ==
Opened by the North Staffordshire Railway, it became part of the London, Midland and Scottish Railway during the Grouping of 1923. The station closed in 1947

== The site today ==
Trains still pass on the now electrified West Coast Main Line.

Preceding station	Historical railways	Following station
Stone Line and station open	North Staffordshire Railway Stone to Colwich Line	Sandon Line open, station closed
