= Listed buildings in Stone, Staffordshire =

Stone is a civil parish in the Borough of Stafford, Staffordshire, England. It contains 75 listed buildings that are recorded in the National Heritage List for England. Of these, six are at Grade II*, the middle of the three grades, and the others are at Grade II, the lowest grade. Stone is a market town, and most of its listed buddings are houses and cottages, shops, offices, and public houses. The Trent and Mersey Canal passes through the town, and the listed buildings associated with this are bridges, locks, a warehouse, a milepost and items in the boatyard. The other listed buildings include churches and structures in churchyards, road bridges, former mills, a former hospital, a milestone, a railway station and other buildings associated with the railway, schools, and a war memorial. The listed buildings in the rural areas around the town of Stone are in Listed buildings in Stone Rural.

== Key ==
| Grade | Criteria |
|---|---|
| II* | Particularly important buildings of more than special interest |
| II | Buildings of national importance and special interest |

== Buildings ==
| Name and location | Photograph | Date | Notes | Grade |
|---|---|---|---|---|
| Walton Bridge; 52.89804°N 2.14693°W | | Medieval | The bridge was largely rebuilt in the 17th or 18th century, and was superseded by a new bridge to the west in 1984. The bridge carries a road over the River Trent, and is in stone. It consists of two main arches, with four flood arches to the north and one to the south. The arches have segmental or segmental-pointed heads, and there are four triangular cutwaters to the east and five to the west. The bridge has a band over the arches, and plain parapets. It is about 60 metres (200 ft) long and 5 metres (16 ft) wide. | II |
| Walton House and walls, 71 Stafford Road; 52.89559°N 2.14649°W | — | 16th century (probable) | The house was later altered, and a rear wing was added in the 19th century. It has a timber framed core, cladding in red brick with stone dressings, on a stone plinth, with a sill band, a top cornice, and a roof of slate and tile. The house is in Georgian style, and has three storeys, a double depth plan, and a front range of four bays, and at the rear is a timber framed stair wing and two other wings. The doorway has fluted Tuscan pilasters, an entablature, and a pediment. The windows are sashes; in the outer bays of the ground floor they are tripartite with Tuscan colonettes, a frieze and a cornice. The other window in the ground floor and those in the middle floor have wedge lintel with ogee shaping, scrolls and acanthus decoration. Inside, there is exposed timber framing, and attached to the house are two stone-coped walls. | II* |
| Crompton Tomb; 52.90150°N 2.14430°W | | Early 17th century | The tomb of William Crompton and his wife is in the churchyard of St Michael's Church. It is a chest tomb, with architraved panels and armorial motifs on the sides. On the top are the effigies of a man in armour and a woman in a dress, and the tomb is enclosed by cast iron railings. | II* |
| Three Crowns Public House; 52.89093°N 2.12609°W | | 17th century (probable) | The original part of the public house is timber framed with plaster cladding and a thatched roof. There is one storey and an attic, a two-bay range and a cross-wing, an outshut to the right, and two rear gabled wings. The windows are casements, there is an oriel window, and two eyebrow dormers. Inside, there is exposed timber framing. At the rear is a large 20th-century extension. | II |
| Cumberland House, 8 High Street; 52.90162°N 2.14589°W | | Early to mid 18th century | A house, later used for other purposes, it is stuccoed on a moulded plinth, with rusticated end pilasters, a top entablature with a pulvinated frieze, and a tile roof. It is in Georgian style, with three storeys, a double depth plan, a symmetrical front of five bays, and two rear wings with coped gables. In the centre is a porch that has Doric half-columns with fluted capitals and an Ionic entablature, and the doorway has a rectangular fanlight. The windows are sashes. | II |
| The Priory, 8 Lichfield Street; 52.90136°N 2.14401°W | — | Early to mid 18th century | The house, which is built on the site of a previous priory, was altered and extended in the 19th century, and it incorporates a 13th–14th century undercroft. The house has a timber framed core, external walls in stuccoed brick, and a hipped roof. There are three storeys, an L-shaped plan, and a front of three bays. Steps flanked by parapets ending in panelled piers lead up to the central doorway that has a porch with Doric columns. To its left is a canted bay window, the other windows are sashes, the window in the right bay of the ground floor being tripartite. Inside the house is exposed timber framing, and the undercroft is rib vaulted. | II* |
| Coppice Mill; 52.90967°N 2.13796°W | | Mid 18th century (probable) | Originally a paper mill, it was converted into a flint mill in about 1840, and is in brick with some stone dressings, a modillioned cornice, and a tile roof. The mill has a single storey, and a waterwheel on the right return. The left part of the front is open with a brick pier, and to the right is a segmental-headed entrance. | II |
| Sundial; 52.90176°N 2.14397°W | — | 18th century | The sundial is in the churchyard of St Michael's Church, and was restored in 1958. It is in stone and consists of a baluster on two round steps, with a round cap showing signs of a round plate and an inscription. | II |
| Wall east of St Michael's Church; 52.90190°N 2.14258°W | — | 18th century | The wall is a rebuild of an earlier wall and was altered later. It is in brick and stone, and encloses the churchyard on its east side. | II |
| Wall and gatepier north and northwest of St Michael's Church; 52.90191°N 2.14374°W | — | 18th century | The wall is a rebuild of an earlier wall and was altered later. It is mainly in brick with some stone footings and coping, and encloses the churchyard on its north and northwest sides. To the north of the church tower is a round-headed entrance with a cornice and the base of an urn. The gate pier to the left of the west entrance to the churchyard is in stone and dates from the 19th century. It has chamfered angles, a cornice with acanthus moulding, and a cap with a pine finial. | II |
| Wall south and southwest of St Michael's Church; 52.90085°N 2.14354°W | — | 18th century | The wall is a rebuild of an earlier wall and was altered later. The wall to the south of the churchyard is mainly in stone, and elsewhere, including where it runs along the boundaries of The Priory and Mansion House, it is mainly in brick. | II |
| Former Warehouse; 52.90019°N 2.14506°W | — | 18th century | The warehouse, formerly serving the Trent and Mersey Canal, and later converted for residential use, is in brick with modillioned eaves and slate roofs. It consists of two parallel three-storey ranges, and a square extension to the east with a pyramidal roof. The front facing the canal contains segmental-headed boat holes, and the other openings include loading doors, segmental-headed windows, and a roundel. | II |
| St Michael's Church; 52.90168°N 2.14324°W | | 1758 | The chancel was built in 1887 and is in Perpendicular style, while the rest of the church is early Gothic Revival. The church is built in stone, the chancel roof is tiled, and the rest of the church has a copper clad roof. It consists of a nave, a chancel with a north vestry and a south organ loft, and a west tower embraced by porches. The tower has four stages, a west doorway with a pointed head, a quatrefoil window, round clock faces, a top lozenge frieze, and an embattled parapet with corner pinnacles and weathervanes. The body of the church also has embattled parapets and crocketed corner pinnacles, and there are two tiers of windows along the nave containing Y-tracery. | II* |
| Jervis Mausoleum; 52.90173°N 2.14284°W | | c. 1760 (probable) | The mausoleum is in the churchyard of St Michael's Church to the east of the church, and is to the memory of members of the Jervis family. It is in stone with a lead roof, in Classical style, and consists of a rectangular pedimented call flanked by lower rusticated wings with cornices. The central doorway has an architrave, a keystone and a pediment. On the sides of the wings are niches. | II* |
| 5 and 7 High Street; 52.90156°N 2.14530°W | — | Mid to late 18th century | A pair of brick shops, stuccoed on the front, with quoins, a top cornice, and a tile roof with stone coped gables. There are three storeys, four bays, and two rear gabled wings. In the ground floor is a 20th-century shop front with fluted pilasters, a frieze and a cornice, and small-paned windows, and at the right end is a round-headed entry. Two of the windows are casements and the others are sashes, all with moulded surrounds. | II |
| 15 High Street; 52.90176°N 2.14580°W | — | Mid to late 18th century | A brick shop with a top moulded cornice and a tile roof. It is in Georgian style, and has three storeys, five bays, and a gabled wing at the rear. In the left bay is a carriage entrance with a Tudor arch, in the right bay is a round-headed entry, and between them is a 20th-century shop front. The windows are sashes with moulded surrounds, those in the middle floor with cambered heads, and in the top floor with segmental heads. | II |
| 48 High Street; 52.90191°N 2.14654°W | — | Mid to late 18th century | A brick shop with a modillioned cornice and a tile roof. There are three storeys and two bays, and at the rear is a small wing and a larger later extension. In the ground floor is a 20th-century shop front, and the upper floors contain small-pane casement windows, in the middle floor with cambered heads, and in the top floor with segmental heads. | II |
| 10, 12 and 16 Stafford Street; 52.90090°N 2.14572°W | — | Mid to late 18th century | A row of four brick shops with a top cornice and a tile roof. There are three storeys and four bays. To the left are two shop fronts, and the doorways to the right have cambered heads. The windows are casements, most of those in the lower two floors with cambered heads, and those at the rear of the building with round heads. | II |
| 36 High Street; 52.90212°N 2.14700°W | — | c. 1770 | A stuccoed shop with rusticated end pilasters, a top cornice, and a tile roof. It is in Georgian style, and has three storeys, a double depth plan, and three bays. In the ground floor is a shop front, and the upper floors contain sash windows in architraves. | II |
| 20 Stafford Street; 52.90076°N 2.14585°W | — | c. 1770 | A brick house with plaster dressings, a cornice over the ground floor, a sill band, a top cornice, and a slate roof. There are three storeys and two bays. The doorway has a plain surround and a fanlight, and to its left is a sash window with chamfered pilasters and a frieze. The other windows are casements with wedge lintels. | II |
| 22 ad 22A Stafford Street; 52.90068°N 2.14593°W | — | c. 1770 | A pair of houses, later used for other purposes, they are in brick with stucco dressings, a top cornice, and a slate roof. There are three storeys, a symmetrical front of two bays, and a single-storey rear wing. The two doorways have fluted pilaster, friezes, and pediments, and between them are two small-paned bowed shop windows under a fascia. In the middle floor are sash windows with wedge lintels, and the top floor contains two long small-paned workshop-like windows. | II |
| The Mansion House and wall, Lichfield Street; 52.90071°N 2.14270°W | — | c. 1770 | The house, which is at right angles to the street, is in brick, painted on the front, with the ground floor at the front in stone. It is in Georgian style, and has a top cornice and a tile roof with coped gables and kneelers. There are three storeys, a symmetrical front of three bays, and a lower three-storey rear wing with a porch in the angle. In the ground floor is a frieze and a cornice, and a central Doric porch with an open pediment and a doorway with a fanlight. Flanking this are French windows with fluted pilasters, and the upper floors contain sash windows with rusticated wedge lintels. In front of the middle floor windows is a full-length decorative wrought iron balcony. There are also separate balconies in front of the windows facing the street. Attached to the house and running along the street is a brick wall with stone coping. | II |
| Lock No. 30 (Limekiln Lock); 52.90648°N 2.15606°W | | c. 1771 | The lock on the Trent and Mersey Canal was designed by James Brindley. It is in brick with stone dressings, and has double lower gates and a single upper gate, all in timber. At the lower end are steps and a footbridge, and there is an overflow channel to the side. | II |
| Bridge No. 94 (Workhouse Bridge); 52.90139°N 2.14877°W | | 1771–72 | The bridge, designed by James Brindley, carries a road over the Trent and Mersey Canal. It is in brick with some plaster, and consists of a single elliptical arch. The bridge has a brick band and a brick-coped parapet. | II |
| Bridge No. 95 (Newcastle Road Bridge) and Lock No. 29; 52.90441°N 2.15271°W | | 1771–72 | The bridge carries Newcastle Road over the Trent and Mersey Canal and the lock is to the north; both were designed by James Brindley. The bridge is in brick with stone dressings and stone-coped parapets, and consists of an elliptical arch, with a round-headed tunnel for horses on the west. The lock has double lower gates and a single upper gate, all in timber, and there is a footbridge at the lower end. | II |
| Lock No. 27 (Star Lock); 52.90048°N 2.14643°W | | 1771–72 | The lock on the Trent and Mersey Canal was designed by James Brindley. It is in brick with stone dressings, and has double lower gates and a single upper gate, all in timber. The lock has steps to a footbridge at the lower end. | II |
| Lock No. 28 (Yard Lock); 52.90148°N 2.14905°W | | 1771–72 | The lock on the Trent and Mersey Canal was designed by James Brindley. It is in brick with stone dressings, and has double lower gates and a single upper gate, all in steel. The lock has steps to a footbridge at the lower end, and there is a side pound to the northeast. | II |
| Barge Docks, Boatyard; 52.90179°N 2.14924°W | | 1772 | The boatyard was extended in the 19th century. There are two dry dock and two wet docks in stone, three of which have sheds in brick iron or timber, with roofs in tile or slate, and some with open sides. | II |
| Bridge No. 92 (Andre Mills Bridge); 52.89405°N 2.13559°W | | c. 1772 | An accommodation bridge over the Trent and Mersey Canal, it is in brick with stone dressings. The bridge consists of a single elliptical arch with stone jambs, a parapet with stone coping, and end piers. | II |
| 52 and 54 Newcastle Road; 52.90462°N 2.15308°W | — | c. 1775 | A pair of brick houses with a modillioned cornice and a tile roof. There are three storeys, a symmetrical front of two bays, and a gabled rear wing. In the centre are two segmental-headed doorways, and the windows are casements. | II |
| The Swan Public House; 52.90082°N 2.14583°W | | 1770s | A warehouse, later a public house, it is in brick with a top cornice, and a tile roof. It has three storeys and three bays, and a four-storey one-bay wing to the right. The doorway has a frieze, a cornice, and a lantern. The windows are casements, and most have cambered heads. | II |
| 10 High Street; 52.90164°N 2.14596°W | — | Late 18th century | The house was altered in the 1860s, and later used for other purposes. It is in brick with stone dressings, on a stone plinth, with a band, a top cornice, and a coped parapet. The ground floor is in High Victorian Gothic style, and the upper floors are in Georgian style. There are three storeys, four bays, and a gabled rear wing with a lantern. The central doorway has a banded surround, shafts, a pointed arched head and a hood, and is flanked by triple sash windows with similar surrounds and heads. The upper floors also contain sash windows. | II |
| Former malthouse behind 28 High Street; 52.90167°N 2.14699°W | — | Late 18th century | The former malthouse is in brick with a tile roof. There are three storeys, a long rectangular plan, four bays, and a gable facing the street. The building contains loading doors, mullioned windows, some with segmental heads, and a segmental-headed doorway. | II |
| Crown Hotel, 38 High Street; 52.90221°N 2.14712°W | | 1778 | The hotel, at one time a staging post for coaches, was designed by Henry Holland in Georgian style. It is built in brick with stone dressings, a band, and a top cornice. There are three storeys, a double depth plan, a symmetrical front of three bays, the outer bays bowed, and a later two-storey rear wing on the right. In the centre is an Ionic porch, above which is a wrought iron bracket holding a flagpole. The windows on the front are sashes, those in the bowed bays in the lower two floors being tripartite. The rear wing contains a shop front, and the windows are mostly casements. | II* |
| 50 High Street; 52.90200°N 2.14676°W | — | c. 1780 | A shop and offices in brick with stone dressings, on a stone plinth, with sill bands, a top modillioned cornice, and a hipped slate roof. There are three storeys, a symmetrical three bay range on the left, and a slightly projecting two-bay range to the right. The building is in Georgian style, with a double depth plan, a rear gabled wing and later additions. The left range has a plastered ground floor, a central Tuscan porch and a round-headed doorway with a fanlight, flanked by bow windows containing tripartite sashes, and above these is a modillioned cornice. The right range has a blocked round-headed doorway to the left, and to the right is a doorway with reeded pilasters, a fanlight, and an open pediment. In the top floor are casement windows, and elsewhere the windows are sashes. | II |
| 21–27 Lichfield Street; 52.90075°N 2.14357°W | — | c. 1780 | A row of four brick houses with stucco dressings, a top cornice, and a tile roof. They are in Georgian style, with a double depth plan, three storeys, five bays, and various rear extensions. The round-headed doorways have pilasters, fanlights, and open pediments. The windows are sashes with wedge lintels that have ogival shaping and keystones, and there are two segmental-headed blind windows to the left. | II |
| Stonefield House; 52.90536°N 2.15400°W | — | c. 1780 | The house, which was altered in the 19th century, is in stuccoed brick, with a top cornice and blocking course, and a hipped slate roof. It is in Georgian style with two storeys, a double depth plan, and three bays, the outer bays canted. The central round-headed entrance has a Tuscan porch, pilasters with fluted panels, an archivolt, and a fanlight. The windows are sashes, and at the rear are three gables and a gabled wing. | II |
| Trent Hospital (Main block); 52.90171°N 2.15017°W | | 1792–93 | Built as a workhouse, and later used as a hospital, the building was expanded in the 19th century. It is in Georgian style, and built in brick with dressings in stone and plaster, bands, modillion friezes and cornices, and a slate M-shaped roof, hipped to the wings. There is an H-shaped plan, with a central block of two storeys and five bays and three-storey cross-wings. In the centre of the main block is a flat-headed doorway, and there are segmental-headed doorways in the middle of the cross wings. The windows are sashes, some of which are tripartite, and some with round-headed lights. In the right return is a tower with angle pilasters and a top frieze. | II |
| Brassworks Farmhouse; 52.89086°N 2.13172°W | — | 1794 | The farmhouse is in brick with stone dressings, a top cornice, and a tile roof. It is in Georgian style, and has three storeys, a symmetrical front of three bays, and two gabled wings and an outshut at the rear. The central doorway has an architrave, a frieze, and a pediment on consoles. The windows are sashes, those in the lower two floors with wedge lintels. | II |
| The Mill Restaurant and aqueduct 52.90348°N 2.14244°W | | 1795 | A former corn watermill, later used as a restaurant, it is in brick with a tile roof. There is a rectangular plan, four storeys, and a front of six bays. In the left bay is a segmental-headed opening, the windows are casements with segmental heads, and there is a first-floor loading door with a gabled canopy and a datestone. On the left side at first floor level is an aqueduct leading to the mill leat. | II |
| 1A Church Street; 52.90150°N 2.14490°W | — | c. 1800 | A house, later a shop, in brick, mainly painted, with a top cornice and a tile roof. It is in Georgian style with three storeys, an L-shaped plan, and two bays. The doorway has fluted pilasters, an entablature, and a pediment, to the left is a small-paned bow window with a frieze and a cornice, and to the right is a round-headed entry. The upper floors contain sash windows. | II |
| 17 and 19 Lichfield Street; 52.90081°N 2.14381°W | — | c. 1800 | A pair of brick houses with stucco dressings, a modillioned cornice, and a tile roof. They are in Georgian style, with two storeys, each house has two bays, and there is a gabled rear wing. The doorways have architraves. The windows, which are casements, and the doorway to an entry, have rusticated wedge lintels. | II |
| Walton Terrace, 59, 61 and 63 Stafford Road; 52.89586°N 2.14729°W | — | c. 1800 | A terrace of three brick houses, partly painted and partly stuccoed, with stone dressings, and a slate M-shaped roof. They have three storeys, double depth plans, each house has three bays, and there are two gabled rear wings. No. 59 has an enclosed porch with fluted pilasters, and a frieze with rosettes, and to the right is a bay window. No. 61 has a porch with Doric half-columns, a frieze and a modillion cornice carried over the doorway and flanking bow windows, and No. 63 has an enclosed porch with a top cornice and flanking bow windows. Most of the other windows are sashes. | II |
| Flint Mill; 52.90337°N 2.14282°W | — | 18th or early 19th century | The Flint Mill is in brick with a tile roof. There are two gabled storeys, and a square plan with an outshut under a catslide roof to the right. On the front is an entrance with a timber lintel, and in the upper floor are two circular windows on the north and south walls. | II |
| Cartwright tomb 52.90155°N 2.14397°W | — | c. 1805 | The tomb is in the churchyard of St Michael's Church, and is to the memory of members of the Cartwright family. It is a rectangular chest tomb in stone on a brick base, and has chamfered balusters with hollow mouldings, octagonal panels, a reeded frieze with paterae, and a catafalque with a fluted frieze with paterae. There are inscriptions on panels and on slate plaques. | II |
| 62 Newcastle Road; 52.90532°N 2.15487°W | — | c. 1810 | A brick house with a moulded cornice and a slate roof. It is in Georgian style, and has two storeys, a double depth plan, a symmetrical front of three bays, and a lean-to at the rear. The round-headed doorway has fluted pilasters, a fanlight, and an open pediment, and the windows are sashes with wedge lintels. | II |
| Stone Town Council Offices; 52.90362°N 2.14909°W | | c. 1810 | The building, later used as a police station, is in brick with stone dressings on a plastered plinth, with a sill band, modillioned eaves, and a hipped tile roof. It is in Georgian style, and has two storeys, a double depth plan, five bays, the right bay larger and projecting, and an extension to the right with a single storey and an attic, and two bays. The round-headed doorway has fluted pilasters, blocks with paterae, a fanlight, and an open pediment. The windows are sashes, and in the extension are two flat-roofed dormers. At the rear are caned bay windows. | II |
| Stowe House, 2 Uttoxeter Road; 52.89155°N 2.12635°W | — | c. 1810 | The house is in stuccoed brick with a tile roof. It is in Georgian style, and has two storeys, a symmetrical front of three bays, and two rear gabled wings. In the centre is a round-headed doorway with a Tuscan porch and a fanlight with radial glazing bars, and the windows are sashes. The longer rear wing has a modillioned cornice, and contains windows of various types, including a canted bay window. | II |
| Milepost south of Stafford Road Bridge; 52.90019°N 2.14589°W | | 1814 | The milepost is on the towpath of the Trent and Mersey Canal. It is in cast iron and has a round post, a bowed panel indicating the distances to Preston Brook and Shardlow, and a small lower plate with the date and initials. | II |
| 75 and 77 Newcastle Road; 52.90454°N 2.15346°W | — | c. 1820 | A pair of brick houses with stone dressings and a tile roof. They are in Georgian style, with two storeys, three bays, and a rear gabled wing. The doorways have reeded pilasters, entablatures, and pediments, and there is a segmental-headed entry. The windows are sashes with wedge lintels. | II |
| 79 and 81 Newcastle Road; 52.90457°N 2.15356°W | — | c. 1820 | A pair of brick houses with stone dressings and a slate roof. They are in Georgian style, with two storeys, a symmetrical front of two bays, and a rear gabled wing. The two doorways in the centre have segmental heads, and the windows are sashes with wedge lintels. | II |
| Park Lodge, 3 Beech Court; 52.90064°N 2.14050°W | — | c. 1820 | A house in stone, later plastered, with end pilasters, a top cornice, and a hipped tile roof. There are two storeys, a double depth plan, and four bays. In the centre is a tetrastyle Tuscan porch, and to the left is a canted bay window with a cornice and a parapet. On the right return is a two-storey bow window containing four-light windows with reeded pilasters, and the windows elsewhere are sashes. At the rear are three hipped gables, and a later single-storey extension. | II |
| 16 and 16A High Street; 52.90176°N 2.14628°W | — | Early 19th century | Two brick shops with stone dressings, a sill band, a top cornice and a blocking course, and a parapeted roof. It is in Georgian style, and has three storeys, three bays, and a rear gabled wing. In the ground floor are two 20th-century shop fronts, and to the left is a round-headed entry with stucco moulding, and rusticated stucco above. The windows are sashes with wedge lintels. | II |
| 28, 28A, 28D and 30 High Street; 52.90198°N 2.14673°W | — | Early 19th century | Four shops and offices in brick with stone dressings, a top dentilled cornice, and a tile roof. They are in Georgian style, with three storeys and a front on High Street with four bays. In the centre is the round-headed entry to Adies Alley which is flanked by two gabled wings. Two of the shops face High Street and the others are in the alley. On High Street are two 20th-century shop fronts and sash windows in the upper floor. In the alley are more shop fronts and varied windows. | II |
| Milestone outside 64 High Street; 52.90305°N 2.14826°W | — | Early 19th century (probable) | The milestone is in ashlar stone, and consists of a round-headed flat slab with a metal plate indicating the distances in miles to Lichfield and to London. | II |
| 7 and 9 Station Road; 52.90339°N 2.14885°W | — | c. 1830 | A pair of houses. later used for other purposes, in brick with a tile roof. There are three storeys, and each house has one bay. The round-headed doorways have fanlights and keystones. The window in the ground floor of the left house is in plate glass with a segmental head, the windows in the top floor are casements, and the other windows are sashes with wedge lintels. | II |
| Former St Mary's Home and wall 52.90412°N 2.15017°W | — | c. 1830 | A house, later used for other purposes, it is stuccoed, and has wide modillioned eaves, and a hipped slate roof. There are two storeys, a double depth plan, and four bays. The elliptical-headed doorway has a porch with Doric columns, an Ionic entablature, and a fanlight. On the right return, facing the garden, is a porch with elliptical arches, Doric columns a cornice, and an elliptical shell fanlight. Most of the windows are sashes, and the wall, which is in brick on a stone plinth with chamfered coping, extends to the right for about 33.5 metres (110 ft). | II |
| Field House, Mount Road; 52.90873°N 2.15403°W | — | c. 1835 | A brick house with stone dressings, a sill band, a top cornice and blocking course, and a hipped slate roof. It is in Georgian style, and has three storeys, and three bays. The round-headed doorway has a Tuscan surround, and the windows are sashes. At the left end is a lantern, and the right return has a ground floor projection, projected further at the far end. | II |
| Trent Hospital (South Block); 52.90152°N 2.14996°W | — | 1838–39 | An addition to a workhouse, it was later used as a hospital. It is in Georgian style, and built in brick with plaster dressings, on a plinth, with a lintel band, modillioned eaves, and a hipped slate roof. There is one storey and seven bays, the end bays projecting slightly. The windows have round heads and voussoirs, and those in the end bays are tripartite. | II |
| Flint kiln, Coppice Mill; 52.90957°N 2.13816°W | — | c. 1840 | The flint calcining kiln is in brick and has a corrugated iron roof. It is a square structure built into a slope, and there are two round niches in the rear wall. | II |
| Railway Underbridge No. 113; 52.90322°N 2.14323°W | — | 1848 | The bridge was built by the North Staffordshire Railway, and carries the railway over Mill Street. It is in brick with stone dressings, and consists of two segmental arches, the arch over the road skewed, with rusticated piers and arches. The flanking piers and abutments sweep forward and down and have end piers. At the top is a brick frieze and a stone cornice and blocking course. On the south side is a modillioned frieze and date panels. | II |
| Stone railway station 52.90831°N 2.15495°W | | 1848 | The railway station is in red brick with blue brick diapering and stone dressings, with quoins, an entablature above the ground floor, and a tile roof with three shaped gables and finials. It is in Jacobean style, and has two storeys and three bays. In the ground floor is a central loggia with three round arches. The outer bays contain entrances flanked by chamfered mullioned and transomed windows. In the upper floor are windows with five lights in the middle bay and three lights in the outer bays. The outer gables contain cartouches. | II |
| Railway Crossing Gate Keeper's Cottage; 52.91074°N 2.15833°W | — | 1848–50 | The cottage was built for the North Staffordshire Railway. It is in brick with stone dressings, and has a tile roof with coped gables. The cottage is in Tudor style, and has one storey, an L-shaped plan, and two bays. There is a gabled porch and an inner doorway, both with Tudor arched heads. The windows have ogee-moulded heads with casements. On the front facing the railway is a canted bay window with a hipped roof. | II |
| Crossing House, Uttoxeter Road; 52.89188°N 2.12536°W | | c. 1849 | The railway crossing keeper's cottage is in red brick with blue brick diapering, stone dressings, and a tile roof. There is a single storey and three bays, the middle bay projecting slightly and gabled. The central doorway has a four-centred arched head and flanking casement windows within its surround. Above is a panel of diapering, and the gable has decorative bargeboards, as has the gable on the left return. In the left bay is a two-light casement window with a stone surround. | II |
| Fourdrinier Monument; 52.90127°N 2.14299°W | — | c. 1850 | The monument is in the churchyard of St Michael's Church and is to the memory of members of the Fourdrinier family. It is in stone, and has a square base, and consists of a square monument on a plinth, with a cornice and an urn. There are inscriptions on three sides. | II |
| Blacksmith's shop, Boatyard; 52.90180°N 2.14898°W | — | Mid 19th century | The blacksmith's shop is in brick with a modillioned cornice and a slate roof. There is a single storey and a rectangular plan, and it contains a doorway and two two-paned casement windows. | II |
| Workshop and office, Boatyard; 52.90178°N 2.14867°W | — | Mid 19th century | The workshop and office are in brick with slate roofs. The workshop has a single storey and a loft, and contains a doorway and a window, both with segmental heads, and a loading door. The office to the north has a single storey, it is gabled, and contains casement windows. | II |
| Gate pier west of St Michael's Church; 52.90150°N 2.14488°W | — | Mid 19th century | The gate pier to the right of the west entrance to the churchyard is in stone. It has chamfered angles, a cornice with acanthus moulding, and a cap with a pine finial. | II |
| Church of the Immaculate Conception and St Dominic; 52.90427°N 2.15038°W | | 1852–53 | The church was designed by Charles Hansom, and was completed by Gilbert Blount in 1861–63. It is built in stone with a slate roof, and consists of a nave with a clerestory, north and south aisles, north and south transepts, a sanctuary with an apse and an ambulatory, and a small west tower. The window at the west end is in the form of a spherical triangle, and the clerestory contains similar but smaller windows. The apse has an embattled parapet and a conical roof. | II |
| St Anne's Chapel; 52.90406°N 2.15139°W | — | 1852–53 | A Roman Catholic chapel designed by A. W. N. Pugin in Early English style. It is in brick with stone dressings and has a tile roof with coped gables and apex crosses. The chapel consists of a nave and a short chancel. The west doorway has a pointed head, and above it is a niche containing a statue. | II |
| St Dominic's Convent, Priory School and walls 52.90456°N 2.15043°W | — | 1852–58 | The convent and school were designed by Joseph and Charles Hansom, they were later extended by Charles Hanson, and further extended in 1861–63 by Gilbert Blount. The buildings are in brick with stone dressings, quoins, decoration in engineering brick, and a slate roof. They are arranged around a cloister attached to the church, and the grounds are enclosed by a high brick wall with stone copings, containing arched gateways. | II |
| St John's Church; 52.90564°N 2.14745°W | | 1870 | Originally a Congregational Church, it is in stone with some plastered brick, and has a slate roof. The church is in Decorated style, and consists of a nave, a rear vestry, and a northwest steeple. The steeple has a tower with three stages, a clock face, a top cornice, and a broach spire. Inside, there is a gallery on all four sides. | II |
| Ale stores and stables, Joule's Brewery; 52.90328°N 2.15120°W | | 1881 | A complex of brewery buildings in red brick with dressings and decoration in blue brick, and tile roofs. The complex consists of a warehouse with stables and a row of cottages. The warehouse has fronts with gables and decorative finials, and contain openings including windows and loading doors. On the roof are ventilating cupolas, and other features include inscribed lintels and a chimney. | II |
| Christ Church Schools; 52.90504°N 2.14926°W | — | 1887 | The schools are in red brick with moulded brick dressings, moulded string courses, and a tile roof. There is one storey and ten bays. The outer bays are gabled and there are two similar gables in the centre. To the right is an arched doorway with a moulded surround, above which is a moulded inscribed plaque. The windows are small-paned with decorative hood moulds. On the roof is a wood and lead lantern with an ogee roof and a spirelet. | II |
| War memorial 52.90327°N 2.14838°W | | c. 1919 | The war memorial stands near a road junction. It is by Albert Toft, and consists of a tall stepped stone plinth with bronze plaques on the sides. Standing on the plinth is a statue in bronze depicting a soldier leaning on a rifle. On the plaques are the names of those lost in the war. | II |
