= Stone Rural =

Civil parish in Staffordshire, England

- Civil parish
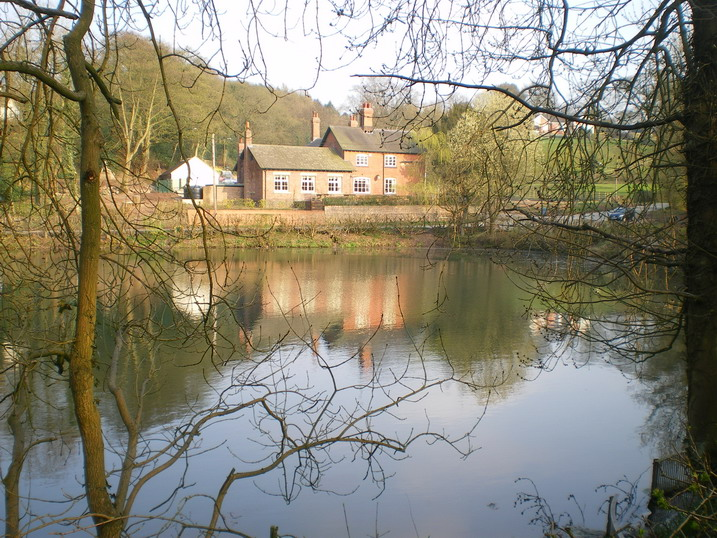
- Moddershall
- Interactive map of Stone Rural
- Coordinates: 52.928141°N 2.1111246°W
- Country: England
- Primary council: Stafford
- County: Staffordshire
- Region: West Midlands
- Stone Rural: 1894
- Status: Parish
- Main settlements: Aston-By-Stone, Burybank, Cotwalton, Knenhall, Meaford, Moddershall, Oulton, Oulton Grange and Oulton Heath

Area
  - Total: 36.96 km^{2} (14.27 sq mi)

Population (2011)
  - Total: 1,652
  - Density: 44.70/km^{2} (115.8/sq mi)
- Website: https://stoneruralparishcouncil.org.uk/

Stone Rural is a civil parish in the Stafford district, in the county of Staffordshire, England. The parish includes the settlements of Aston-By-Stone, Burybank, Cotwalton, Knenhall, Meaford, Moddershall, Oulton, Oulton Grange and Oulton Heath. In 2011 the parish had a population of 1652. The parish touches Barlaston, Chebsey, Fulford, Hilderstone, Marston, Sandon and Burston, Stone, Swynnerton, Whitgreave and Yarnfield and Cold Meece. There are 39 listed buildings in Stone Rural. The council office is in Moddershall.

== History ==
The parish was formed on 31 December 1894 when Stone parish was split into "Stone Rural" and "Stone Urban". On 31 March 1897 Hilderstone was created from part of Stone Rural, on 1 April 1897 Fulford was created from part of Stone Rural. On 1 April 1922 518 acres was transferred to Stoke on Trent. On 1 April 1932 377 acres was transferred to Fulford, 423 acres was transferred to Sandon, 572 acres was transferred to Stone and 1621 acres was transferred to Swynnerton.
