= Oulton Abbey =

Benedictine monastery in Staffordshire, England

Coordinates: 52.9174°N 2.1374°W

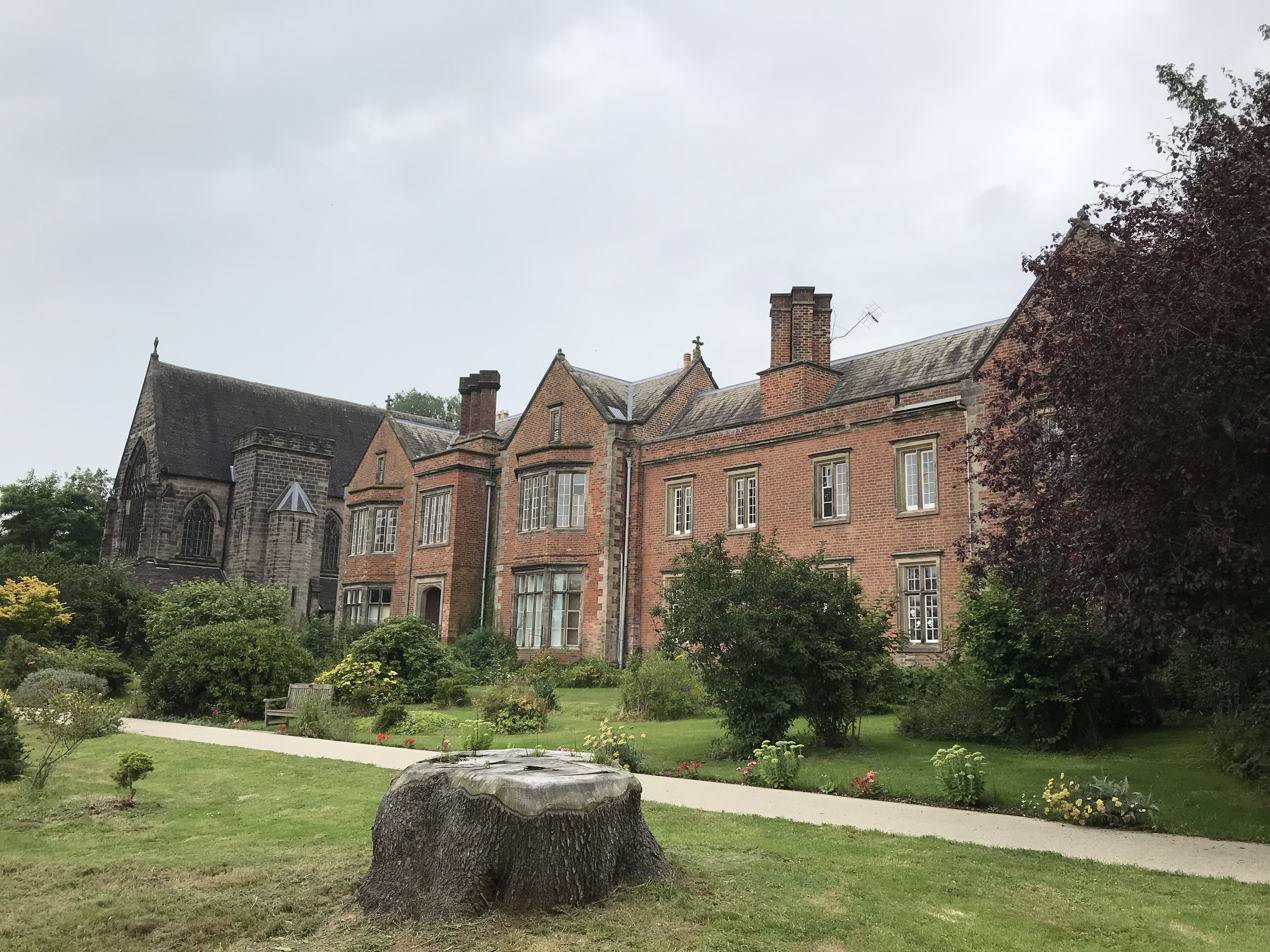
- Oulton Abbey, Staffordshire
- Formation: 1624, 1853-2019
- Founded at: Ghent Abbey
- Type: Catholic religious order
- Main organ: Communio Internationalis Benedictinarum (CIB)
- Parent organization: Catholic Church

St Mary's Abbey, Oulton is a former Benedictine convent located in the village of Oulton near Stone in Staffordshire, England. The Abbey church is Grade II* listed, and other buildings are Grade II. The Benedictine community was founded in 1624 in Ghent, from a motherhouse established in Brussels in 1598 by Lady Mary Percy. In 1794 as a result of the French Revolution the nuns were forced to flee to England, settling initially in Preston, moving in 1811 to Caverswall Castle, Stoke on Trent.

== History ==
Oulton House was built in 1720 by solicitor Thomas Dent, and gradually extended. It was purchased by brewer John Joule in 1832. By the 1850s it was in use as a private asylum.

=== Oulton community ===
In 1853 the sisters purchased Oulton House and grounds. They commissioned Edward Welby Pugin to adapt the house and build a church. A chapter house, presbytery and sacristy were added in 1892. In 1925 a chapel dedicated to St Benedict was built between the chapter house and the sanctuary, to the south.

=== 20th century ===
The sisters operated a small boarding school at the Abbey until 1969, after which the school building was converted into a retreat centre for up to twenty-four retreatants. This continued until 1989 when the main building was converted again, for adult nursing care. Three Oulton nuns transferred to Kylemore Abbey in Ireland in 1992. In 2002 the Benedictine community from Fernham Priory, Oxfordshire, closed their house and many members moved into Oulton Abbey.

=== Community governance ===
The Abbey community was under the charge of an Abbess (superior) who was elected by the community members and held the position for life. Since 1624 there have been 22 Abbesses. Recent superiors are listed below:

17. Dame Juliana Forster (1837–1869) – Brought the community to Oulton and oversaw the building of the church
18. Dame Mary Catherine Beech (1869–1899) – Oversaw the extensions and remodelling of Oulton House
19. Dame Laurentia Ward (1900–1921) – The daughter of William George Ward
20. Dame Gertrude Beech (1921–1944) – Extended the church with the new chapel
21. Dame Mary Agnes Spray (1944–1988) – Oversaw the closure of the school and the opening of the retreat house
22. Dame Mary Benedicta Scott (1988–2019) – Oversaw the opening of the nursing home and the closure of the Abbey

== The Abbey today ==
A new building was erected as a nursing home in the Abbey grounds in 2018. By 2019, with just three nuns remaining in the community, the decision was taken to close the monastic community at the Abbey, with the remaining nuns joining Stanbrook Abbey in North Yorkshire. Only the last superior, Dame Benedicta Scott, remained at Oulton as a resident of the nursing home, until her death in March 2024. A priest also remains in residence.

The property has subsequently undergone substantial refurbishment and is occupied by the Oulton Abbey Care Home.

== See also ==
- Listed buildings in Stone Rural
