= Bury Bank =

Hillfort in Staffordshire, England

- Location within Staffordshire
- 52°55′14″N 2°10′36″W
- Type: Hillfort
- Periods: Iron Age
- Location: Near Stone, Staffordshire
- OS grid reference: SJ 882 359

Site notes
- Area: 2.2 hectares (5.4 acres)

Scheduled monument
- Designated: 30 November 1925
- Reference no.: 1008548

Bury Bank is an Iron Age hillfort in Staffordshire, England, about 1.5 miles (2.4 km) north-west of Stone and near the village of Meaford. It is a scheduled monument.

It is thought that Wulfhere, King of Mercia during the 7th century, lived at this site, known as Wulfherecester.

== Description ==
The defences follow the contours of a small hill. Two ramparts, separated by a broad terrace. enclose an area of about 2.2 hectares (5.4 acres); the inner rampart is up to 0.7 metres (2.3 ft) above the interior, but is thought to have been originally higher. It was excavated in 1892, and was found to consist of earth and stones.

The outer rampart survives in places, up to height 0.5 metres (1.6 ft) internally and 3 metres (9.8 ft) externally. There is an inturned entrance at the north-west. No evidence of structures is visible in the interior, but they may exist below the surface.

No evidence has been found that the fort was re-used around the time of Wulfhere.

There are two barrows in the south of the interior: the southernmost has height 2.2 metres (7.2 ft) and diameter 25 metres (82 ft); adjacent, to the north-west, is the second barrow, height 0.5 metres (1.6 ft) and diameter 17 metres (56 ft).

== See also ==
- Hillforts in Britain
