= Aston-By-Stone =

Village in Staffordshire, England

Coordinates: 52.8796°N 2.1307°W

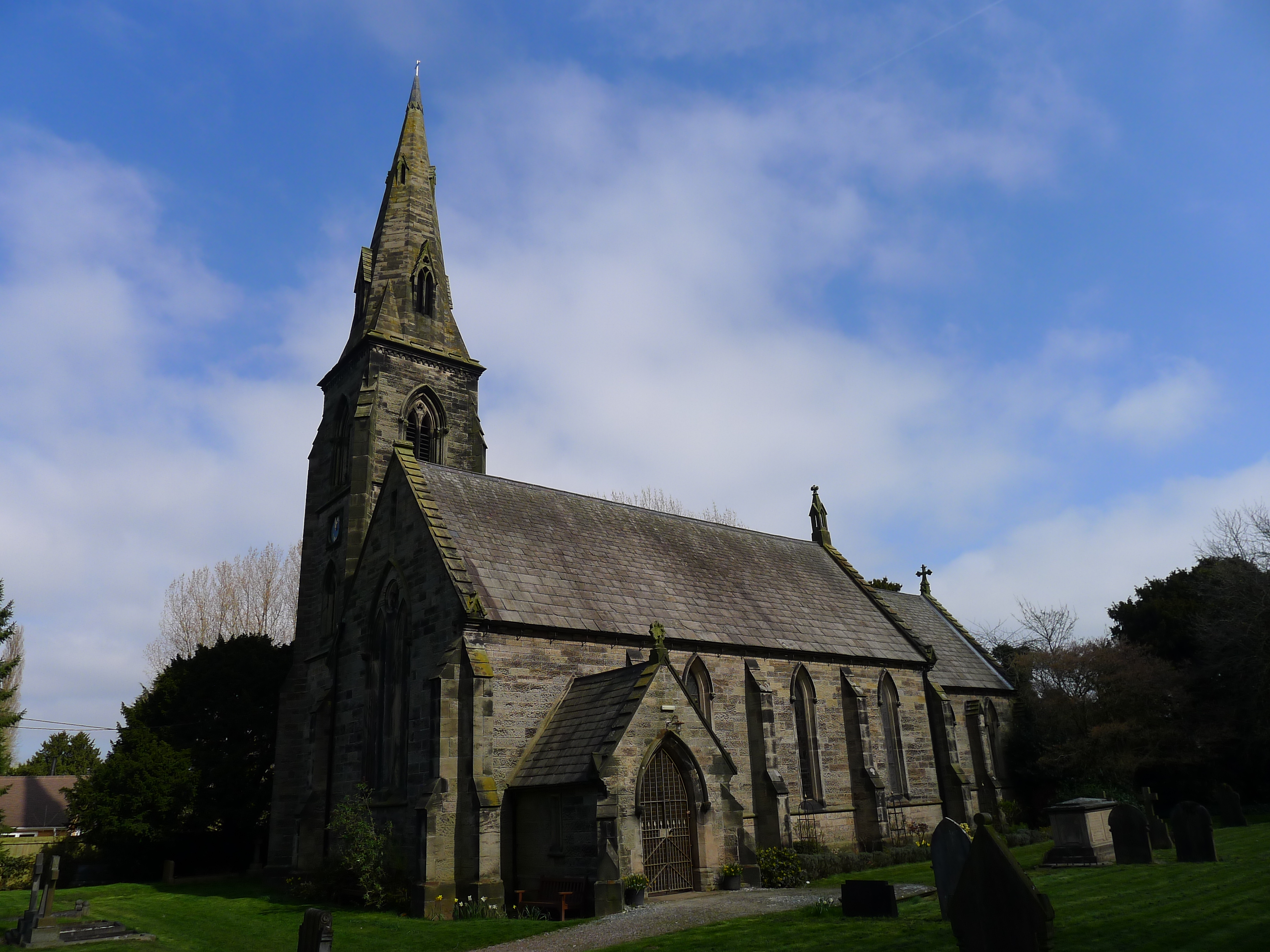

- Location within Staffordshire
- Civil parish: Stone Rural
- District: Stafford
- Shire county: Staffordshire
- Region: West Midlands
- Country: England
- Sovereign state: United Kingdom
- Post town: STONE
- Postcode district: ST15
- Dialling code: 01785
- Police: Staffordshire
- Fire: Staffordshire
- Ambulance: West Midlands

Aston-By-Stone is a village in the civil parish of Stone Rural, in the Borough of Stafford in Staffordshire, England. It is close to the town of Stone and city of Stoke-on-Trent. Circa 1870, it had a population of 625 as recorded in the Imperial Gazetteer of England and Wales. Aston was recorded in the Domesday Book as Estone. Aston-by-Stone railway station closed in 1947.
