= Oulton, Stone Rural =

Village in Staffordshire, England

Oulton
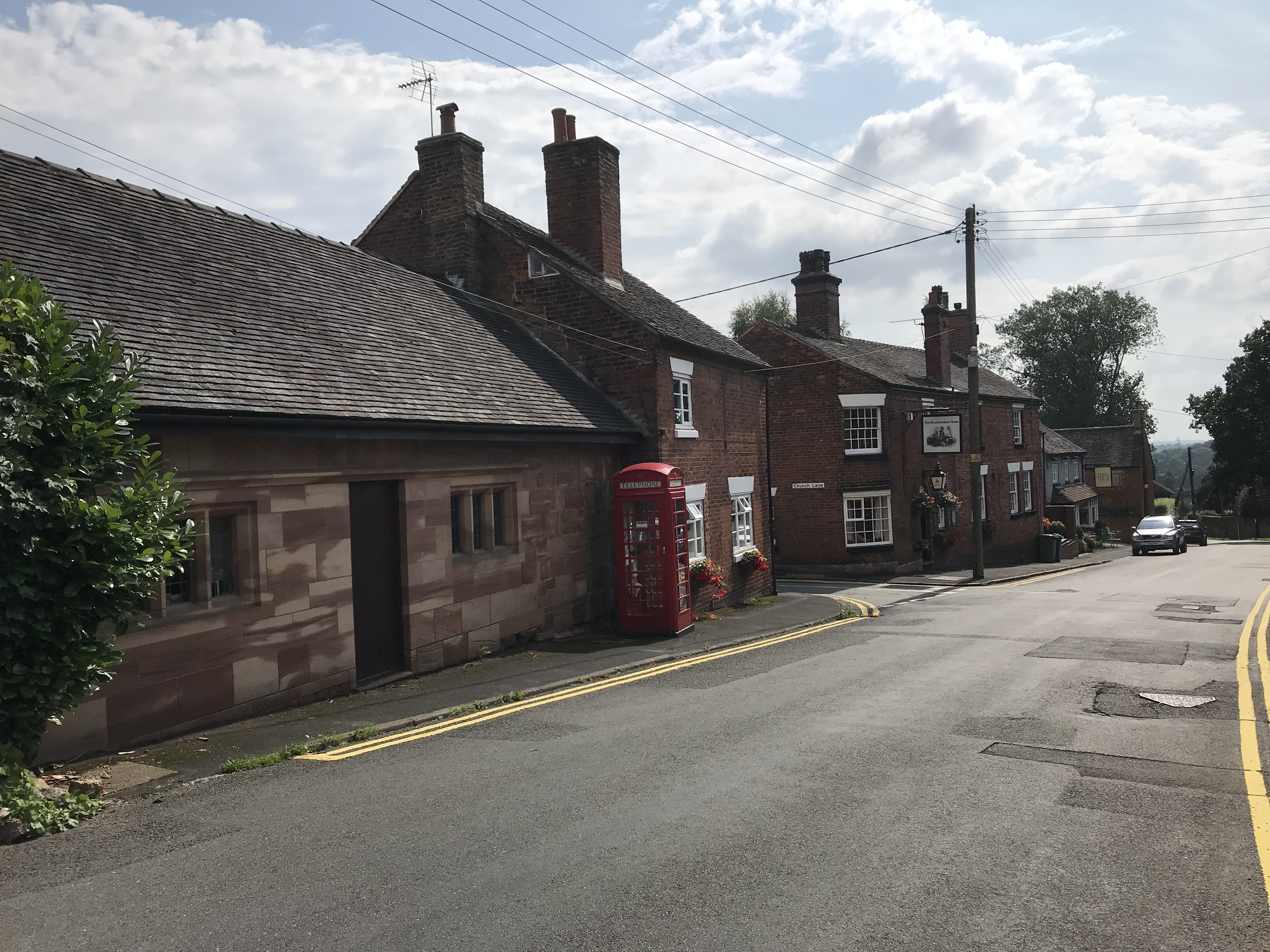

- Location within Staffordshire
- Area: 0.2200 km^{2} (0.0849 sq mi)
- Population: 597 (2020 estimate)
  - Density: 2,714/km^{2} (7,030/sq mi)
- Civil parish: Stone Rural
- District: Stafford
- Shire county: Staffordshire
- Region: West Midlands
- Country: England
- Sovereign state: United Kingdom
- Post town: Stone
- Postcode district: ST15
- Police: Staffordshire
- Fire: Staffordshire
- Ambulance: West Midlands
- UK Parliament: Stoke-on-Trent South

Oulton is a village in the civil parish of Stone Rural, in the Stafford district, in the county of Staffordshire, England. The village is located north of the market town of Stone and near to the Trent and Mersey Canal. In 2020 it had an estimated population of 597.

== History and location ==
Located in the Moddershall Valley, the geography of the area is defined by Scotch Brook which runs west from the village of Moddershall towards its confluence with the River Trent. The village is sited on a fault line of two geographical formations, Triassic sandstone to the north and east, and Keuper Marl clay to the south and south-west.

There are few references to the origins of the village of Oulton, however evidence of Anglo-Saxon settlement in the village was proven with the discovery in 1795 of ‘The Oulton Hoard’ between 1000 and 4000 coins, thought to have been buried at the time of the Norman Conquest. The village however is not mentioned in Domesday Book, but was included in the Manor of Kibblestone which was granted to William Pantulf in the 12th century. Oulton appears to have been established as a separate manor in the early 17th century with Oulton Old Hall erected as the baronial seat.

In 1589 an alehouse licence was recorded as being granted to John Morrey of Oulton. It is recorded in 1604 that the village was visited by the Plague. However the development of Oulton into an established village did not take place until the 18th century, page 35. An Enclosure Act was presented to Parliament in 1770 for the enclosure of common land at Oulton.

During the 18th century Industrial Revolution, Scotch Brook became the most intensively exploited waterway in Staffordshire, with nine Flint grinding mills located in the valley in total, and three within the confines of Oulton village. By the 1851 census Oulton was recorded as having a resident population of 376, there were three public houses and two shops, while a small shoe factory had also been established.

== Oulton today ==
The entire Moddershall Valley is now part of a designated Conservation Area. The village also sits entirely within the Stoke-on-Trent Green Belt; one of the original aims of the establishment of this greenbelt was listed as to prevent 'the coalescence of Stone with Oulton'.

The village achieved prominent positions in Staffordshire's Best Kept Village Awards in 2009 and 2010. Oulton also boasts the picturesque Downs Banks on its doorstep, and is within half an hour's drive to the Peak District National Park. Kibblestone Scout Camp is located to the north east of the village, and sits in 200 acres (81 ha) of countryside.

Oulton and Oulton Heath are populated by professional families, affluent individuals and a retiree community towards the heart of the village. The natural landscape and proximity to Stone contribute to high property prices relative to the surrounding area. The village has two public houses, The Brushmakers Arms and The Wheatsheaf.

== Religion and Education ==
An enclosed Benedictine community of nuns have lived at Oulton since 1853, residing at Oulton Abbey.

The Anglican church of St John the Evangelist was opened Whit Sunday 1875, consecrated 19 July 1878, and established as a parish 28 October 1879.

Oulton Village parish School was opened in 1863, being replaced by the present building in 1966.

== Buildings of note ==
There are fifteen Grade II listed buildings and one Grade II* listed buildings within the village environs.

=== Grade II Listed Buildings ===
- Oulton Old Hall - 17th century stone manor house with 18th century additions
- St Mary’s Abbey - 19th century Tudor style manor house, extended in 1913
- St Mary’s Abbey Presbytery - 1892 gothic style priests house
- Ivy Mill Cottage - 18th century cottages
- Mill chimney at Ivy Mill Cottage - 19th century polygonal mill chimney
- Ivy Mill Kilns - Early 19th century calcining kilns
- Hayes House - Early to mid 19th century detached house
- Hayes House, Former stables - Early to mid 19th century stable block
- Hayes House, Lodge - Mid 19th century lodge building
- Hayes Mill - Early 19th century bone grinding mill
- Grove House - Early 19th century detached mill owners house
- The Old Schoolhouse - 17th century stone building
- Abbey Lane Cottages - Early 19th century workers cottages
- Mosty Lea Mill - Early 19th century bone grinding mill

=== Grade II* Listed Building ===
- St Mary’s Abbey Chapel - 1854 chapel by Edward Welby Pugin

== Kibbleston International Scout Camp ==
Kibblestone Hall was the seat of the Copeland family of Copeland Spode. Their estate was established as a Scout Camp in the 1920s. The Hall was demolished in 1954
