= Meaford Hall, Staffordshire =

Country house in Staffordshire, UK

Coordinates: 52.9179°N 2.1668°W

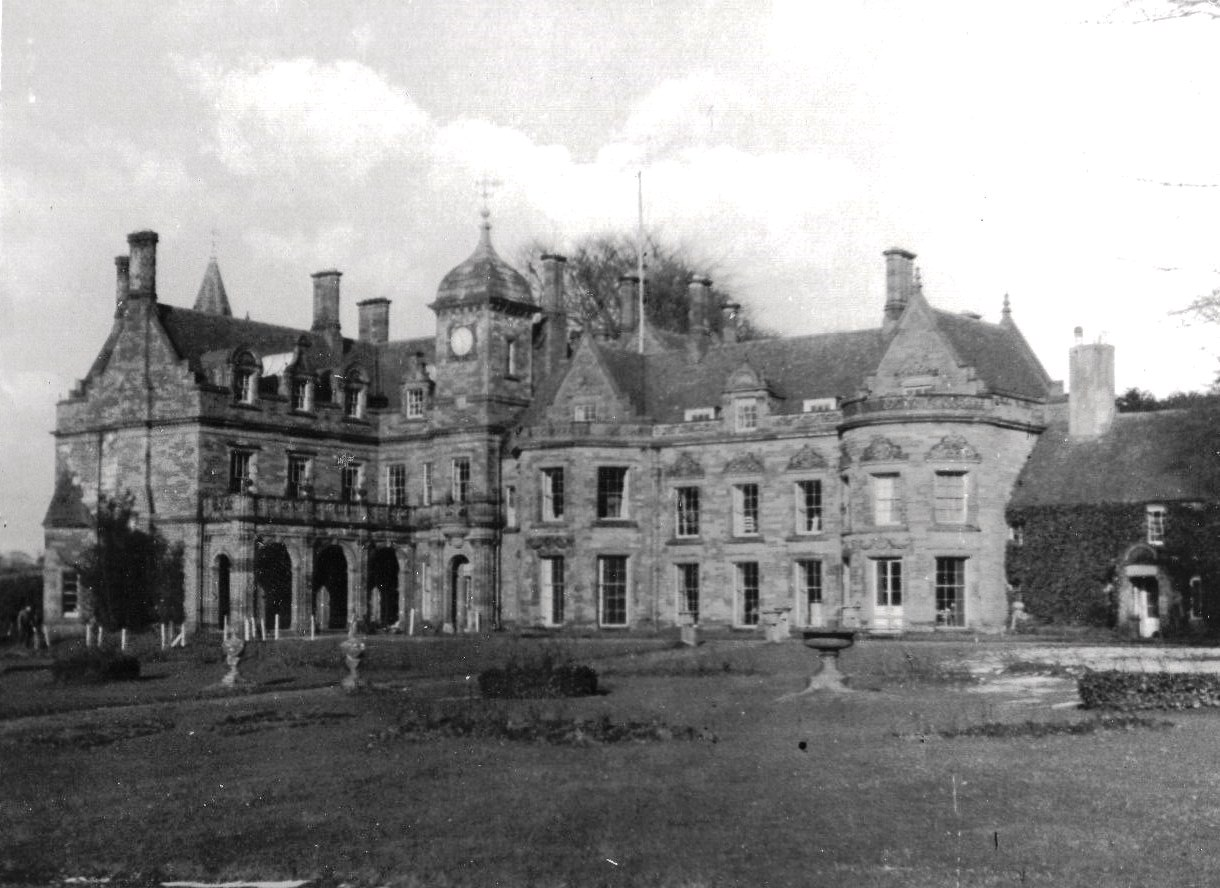
Meaford Hall photographed in 1944. The wing to the left and clock tower have since been demolished.

Meaford Hall in Staffordshire, England is a 17th-century country house at Meaford, near Stone, Staffordshire. The River Trent runs through the estate's meadow. On the river was one round and one three-sided half-turret.

It is a Grade II* listed building that reached as much as 156 feet long by 45 feet wide with a basement, ground floor and second floor. The hall consisted of two buildings with a chamber, work room and bedroom. The basement included a deeds room, wine cellar, two beer cellars and dispense cellar.

The estate was founded in the 8th century and acquired by William Jervis of Chatcull in the late 17th century and remained the seat of the Jervis family for almost 250 years.

It played a role in The 'Forty-Five' rebellion by the Young Pretender, Prince Charles Edward Stuart. Swinfen Jervis received 70 soldiers and awaited an engagement that never occurred.

It was the birthplace of Admiral John Jervis, later 1st Earl St Vincent, hero of the defeat of the Spanish at the Battle of Cape St Vincent in 1797.

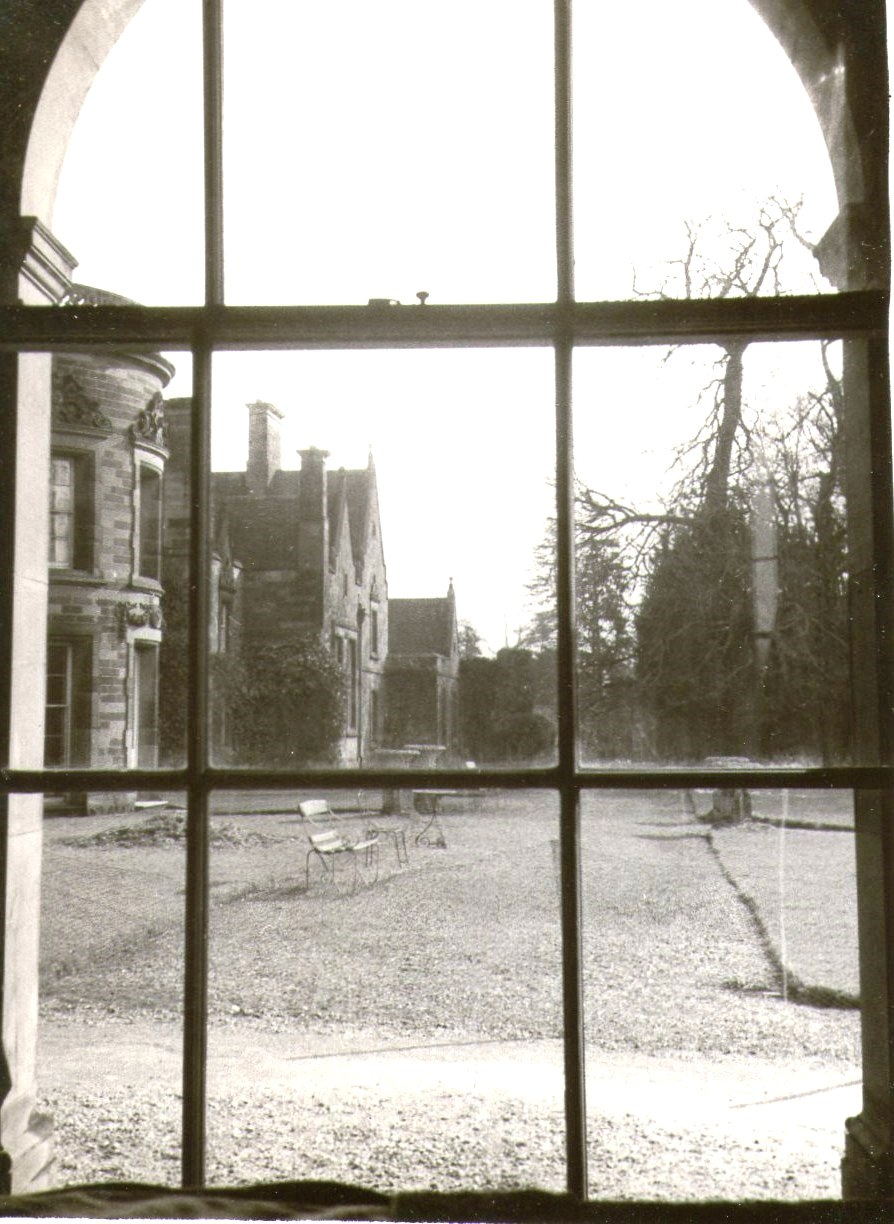
Meaford Hall from window, 1944

The hall was much extended and modernised by Lady Forester, daughter of Edward Jervis Jervis, 2nd Viscount St Vincent in the late 19th century but was sold in 1943. Thereafter it was variously occupied by the United States forces, and by a school and latterly it served as the headquarters of the building company Percy Bilton Ltd. Following a period of unoccupation and neglect the hall – much reduced in size – was restored by a new owner and was reopened on 14 February 1997, the bicentenary of the Battle of Cape St Vincent.

At some point it was acquired by Craig Johnson, who undertook a number of developments, including addition of a leisure suite.

In April 2008 Johnson was one of 21 people to be jailed in connection with a £138 million VAT carousel fraud, with the defendants sentenced to a total of 133 years – one of the largest thefts from public funds that has been brought to court after a Customs investigation. In November 2008, Johnson was ordered to repay HMRC £26 m, with £8 m due within 12 months from the sale of Meaford Hall.

== See also ==
- Listed buildings in Stone Rural
- Domesday Book
