= Moddershall =

Village in Staffordshire, England

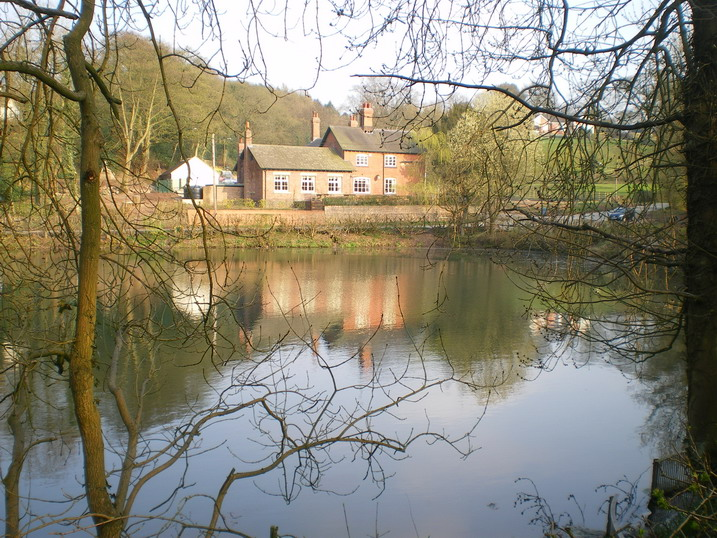
- The Boar Inn and the millpool, April 2010

- Location within Staffordshire
- Population: 947
- OS grid reference: SJ 92636 36610
- Civil parish: Stone Rural
- District: Stafford
- Shire county: Staffordshire
- Region: West Midlands
- Country: England
- Sovereign state: United Kingdom
- Post town: STONE
- Postcode district: ST15
- Dialling code: 01785; 01782
- Police: Staffordshire
- Fire: Staffordshire
- Ambulance: West Midlands
- UK Parliament: Stoke-on-Trent South

Moddershall is a small village in the borough of Stafford in the county of Staffordshire, England, part of the civil parish of Stone Rural and ecclesiastical parish of Oulton with Moddershall. Lying to the East of the River Trent, it is roughly halfway between the city of Stoke-on-Trent and the small town of Stone.

== Moddershall Valley ==
The geography of the area is defined by the Scotch Brook, which after rising close to All Saints Church to the north of the village, runs round from the east of the village, then westwards and down towards its confluence with the River Trent.

== History ==
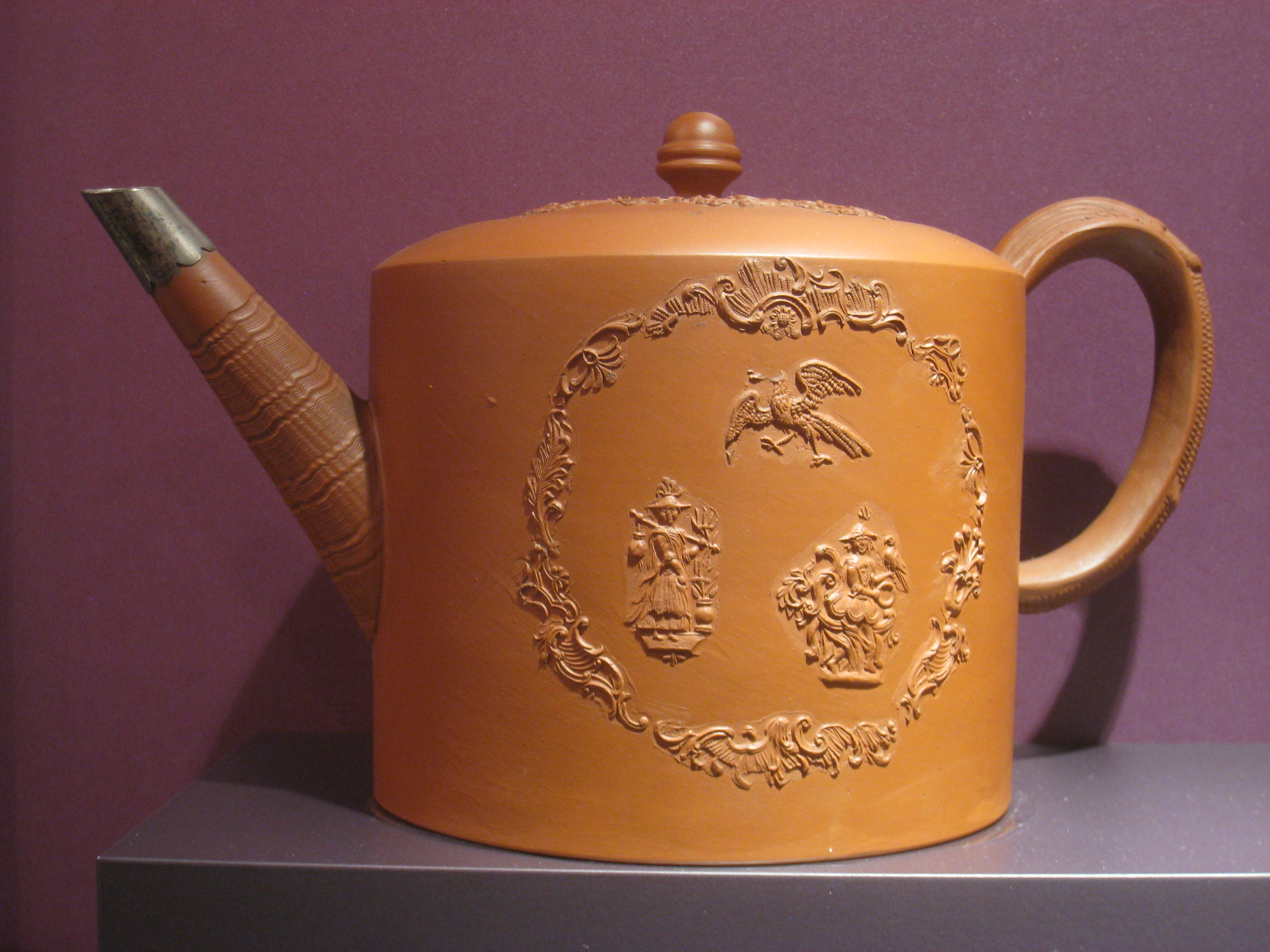
Original reddish-brown Stafford Pottery coffee pot, now on display at the DAR Museum, Washington, D.C.

Moddershall village is mentioned in Domesday Book, listed as Modders Hale. During the 10th century, farming was the main activity, with the local reddish-brown clay being used to create suitable building bricks, topped with slate roofs.

Although not as important as the forges and watermills of the Churnet Valley which had seven flint-grinding mills (two at Cheddleton, three at Consall and two at Frogall), the Moddershall Valley is best known and resultantly conserved as an early Industrial Revolution site, due to the number of watermills within the valley. To be legally allowed to extract water from the area, the miller would need to gain the permission of the Lord of the Land, which for the manor of Moddershall Valley was controlled from Butterton, by the Lords of Stafford at Swynnerton Hall.

It is likely that corn mills existed in the valley from the 12th century, and evidence exists to show numerous mills during the Middle Ages. But it was not until 1720 that local potter John Astbury of Shelton discovered that adding heated and ground flint powder to the local reddish clay could create a more palatable white or cream ware, that sold at higher volumes to the natural Staffordshire Potteries reddish colour. The flint was sourced from either the South Coast of England or France, and then shipped to the Port of Liverpool or Shardlow, near Derby on the River Trent. After shipping to the mills on pack horse, it was sorted to remove the flint with reddish-hues, and then heated to 1,200 °C (2,190 °F) to create an easily ground product.

However, the grinding process produced a fine siliceous dust, that after adhering to the workers lungs resulted in cases of silicosis, similar to the condition of pneumoconiosis suffered by coal miners. The result was that workers tried to do any work but flint grinding. Resultantly, in the early 1900s four mills in the valley converted to grinding bone, which had a similar effect.

By the late 1930s the mills were in decline, and a shortage of skilled manpower and cheap supply product, meant that after World War II the mills began to close. By the 1970s, only Hayes and Ivy mills were in operation, although their water wheels were out of operation and the grinding mechanism was powered by electricity. The closure of Hayes Mill in 1977 brought to an end 250 years of milling in the valley.

== Present ==
All Saints' Church was built from local stone in 1903/4 by three daughters of Hensleigh Wedgwood including Frances Julia Wedgwood. It was completely taken down and re-erected on new foundations in 1993/94 following subsidence damage from nearby Florence Colliery. According to the 2001 UK census, the population of the civil parish (of which Moddershall is only one ward) was 947. The entire Moddershall Valley is now part of a designated Conservation Area.

== Governance ==
For administrative purposes Moddershall forms part of Stone Rural civil parish which, in turn, forms part of the borough of Stafford.

== Watermills in the Moddershall Valley ==
Watermills in the Moddershall Valley
Name	Image	Location	Status	Co-ordinates	Notes
Boar Mill		Moddershall	Demolished; Site to the left, just off this photograph		Originally a corn mill covering a total plot of 2 acres (0.81 ha), it was converted to a flint-grinding mill in 1851. The water wheel had 18 feet (5.5 m) diameter and was 4 feet (1.2 m) wide, resulting in a driving force of 44 horsepower (33 kW). The last miller was Joseph Brooks; the mill closed in 1954 and was demolished in January 1965.
Coppice Mill		Stone	Largely Intact; Non-operational	52.909559°N 2.137946°W	Originally a paper mill, by 1853 a flint mill. The stables, calcining kilns, waterwheel, grinding machinery and settling tanks survive together with the millers cottage
Flint Mill		Stone, adjacent to Stone Mill	Restored; Private house	52.903393°N 2.142828°W	Featured on Channel 4's The Restoration Man
Hayes Mill		Oulton	Restored; Non-operational	52.912981°N 2.132603°W	Built as a flint mill, 1750. Named Lower Mill, then Brook Bank Mill and finally Hayes Mill. Originally the wheel was an overshot type of 20 feet (6.1 m) diameter and 6.5 feet (2.0 m) wide, made of wood with an iron shroud. It ceased grinding in 1966 but the arks, wash tubs and drying kilns continued to be used until 1977. Machinery survives, as does its brick chimney
Ivy Mill		Oulton	Restored; Operational	52.916584°N 2.126071°W	First flint-grinding mill in the valley, built 1726. Originally named Oil Mill (1860), Goodwin's Mill (1867), Oulton Mill (1888) and finally Ivy Mill. Original water wheel of 19 feet (5.8 m) diameter and 6 feet (1.8 m) wide, constructed of wood with iron shrouds. Best preserved of all the valley's mills, the mechanism dates to the late 18th century. Grade II listed structure
Mostylee Mill		Moddershall	Restored; Non-operational	52.923509°N 2.123414°W	First recorded as a corn mill in 1716. Abandoned 1961, but machinery survives
Ochre Mill		Lower Moddershall	Demolished		Originally a corn mill, converted to a flint-grinding mill in 1867
Top Mill		Lower Moddershall	Demolished		
Top or Splashy Mill		Lower Moddershall	Restored; Operational	52.926928°N 2.120448°W	Originally a corn mill, converted to a flint-grinding mill in 1867. Gained its name due to having two opposing water wheels, one overshot and one undershot
Weaver's Mill or Stone Mill		Stone, adjacent to Flint Mill	Converted to restaurant	52.903488°N 2.142305°W	Not the only mill in Stone, but perhaps the most substantial. The present building (1785) was built on the site of an earlier mill. It ground flour and the wheel was eventually replaced by a turbine, then electrically powered until it ceased milling, perhaps in the late 1970s.
Wetmore or Kibblestone Mill		Moddershall	Demolished	52.921348°N 2.126085°W	A millers cottage and the water wheel survives

== See also ==
- Cheddleton Flint Mill
- Meir
