= Meaford, Staffordshire =

Hamlet in Staffordshire, England

Meaford
- Location within Staffordshire
- Civil parish: Stone Rural
- District: Stafford
- Shire county: Staffordshire
- Region: West Midlands
- Country: England
- Sovereign state: United Kingdom
- Post town: Stone
- Postcode district: ST15
- Police: Staffordshire
- Fire: Staffordshire
- Ambulance: West Midlands
- UK Parliament: Stone

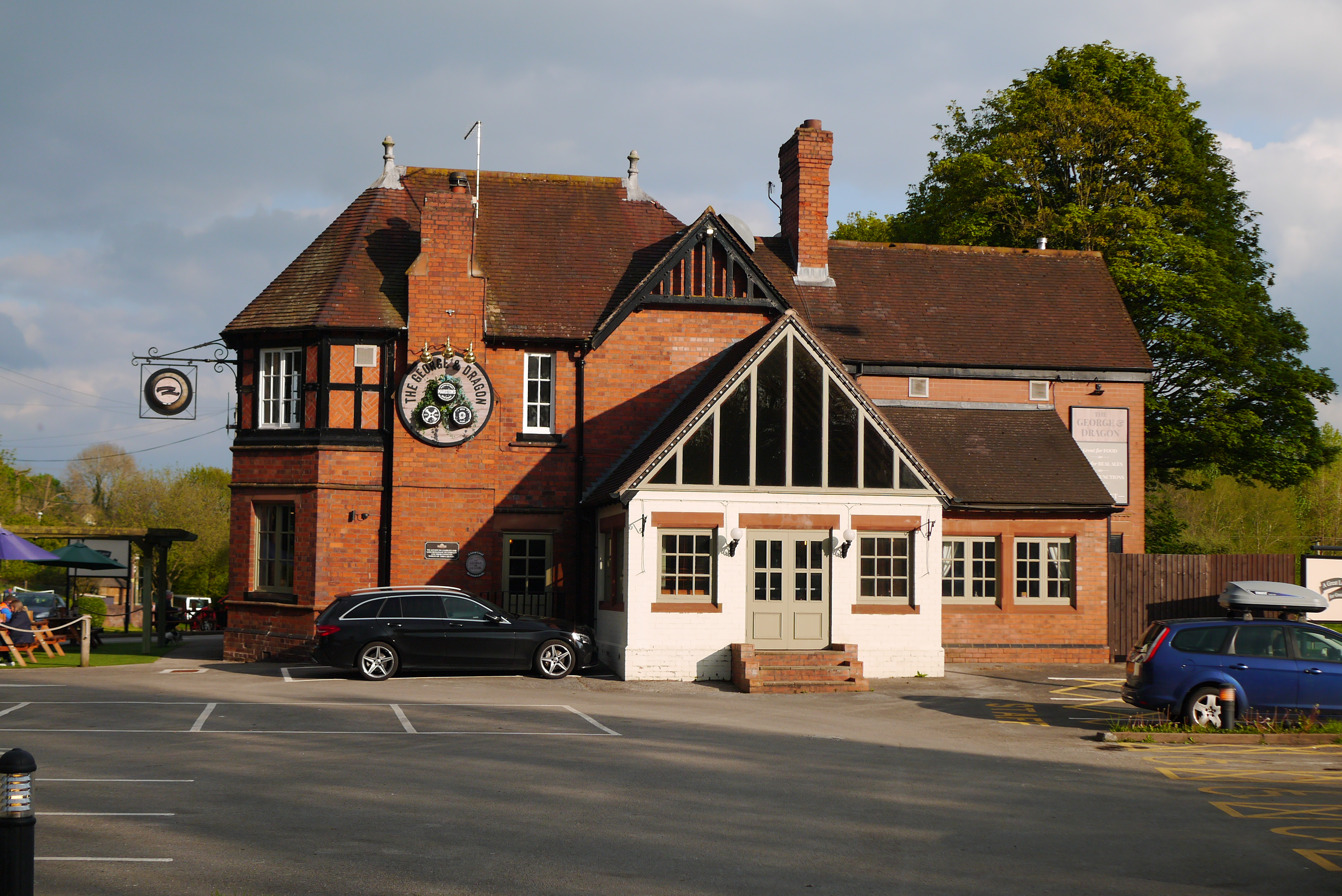
George and Dragon Public House, Meaford

Meaford is a hamlet in the civil parish of Stone Rural, in the Stafford district, in the county of Staffordshire, England. It lies at the junction of the A34 and A51 roads, north of Stone on the River Trent. Meaford Lock is on the Trent and Mersey Canal. Meaford's most famous son is John Jervis, 1st Earl of St Vincent, the naval hero.

Meaford was for the later part of the 20th century easily identifiable from the main A34 road by the coal-fired Meaford Power Stations, operated by the CEGB and later National Power. Meaford 'A' of 120 MW capacity opened in the late 1940s, ceased generation in 1974 and was demolished in 1982. Meaford 'B' of 260 MW capacity was formally opened in 1957, generated power for the last time at 13:00 on 28 September 1990, was formally closed on 1 October 1991 and demolition was nearly complete on 9 June 1996 when the 408 feet (124 m) tall brick chimney was demolished.

Bury Bank, an Iron Age hillfort, is a short distance to the north.

== See also ==
- Meaford Hall, Staffordshire
