= North Kent =

- Proposed unitary authority area
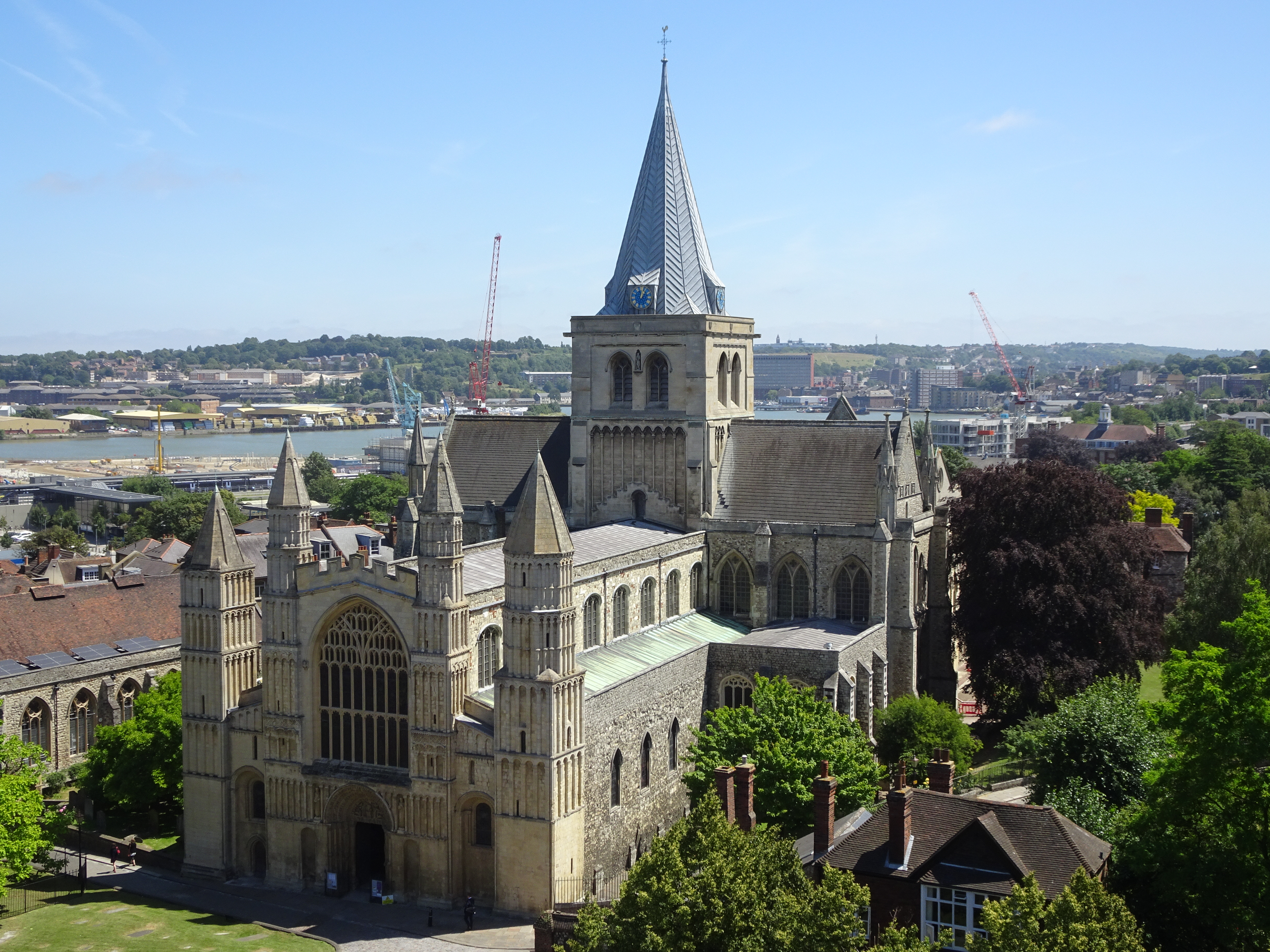
- Rochester Cathedral, in Rochester

- Interactive map
- Coordinates: 51.3819°N 0.5265°E
- Sovereign state: United Kingdom
- Country: England
- Region: South East
- Ceremonial county: Kent

Government
  - Type: Unitary authority
  - Body: North Kent Council

Area
  - Total: 141 sq mi (366 km^{2})

Population (2024 estimate)
  - Total: 528,337
- Time zone: UTC+0 (GMT)
  - Summer (DST): UTC+1 (BST)

North Kent was a proposed unitary authority area in Kent, England. It was scheduled to be created as part of upcoming local government reform. It would have been formed from the existing Medway unitary authority area, and the Dartford and Gravesham two-tier districts.

North Kent would have bordered West Kent and Mid Kent, as well as the London Borough of Bexley. The area is also connected by road to the proposed South West Essex. The largest settlement would have been Gillingham.

Chatham, Dartford, Gillingham, Gravesend, Northfleet, Rochester and the Ebbsfleet area are currently unparished, the rest of the area is parished. The area has a 2024 estimated population of 528,337.

Plans to create it were halted in September 2026 and the 2027 election was cancelled. In October 2026, the plans to create it were withdrawn.

== History ==
North Kent was first formed by proposals brought by Kent district councils as part of structural changes to local government in England which began in 2024. Prior to the local government reform, most of Kent had a two-tier system where Kent County Council and would provide local services; however, the conurbation around Gillingham was in the pre-existing Medway unitary authority. Medway had been administratively part of Kent before 1998.

Following the 2024 Devolution White Paper, the ruling Labour Party announced that the government would seek to establish unitary authorities in the remaining two-tier areas including Kent. In February 2025, the government wrote to the local authorities in Kent asking them to submit proposals for two-tier areas under the Local Government and Public Involvement in Health Act 2007. A North Kent district was included in all the proposals brought forward by district councils while a single-unitary option merging Kent and Medway was supported by the county council.

Option 4b, with the boundaries as planned, was selected by the government in July 2026. The alternative proposal for four unitaries and the proposals for a single unitary, or three or five unitaries were not accepted. Medway Council had supported a modified Option 4, named 4d, in which North Kent's boundaries would have been modified to more closely align with the built-up areas, also including most of Swale. Dartford and Gravesham borough councils had jointly proposed Option 5a, where North Kent would have excluded the parts of Medway district east of the River Medway.

In September 2026, the Kent proposals were halted by the government and placed under review. In October 2026, plans to create it were withdrawn. The decision was threatened with judicial review by Kent County Council.

== Governance ==
It would have been run by North Kent Council, which would haved comprise 81 councillors.
