= Mid Essex =

- Proposed unitary authority area
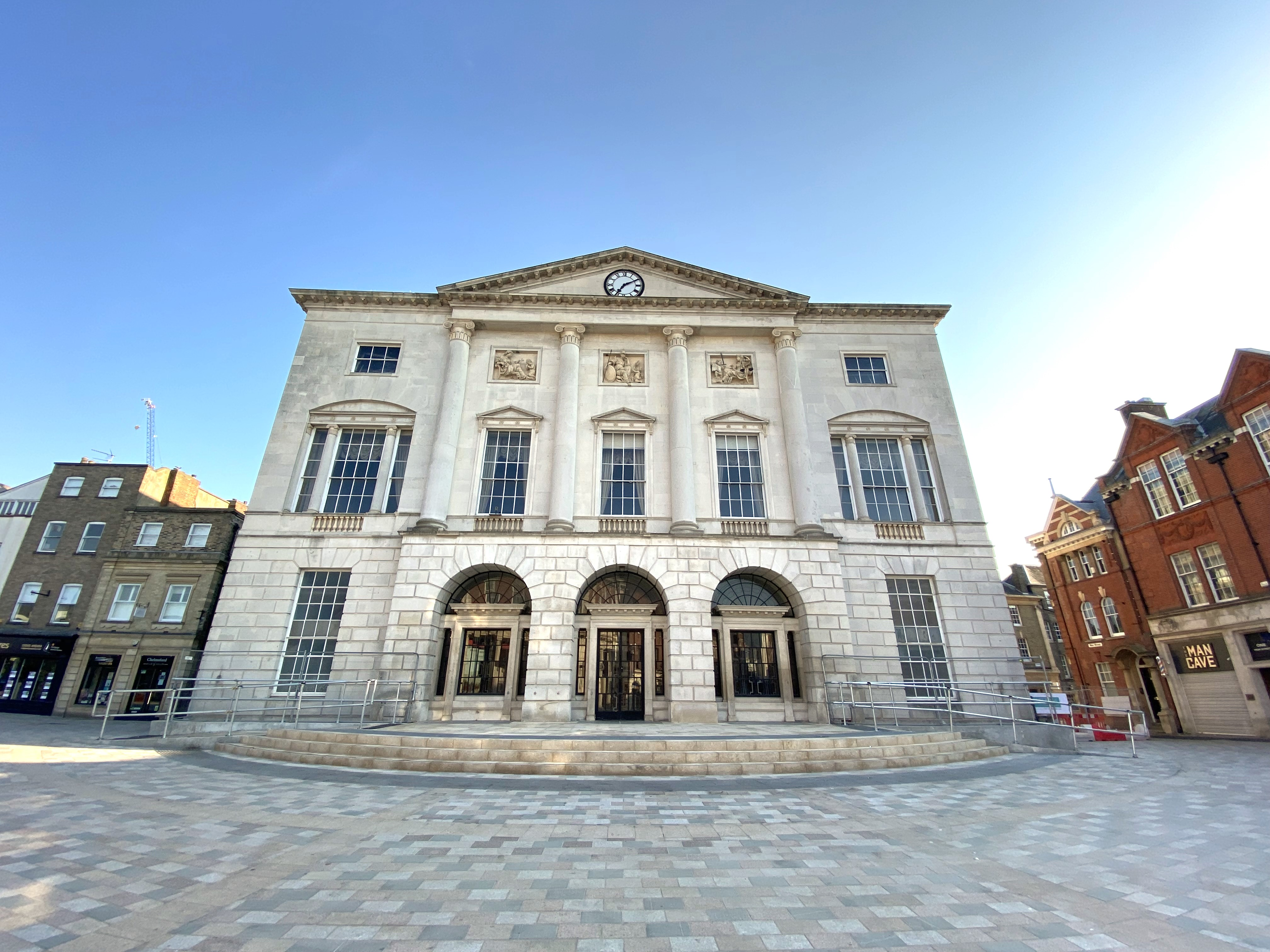
- Chelmsford

- Mid Essex shown within Essex
- Interactive map of Mid Essex
- Coordinates: 51.735°N 0.480°E
- Sovereign state: United Kingdom
- Country: England
- Region: East
- Ceremonial county: Essex

Government
  - Type: Unitary authority
  - Body: Mid Essex Council

Area
  - Total: 328.1 sq mi (849.7 km^{2})

Population (2024 estimate)
  - Total: 337,260
  - Density: 1,028/sq mi (396.9/km^{2})
- Time zone: UTC+0 (GMT)
  - Summer (DST): UTC+1 (BST)

Mid Essex was a proposed unitary authority area that was scheduled to be created in April 2028 in Essex, England. As part of an ongoing local government reorganisation, it was intended to be formed from the three existing districts of Brentwood, Chelmsford and Maldon. The first councillors to Mid Essex Council would have been elected in May 2027. The largest settlement in the district would have been Chelmsford. Plans to create it were withdrawn in September 2026.

== History ==
In February 2025, Essex was accepted into the Devolution Priority Programme. Tied to this, councils were invited to submit proposals for the reorganisation of local government districts by September 2025. The government held statutory consultations from November 2025 to January 2026 and made a decision in March 2026. In Mid Essex, it was decided to create a new unitary authority district by combining Brentwood, Chelmsford and Maldon.

In September 2026, the Essex proposals were withdrawn by the government in light of new legal advice. The decision was threatened with judicial review by Essex County Council.

== Geography ==
The largest settlement in the district would have been the city of Chelmsford. The Office for National Statistics mid-2023 population estimate of the proposed district was 331,757.

=== Parishes ===
Parts of the proposed district, including Brentwood and Chelmsford, are unparished. The Chelmsford district holds city status and its council was considering options for the preservation of this, including the use of charter trustees.

The rest of the area is made up of civil parishes:

- Althorne, Asheldham (Note: Shares grouped parish council with Dengie)
- Blackmore, Hook End and Wyatts Green, Boreham, Bradwell-on-Sea, Broomfield, Burnham-on-Crouch
- Chelmer, Chelmsford Garden, Chignall, Cold Norton
- Danbury, Dengie (Note: Shares grouped parish council with Asheldham), Doddinghurst
- East Hanningfield
- Galleywood, Goldhanger, Good Easter, Great and Little Leighs, Great Baddow, Great Braxted, Great Totham, Great Waltham
- Herongate and Ingrave, Hazeleigh (Note: Shares grouped parish council with Woodham Mortimer), Heybridge, Heybridge Basin, Highwood
- Ingatestone and Fryerning, Kelvedon Hatch
- Langford (Note: Shares grouped parish council with Ulting), Latchingdon, Little Baddow, Little Braxted, Little Totham, Little Waltham
- Maldon, Margaretting, Mashbury , Mayland, Mountnessing, Mundon
- Navestock, North Fambridge
- Pleshey, Purleigh
- Rettendon, Roxwell, Runwell
- Sandon, St Lawrence, South Hanningfield, Southminster, South Woodham Ferrers, Springfield, Steeple, Stock, Stondon Massey, Stow Maries
- Tillingham, Tollesbury, Tolleshunt D'Arcy, Tolleshunt Knights, Tolleshunt Major
- Ulting (Note: Shares grouped parish council with Langford)
- West Hanningfield, West Horndon, Wickham Bishops, Writtle, Woodham Ferrers and Bicknacre, Woodham Mortimer (Note: Shares grouped parish council with Hazeleigh), Woodham Walter

== Governance ==
The local authority would have been Mid Essex Council. The first councillors would have been elected in May 2027. This election was cancelled in September 2026.
