= South West Hampshire =

- Proposed unitary authority area
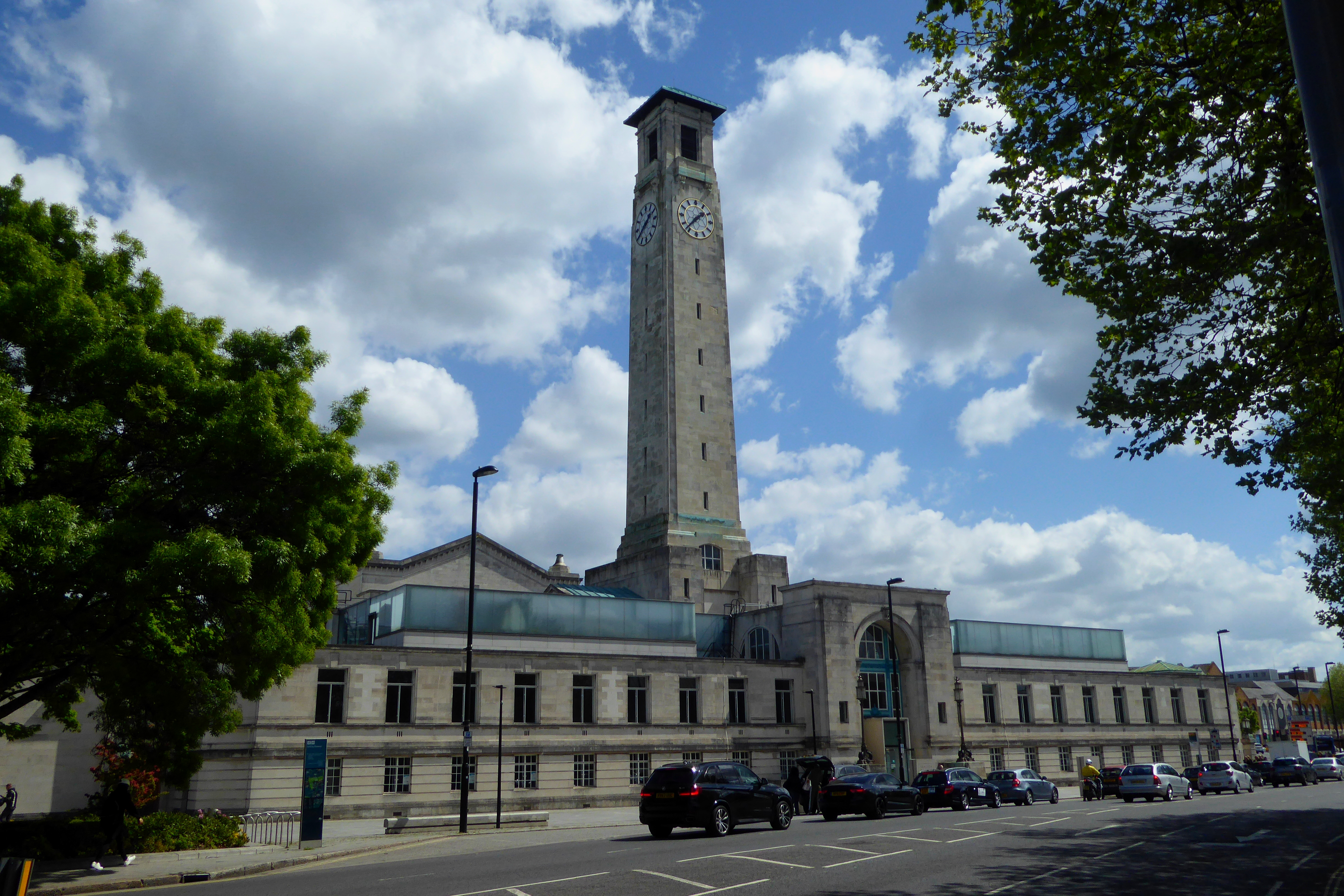
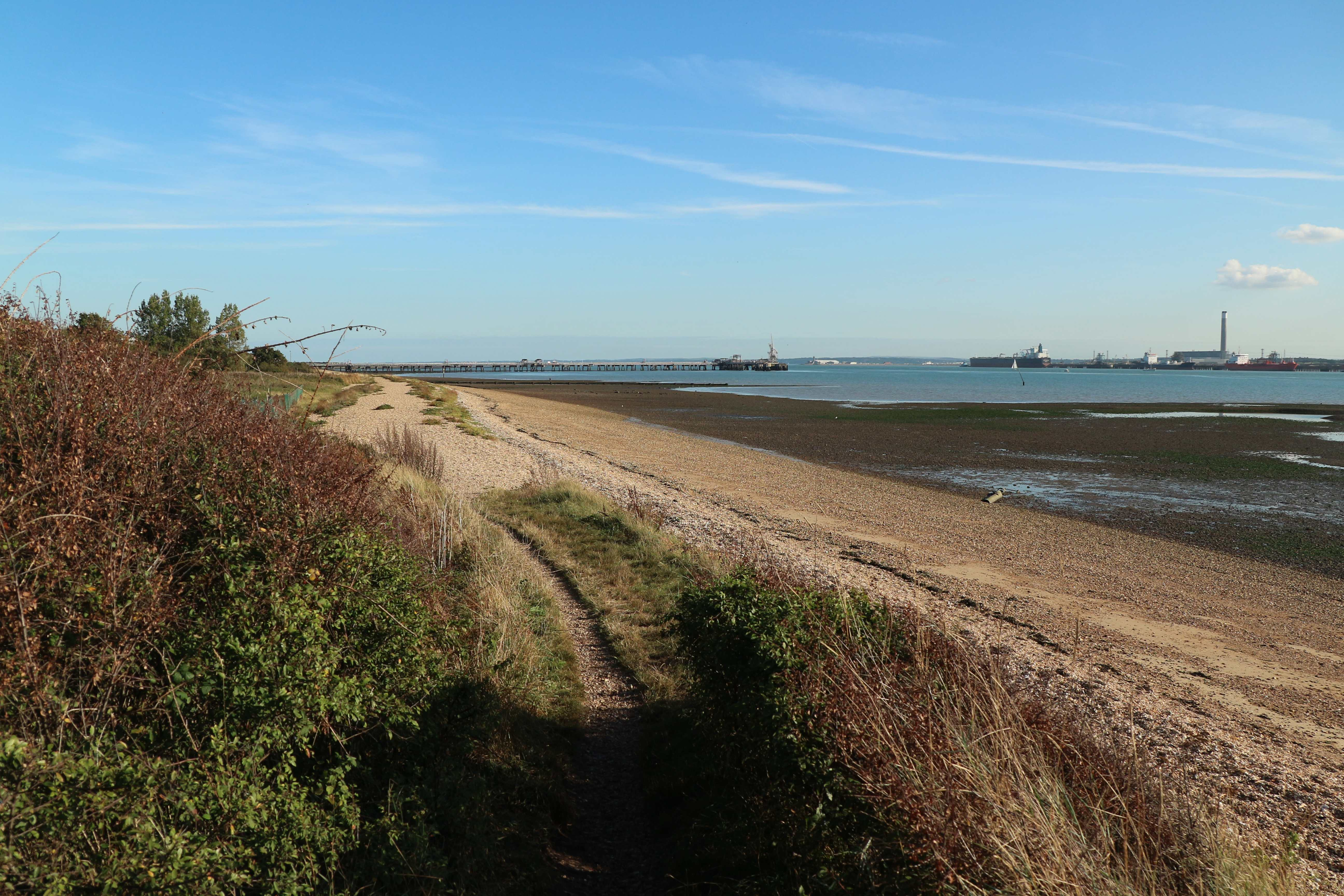
- Southampton Civic Centre and Fawley Power Station as seen from Hamble-le-Rice

- Interactive map
- Coordinates: 50.90°N 1.40°W
- Sovereign state: United Kingdom
- Country: England
- Region: South East
- Ceremonial county: Hampshire

Government
  - Type: Unitary authority
  - Body: South West Hampshire Council

Area
  - Total: 121.6 sq mi (315.0 km^{2})

Population (2024 estimate)
  - Total: 487,060
- Time zone: UTC+0 (GMT)
  - Summer (DST): UTC+1 (BST)

South West Hampshire was a proposed unitary authority area that was scheduled to be created in April 2028 in Hampshire, England, as part of ongoing local government reform. It would have been formed by a merger of the existing unitary authority of Southampton with the two-tier district of Eastleigh, as well as parts of the New Forest and Test Valley districts including Totton and Hythe. The first councillors would have been elected in May 2027, and the new authority would have assumed full powers in April 2028.

The area has a estimated population of 510,102.

Plans to create it were withdrawn in September 2026 and the 2027 election was cancelled. The decision was threatened with judicial review by Hampshire County Council.

== Parishes ==
The area would have the following parishes:

- Allbrook
- Bishopstoke
- Botley
- Bursledon
- Chandler's Ford
- Chilworth
- Eastleigh Town
- Fair Oak and Horton Heath
- Fawley
- Hamble-le-Rice
- Hedge End (town)
- Hound
- Hythe and Dibden
- Marchwood
- Nursling and Rownhams
- Totton and Eling (town)
- Valley Park
- West End
