= Upcoming structural changes to local government in England =

English local authority districts by year of restructuring: 1986; 1995–1998: 1995 1996 1997 1998; 2009; 2019–2023: 2019 2020 2021 2023; 2027+: 2027 Paused or withdrawn Not yet announced

Proposed structural changes to local government in England were set out in the English Devolution White Paper published by the UK government on 16 December 2024. The purpose of the change is to introduce unitary local government in nineteen areas where services are currently provided by both county councils and district councils. The proposed changes follow similar waves of reorganisation which took place in 1995–1998, 2009 and 2019–2023. The process runs alongside, but separate to, the establishment of strategic authorities in England as part of English devolution.

Surrey is currently undergoing a transition to unitary local government. The first elections to the new East Surrey Council and West Surrey Council took place on 7 May 2026, with the new councils operating as "shadow authorities" until they take over local government responsibilities on 1 April 2027.

The government announced how most of the remaining two-tier areas would be reorganised in March and July 2026; no decision was made for Cambridgeshire or West Sussex. The intention was that the first elections to the new councils of these areas would take place on 6 May 2027, and that they would formally take over local government responsibilities on 1 April 2028. Legal challenges were threatened in all but three review areas. In September 2026, the government paused the reorganisation in all areas except Surrey, and withdrew previously announced decisions for Essex, Hampshire, Norfolk and Suffolk. In October 2026, decisions for nine further areas were withdrawn, with five areas taken forward for consultation and elections to the new authorities expected to take place in May 2028.

== Background ==
Changes to local government structures, such as the replacement of district and county councils with unitary authorities, became possible with secondary legislation following the Local Government and Public Involvement in Health Act 2007. Prior to that there had been a Local Government Commission for England to recommend structural changes which took place between 1995 and 1998. Under the 2007 legislation, rounds of reorganisation took place in 2009 and 2019–2023. Several large unitary authorities were created in 13 ceremonial county areas, either by replacing a two-tier county council and its two-tier non-metropolitan district councils with a single unitary council (in Cornwall, County Durham, Northumberland, Shropshire, Wiltshire, Buckinghamshire, North Yorkshire, Somerset) or by dividing the county area into two or more new unitary councils (in Bedfordshire, Cheshire, Dorset, Northamptonshire, Cumbria).

== Summary ==
=== Status ===
As of October 2026, the status of local government reorganisation across the government's 19 invitation areas is as follows:

Reorganisation area	Status	Consultation dates		Statutory instrument	First election	Vesting day	Ref.
Reorganisation area	Status	Start	End	Statutory instrument	First election	Vesting day	Ref.
Surrey	Confirmed	17 June 2025	5 August 2025	2026 No. 264	7 May 2026	1 April 2027	
Essex, Southend-on-Sea, Thurrock	Initial decision withdrawn	19 November 2025	11 January 2026				
Hampshire, Isle of Wight, Portsmouth, Southampton	Initial decision withdrawn	19 November 2025	11 January 2026				
Norfolk, Suffolk	Initial decision withdrawn	19 November 2025	11 January 2026				
East Sussex, Brighton and Hove, West Sussex	Preferred option announced for East Sussex and Brighton and Hove; Awaiting decision for West Sussex	19 November 2025	11 January 2026				
East Sussex, Brighton and Hove, West Sussex	Preferred option announced for East Sussex and Brighton and Hove; Awaiting decision for West Sussex	12 May 2026	15 June 2026				
Derbyshire, Derby	Initial decision withdrawn	5 February 2026	26 March 2026				
Devon, Plymouth, Torbay	Initial decision withdrawn	5 February 2026	26 March 2026				
Gloucestershire	Preferred option announced	5 February 2026	26 March 2026				
Hertfordshire	Initial decision withdrawn	5 February 2026	26 March 2026				
Kent, Medway	Initial decision withdrawn	5 February 2026	26 March 2026				
Lancashire, Blackburn with Darwen, Blackpool	Initial decision withdrawn	5 February 2026	26 March 2026				
Leicestershire, Leicester, Rutland	Initial decision withdrawn	5 February 2026	26 March 2026				
Lincolnshire, North East Lincolnshire, North Lincolnshire	Initial decision withdrawn	5 February 2026	26 March 2026				
Nottinghamshire, Nottingham	Initial decision withdrawn	5 February 2026	26 March 2026				
Oxfordshire	Preferred option announced	5 February 2026	26 March 2026				
Staffordshire, Stoke-on-Trent	Initial decision withdrawn	5 February 2026	26 March 2026				
Warwickshire	Preferred option announced	5 February 2026	26 March 2026				
Worcestershire	Preferred option announced	5 February 2026	26 March 2026				
Cambridgeshire, Peterborough	Awaiting decision	5 February 2026	26 March 2026				

=== Decisions ===
Previous councils and final election				New council and inaugural election		Split districts
Two-tier county		District/unitary		New council and inaugural election		Split districts
Surrey reorganisation area
Surrey	2021	Elmbridge	2024	East Surrey	2026	
Surrey	2021	Epsom and Ewell	2023	East Surrey	2026	
Surrey	2021	Mole Valley	2024	East Surrey	2026	
Surrey	2021	Reigate and Banstead	2024	East Surrey	2026	
Surrey	2021	Tandridge	2024	East Surrey	2026	
Surrey	2021	Guildford	2023	West Surrey	2026	
Surrey	2021	Runnymede	2024	West Surrey	2026	
Surrey	2021	Spelthorne	2023	West Surrey	2026	
Surrey	2021	Surrey Heath	2023	West Surrey	2026	
Surrey	2021	Waverley	2023	West Surrey	2026	
Surrey	2021	Woking	2024	West Surrey	2026	

Ministerial decisions under review or not yet taken
Previous councils		New council	Split districts
Two-tier county	District/unitary	New council	Split districts
Gloucestershire reorganisation area
Gloucestershire	Cheltenham	Gloucestershire (unchanged area)	
Gloucestershire	Cotswold	Gloucestershire (unchanged area)	
Gloucestershire	Forest of Dean	Gloucestershire (unchanged area)	
Gloucestershire	Gloucester	Gloucestershire (unchanged area)	
Gloucestershire	Stroud	Gloucestershire (unchanged area)	
Gloucestershire	Tewkesbury	Gloucestershire (unchanged area)	
Oxfordshire reorganisation area plus West Berkshire
Oxfordshire	Cherwell	North Oxfordshire	15 parishes transferring to Greater Oxford
Oxfordshire	West Oxfordshire	North Oxfordshire	
Oxfordshire	Oxford	Greater Oxford	
Oxfordshire	South Oxfordshire	Ridgeway	25 parishes transferring to Greater Oxford (Note: The July 2026 announcement was for 25 parishes transferred from South Oxfordshire to Greater Oxford. This was modified to 17 in October 2026. This was reverted back to 25 in November 2026.)
Oxfordshire	Vale of White Horse	Ridgeway	9 parishes transferring to Greater Oxford
	West Berkshire	Ridgeway	
Warwickshire reorganisation area
Warwickshire	North Warwickshire	North Warwickshire (expanded area)	
Warwickshire	Nuneaton and Bedworth	North Warwickshire (expanded area)	
Warwickshire	Rugby	North Warwickshire (expanded area)	
Warwickshire	Stratford-on-Avon	South Warwickshire	
Warwickshire	Warwick	South Warwickshire	
Worcestershire reorganisation area
Worcestershire	Bromsgrove	North Worcestershire	
Worcestershire	Redditch	North Worcestershire	
Worcestershire	Wyre Forest	North Worcestershire	
Worcestershire	Malvern Hills	South Worcestershire	
Worcestershire	Worcester	South Worcestershire	
Worcestershire	Wychavon	South Worcestershire	
East Sussex, Brighton and Hove, and West Sussex reorganisation area
East Sussex	Eastbourne	East Sussex (reduced area)	
East Sussex	Hastings	East Sussex (reduced area)	
East Sussex	Rother	East Sussex (reduced area)	
East Sussex	Wealden	East Sussex (reduced area)	
East Sussex	Lewes	East Sussex (reduced area)	4 wards transferring to Brighton and Hove
	Brighton and Hove	Brighton and Hove (expanded area)	
West Sussex	Adur	Awaiting ministerial decision	
West Sussex	Arun	Awaiting ministerial decision	
West Sussex	Chichester	Awaiting ministerial decision	
West Sussex	Crawley	Awaiting ministerial decision	
West Sussex	Horsham	Awaiting ministerial decision	
West Sussex	Mid Sussex	Awaiting ministerial decision	
West Sussex	Worthing	Awaiting ministerial decision	
Cambridgeshire and Peterborough reorganisation area
Cambridgeshire	Cambridge	Awaiting ministerial decision	
Cambridgeshire	East Cambridgeshire	Awaiting ministerial decision	
Cambridgeshire	Fenland	Awaiting ministerial decision	
Cambridgeshire	Huntingdonshire	Awaiting ministerial decision	
Cambridgeshire	South Cambridgeshire	Awaiting ministerial decision	
	Peterborough	Awaiting ministerial decision	
Essex, Southend-on-Sea, and Thurrock reorganisation area
	Thurrock	Awaiting revised ministerial decision	
Essex	Basildon	Awaiting revised ministerial decision	
Essex	Braintree	Awaiting revised ministerial decision	
Essex	Colchester	Awaiting revised ministerial decision	
Essex	Tendring	Awaiting revised ministerial decision	
Essex	Brentwood	Awaiting revised ministerial decision	
Essex	Chelmsford	Awaiting revised ministerial decision	
Essex	Maldon	Awaiting revised ministerial decision	
Essex	Epping Forest	Awaiting revised ministerial decision	
Essex	Harlow	Awaiting revised ministerial decision	
Essex	Uttlesford	Awaiting revised ministerial decision	
Essex	Castle Point	Awaiting revised ministerial decision	
Essex	Rochford	Awaiting revised ministerial decision	
	Southend-on-Sea	Awaiting revised ministerial decision	
Hampshire, Isle of Wight, Portsmouth, and Southampton reorganisation area
	Southampton	Awaiting revised ministerial decision	
Hampshire	Eastleigh	Awaiting revised ministerial decision	
Hampshire	Basingstoke and Deane	Awaiting revised ministerial decision	
Hampshire	Hart	Awaiting revised ministerial decision	
Hampshire	Rushmoor	Awaiting revised ministerial decision	
Hampshire	East Hampshire	Awaiting revised ministerial decision	
Hampshire	New Forest	Awaiting revised ministerial decision	
Hampshire	Test Valley	Awaiting revised ministerial decision	
Hampshire	Winchester	Awaiting revised ministerial decision	
Hampshire	Fareham	Awaiting revised ministerial decision	
Hampshire	Gosport	Awaiting revised ministerial decision	
Hampshire	Havant	Awaiting revised ministerial decision	
	Portsmouth	Awaiting revised ministerial decision	
	Isle of Wight	Awaiting revised ministerial decision	
Norfolk and Suffolk reorganisation area
Norfolk	Breckland	Awaiting revised ministerial decision	
Norfolk	King's Lynn and West Norfolk	Awaiting revised ministerial decision	
Norfolk	Broadland	Awaiting revised ministerial decision	
Norfolk	Great Yarmouth	Awaiting revised ministerial decision	
Norfolk	North Norfolk	Awaiting revised ministerial decision	
Norfolk	South Norfolk	Awaiting revised ministerial decision	
Norfolk	Norwich	Awaiting revised ministerial decision	
Suffolk	Babergh	Awaiting revised ministerial decision	
Suffolk	West Suffolk	Awaiting revised ministerial decision	
Suffolk	Ipswich	Awaiting revised ministerial decision	
Suffolk	East Suffolk	Awaiting revised ministerial decision	
Suffolk	Mid Suffolk	Awaiting revised ministerial decision	
Derbyshire and Derby reorganisation area
Derbyshire	Bolsover	Awaiting revised ministerial decision	
Derbyshire	Chesterfield	Awaiting revised ministerial decision	
Derbyshire	Derbyshire Dales	Awaiting revised ministerial decision	
Derbyshire	High Peak	Awaiting revised ministerial decision	
Derbyshire	North East Derbyshire	Awaiting revised ministerial decision	
Derbyshire	Amber Valley	Awaiting revised ministerial decision	
Derbyshire	Erewash	Awaiting revised ministerial decision	
Derbyshire	South Derbyshire	Awaiting revised ministerial decision	
	Derby	Awaiting revised ministerial decision	
Devon, Plymouth, and Torbay reorganisation area
	Plymouth	Awaiting revised ministerial decision	
Devon	South Hams	Awaiting revised ministerial decision	
Devon	Mid Devon	Awaiting revised ministerial decision	
Devon	North Devon	Awaiting revised ministerial decision	
Devon	Torridge	Awaiting revised ministerial decision	
Devon	West Devon	Awaiting revised ministerial decision	
Devon	East Devon	Awaiting revised ministerial decision	
Devon	Teignbridge	Awaiting revised ministerial decision	
Devon	Exeter	Awaiting revised ministerial decision	
	Torbay	Awaiting revised ministerial decision	
Hertfordshire reorganisation area
Hertfordshire	Broxborne	Awaiting revised ministerial decision	
Hertfordshire	East Hertfordshire	Awaiting revised ministerial decision	
Hertfordshire	North Hertfordshire	Awaiting revised ministerial decision	
Hertfordshire	Welwyn Hatfield	Awaiting revised ministerial decision	
Hertfordshire	Stevenage	Awaiting revised ministerial decision	
Hertfordshire	Dacorum	Awaiting revised ministerial decision	
Hertfordshire	St Albans	Awaiting revised ministerial decision	
Hertfordshire	Hertsmere	Awaiting revised ministerial decision	
Hertfordshire	Three Rivers	Awaiting revised ministerial decision	
Hertfordshire	Watford	Awaiting revised ministerial decision	
Kent and Medway reorganisation area
Kent	Ashford	Awaiting revised ministerial decision	
Kent	Folkestone and Hythe	Awaiting revised ministerial decision	
Kent	Swale	Awaiting revised ministerial decision	
Kent	Canterbury	Awaiting revised ministerial decision	
Kent	Dover	Awaiting revised ministerial decision	
Kent	Thanet	Awaiting revised ministerial decision	
Kent	Maidstone	Awaiting revised ministerial decision	
Kent	Sevenoaks	Awaiting revised ministerial decision	
Kent	Tonbridge and Malling	Awaiting revised ministerial decision	
Kent	Tunbridge Wells	Awaiting revised ministerial decision	
Kent	Dartford	Awaiting revised ministerial decision	
Kent	Gravesham	Awaiting revised ministerial decision	
	Medway	Awaiting revised ministerial decision	
Lancashire, Blackburn with Darwen, and Blackpool reorganisation area
	Blackburn with Darwen	Awaiting revised ministerial decision	
Lancashire	Burnley	Awaiting revised ministerial decision	
Lancashire	Hyndburn	Awaiting revised ministerial decision	
Lancashire	Pendle	Awaiting revised ministerial decision	
Lancashire	Rossendale	Awaiting revised ministerial decision	
Lancashire	Chorley	Awaiting revised ministerial decision	
Lancashire	South Ribble	Awaiting revised ministerial decision	
Lancashire	West Lancashire	Awaiting revised ministerial decision	
Lancashire	Lancaster	Awaiting revised ministerial decision	
Lancashire	Preston	Awaiting revised ministerial decision	
Lancashire	Ribble Valley	Awaiting revised ministerial decision	
Lancashire	Fylde	Awaiting revised ministerial decision	
Lancashire	Wyre	Awaiting revised ministerial decision	
	Blackpool	Awaiting revised ministerial decision	
Leicestershire, Leicester, and Rutland reorganisation area
	Leicester	Awaiting revised ministerial decision	
Leicestershire	Oadby and Wigston	Awaiting revised ministerial decision	
Leicestershire	Blaby	Awaiting revised ministerial decision	
Leicestershire	Charnwood	Awaiting revised ministerial decision	
Leicestershire	Harborough	Awaiting revised ministerial decision	
Leicestershire	Hinckley and Bosworth	Awaiting revised ministerial decision	
Leicestershire	Melton	Awaiting revised ministerial decision	
Leicestershire	North West Leicestershire	Awaiting revised ministerial decision	
	Rutland	Awaiting revised ministerial decision	
Lincolnshire, North East Lincolnshire, and North Lincolnshire reorganisation area
Lincolnshire	Lincoln	Awaiting revised ministerial decision	
Lincolnshire	Boston	Awaiting revised ministerial decision	
Lincolnshire	East Lindsey	Awaiting revised ministerial decision	
Lincolnshire	North Kesteven	Awaiting revised ministerial decision	
Lincolnshire	South Holland	Awaiting revised ministerial decision	
Lincolnshire	South Kesteven	Awaiting revised ministerial decision	
Lincolnshire	West Lindsey	Awaiting revised ministerial decision	
	North East Lincolnshire	Awaiting revised ministerial decision	
	North Lincolnshire	Awaiting revised ministerial decision	
Nottinghamshire and Nottingham reorganisation area
Nottinghamshire	Ashfield	Awaiting revised ministerial decision	
Nottinghamshire	Bassetlaw	Awaiting revised ministerial decision	
Nottinghamshire	Mansfield	Awaiting revised ministerial decision	
Nottinghamshire	Newark and Sherwood	Awaiting revised ministerial decision	
Nottinghamshire	Broxtowe	Awaiting revised ministerial decision	
Nottinghamshire	Gedling	Awaiting revised ministerial decision	
Nottinghamshire	Rushcliffe	Awaiting revised ministerial decision	
	Nottingham	Awaiting revised ministerial decision	
Staffordshire and Stoke-on-Trent reorganisation area
Staffordshire	Cannock Chase	Awaiting revised ministerial decision	
Staffordshire	East Staffordshire	Awaiting revised ministerial decision	
Staffordshire	Lichfield	Awaiting revised ministerial decision	
Staffordshire	South Staffordshire	Awaiting revised ministerial decision	
Staffordshire	Stafford	Awaiting revised ministerial decision	
Staffordshire	Tamworth	Awaiting revised ministerial decision	
Staffordshire	Newcastle-under-Lyme	Awaiting revised ministerial decision	
Staffordshire	Staffordshire Moorlands	Awaiting revised ministerial decision	
	Stoke-on-Trent	Awaiting revised ministerial decision	

== Reorganisation policy ==
The Labour Party returned to power following a landslide victory in the 2024 general election, and in her Autumn budget statement, Chancellor of the Exchequer Rachel Reeves outlined that a forthcoming English Devolution Bill would include plans for "working with councils to move to simpler structures that make sense for their local areas", suggesting that a new round of local government reorganisation could be likely.

The English Devolution White Paper indicated that, where possible, the remaining two-tier local government areas in England—where services are provided by both county councils and district councils—should be reorganised into a smaller number of unitary authorities, where local services are provided by a single council. New unitary councils would be expected to have "a population of 500,000 or more, but there may be exceptions to ensure new structures make sense for an area, including for devolution, and decisions will be on a case-by-case basis". The local government reorganisation programme would cover the 21 remaining ceremonial counties in England with two-tier local government. It would also include neighbouring unitary local government areas "where there is evidence of failure" or where the existing unitary council's "size or boundaries may be hindering their ability to deliver sustainable and high-quality public services".

In February 2026, the House of Commons Library published a local government reorganisation 2026 research briefing.

In 2026, the Secretary of State for Housing, Communities and Local Government Steve Reed committed to completing local government reorganisation "within this Parliament".

In September 2026, the process was paused and put under "rapid review" without a published timetable. The government was threatened with judicial reviews of their decisions in all areas except Gloucestershire, Warwickshire and Worcestershire. In October 2026, decisions for nine further areas were withdrawn, with five areas taken forward (Gloucestershire, Warwickshire and Worcestershire plus Oxfordshire and East Sussex) for a three-week consultation. Elections to the new authorities are expected to take place in May 2028.

== Devolution Priority Programme ==
In November 2024, it was reported that Kent, Essex, Hertfordshire, Surrey, Norfolk, and Suffolk would be included in the first wave of local authority reorganisation with the two-tier system of county councils and district councils being replaced by unitary authorities. However, this turned out to be incorrect and in February 2025 the government announced that the following six areas would join the Devolution Priority Programme:

- Cheshire and Warrington
- Cumbria
- Greater Essex
- Hampshire and the Solent
- Norfolk and Suffolk
- Sussex and Brighton

The Cheshire and Warrington Combined Authority and Cumbria Combined Authority were established on 24 February 2026, with inaugural mayoral elections scheduled for 6 May 2027. These two areas already have a fully unitary system of local government, following local government reorganisation in 2009 and 2023. Cheshire and Warrington Combined Authority is coterminous with the unitary authorities of Cheshire East, Cheshire West and Chester, and Warrington, within the ceremonial county of Cheshire. Cumbria Combined Authority is coterminous with the unitary authorities of Cumberland and Westmorland and Furness, which comprise the ceremonial county of Cumbria.

All existing two-tier and unitary authorities in the Greater Essex, Hampshire and the Solent, Norfolk and Suffolk, and Sussex and Brighton areas were asked to submit final proposals for local government reorganisation to the Secretary of State for Housing, Communities and Local Government by the end of September 2025. The government held statutory consultations on these proposals from 19 November 2025 to 11 January 2026. Decisions on which proposals to implement were expected to be announced by March 2026. Secondary legislation would be required to implement these changes, followed by elections to the new shadow unitary authorities which would be expected to take place on 6 May 2027. The new unitary authorities would then be established on 1 April 2028.

On 31 March 2026, the House of Commons Library published maps of the newly proposed unitary authorities in Essex, Hampshire, Norfolk, and Suffolk, along with a full list of the parishes that would be split from existing non-metropolitan districts under these proposals.

=== Greater Essex ===
Greater Essex was announced as part of the priority programme on 5 February 2025. The May 2025 local elections that would have taken place in Essex and Thurrock were cancelled. Some of the May 2026 local elections in Greater Essex were cancelled and then later reinstated.

Greater Essex Combined County Authority will be coterminous with the ceremonial county of Essex.

==== Essex, Southend-on-Sea, and Thurrock ====
1974–present district boundaries in Essex

Essex is administered by Essex County Council, twelve non-metropolitan districts and two unitary authorities:

1. Uttlesford
2. Braintree
3. Colchester
4. Tendring
5. Harlow
6. Epping Forest
7. Chelmsford
8. Maldon
9. Brentwood
10. Basildon
11. Rochford
12. Castle Point
13. Southend-on-Sea (unitary)
14. Thurrock (unitary)

Proposals
In early December 2024, Basildon councillors proposed a five unitary authority model for the county.

Later in December 2024, it was reported that the government would reorganise Essex into two or three local authorities with over 500,000 people each, with the unitary authorities of Thurrock and Southend-on-Sea to be abolished and merged with other areas of the county and local elections likely to be postponed until 2026. Essex County Council leader Kevin Bentley confirmed that his council would ask the government to postpone local elections for the unitary and two-tier authorities of Essex to prepare for the county's reorganisation.

Proposals to government were submitted by the following councils on 26 September 2025:

Essex, Southend-on-Sea, and Thurrock local government reorganisation proposals
Proposals	Proposed authorities	Composition of authority	Supported by
3 unitary authorities	North Essex	Colchester; Tendring; Braintree; Uttlesford	Essex County Council, Braintree District Council, Epping Forest District Council
3 unitary authorities	Mid Essex	Chelmsford; Harlow; Epping Forest; Brentwood; Maldon	Essex County Council, Braintree District Council, Epping Forest District Council
3 unitary authorities	South Essex	Southend; Basildon; Thurrock; Castle Point; Rochford	Essex County Council, Braintree District Council, Epping Forest District Council
Thurrock proposal 4 unitary authorities	North Essex	Chelmsford; Braintree; Uttlesford	Thurrock Council
Thurrock proposal 4 unitary authorities	East Essex	Colchester; Maldon; Tendring	Thurrock Council
Thurrock proposal 4 unitary authorities	South Essex	Southend; Basildon; Castle Point; Rochford	Thurrock Council
Thurrock proposal 4 unitary authorities	West Essex	Harlow; Epping Forest; Brentwood; Thurrock	Thurrock Council
Rochford proposal 4 unitary authorities	North Essex	Colchester; Braintree; Tendring	Rochford District Council
Rochford proposal 4 unitary authorities	Central Essex	Chelmsford; Brentwood; Maldon; Rochford	Rochford District Council
Rochford proposal 4 unitary authorities	South Essex	Southend; Basildon; Castle Point; Thurrock	Rochford District Council
Rochford proposal 4 unitary authorities	West Essex	Harlow; Epping Forest; Uttlesford	Rochford District Council
5 unitary authorities	South East Essex	Southend-on-Sea; Rochford; Castle Point	Southend-on-Sea City Council, Chelmsford City Council, Basildon Borough Council, Brentwood Borough Council, Castle Point Borough Council, Colchester City Council, Harlow District Council, Maldon District Council, Tendring District Council, Uttlesford District Council
5 unitary authorities	South West Essex	Basildon; Thurrock	Southend-on-Sea City Council, Chelmsford City Council, Basildon Borough Council, Brentwood Borough Council, Castle Point Borough Council, Colchester City Council, Harlow District Council, Maldon District Council, Tendring District Council, Uttlesford District Council
5 unitary authorities	West Essex	Harlow; Epping Forest; Uttlesford	Southend-on-Sea City Council, Chelmsford City Council, Basildon Borough Council, Brentwood Borough Council, Castle Point Borough Council, Colchester City Council, Harlow District Council, Maldon District Council, Tendring District Council, Uttlesford District Council
5 unitary authorities	Mid Essex	Chelmsford; Brentwood; Maldon	Southend-on-Sea City Council, Chelmsford City Council, Basildon Borough Council, Brentwood Borough Council, Castle Point Borough Council, Colchester City Council, Harlow District Council, Maldon District Council, Tendring District Council, Uttlesford District Council
5 unitary authorities	North East Essex	Colchester; Braintree; Tendring	Southend-on-Sea City Council, Chelmsford City Council, Basildon Borough Council, Brentwood Borough Council, Castle Point Borough Council, Colchester City Council, Harlow District Council, Maldon District Council, Tendring District Council, Uttlesford District Council
Note: Modelling by PwC suggests the 3 county council structure, supported by the county council, will net a benefit of £86m.

Government consultation on these four proposals ran from 19 November 2025 to 11 January 2026.

Withdrawn initial decision

New district boundaries in Essex announced in March 2026 (map data)
1. West Essex
2. North East Essex
3. Mid Essex
4. South West Essex
5. South East Essex

On 25 March 2026, the Secretary of State for Housing, Communities and Local Government announced his decision that the ceremonial county of Essex would be reorganised per the five unitary authorities proposal.

1. West Essex, comprising the areas currently covered by Epping Forest, Harlow, and Uttlesford (2024 population 330,792).
2. North East Essex, comprising the areas currently covered by Braintree, Colchester, and Tendring (2024 population 521,285).
3. Mid Essex, comprising the areas currently covered by Brentwood, Chelmsford, and Maldon (2024 population 337,260).
4. South West Essex, comprising the areas currently covered by Basildon and Thurrock (2024 population 374,621).
5. South East Essex, comprising the areas currently covered by Castle Point, Rochford, and Southend-on-Sea (2024 population 365,652).

Essex County Council set out the basis for a legal challenge to the decision in May 2026 and indicated it would continue with judicial review in June 2026. Thurrock Council also threatened to challenge the decision.

The March 2026 ministerial decision was withdrawn on 7 September 2026.

=== Hampshire and the Solent ===
Hampshire and the Solent was announced as part of the priority programme on 5 February 2025. The May 2025 local elections that would have taken place in Hampshire and the Isle of Wight were cancelled.

Hampshire and the Solent Combined County Authority was established on 4 June 2026, with an inaugural mayoral election scheduled for 4 May 2028. This area is coterminous with the ceremonial counties of Hampshire and the Isle of Wight.

==== Hampshire, Isle of Wight, Portsmouth, and Southampton ====
1974–present district boundaries in Hampshire

Hampshire is administered by Hampshire County Council, eleven non-metropolitan districts and two unitary authorities:

1. Test Valley
2. Basingstoke and Deane
3. Hart
4. Rushmoor
5. Winchester
6. East Hampshire
7. New Forest
8. Southampton (unitary)
9. Eastleigh
10. Fareham
11. Gosport
12. Portsmouth (unitary)
13. Havant

The Isle of Wight is administered by a single unitary authority, Isle of Wight Council.

Proposals
In February 2025, the Hampshire County Council leader said that it is unlikely that the unitarisation of the county would follow current district boundaries. The interim proposal submitted by district councils on 21 March 2025 stated that the Isle of Wight should remain its own council rather than being merged with mainland authorities. It also set out analysis for the mainland authorities to be based on the economic geographies of Basingstoke, Winchester, Southampton, and Portsmouth, without making a decision on the number of unitaries.

Initially all 15 authorities (13 Hampshire districts, Hampshire County Council, Isle of Wight Council) formed a group to bring forward a single proposal, assessing eight options for between 2 and 5 unitary authorities across the two ceremonial counties. They ultimately agreed to base their proposals on four mainland councils for Hampshire, with the Isle of Wight remaining unchanged despite falling below the 500,000 mark. However, subsequent to this, Hampshire County Council, East Hampshire District Council, and Gosport Borough Council announced that they were leaving the joint process. Hampshire and East Hampshire began their own process. Gosport fully opposed the local government reorganisation process.

The remaining 12 councils ultimately agreed to work on a business case with three proposals. Each proposal included four Hampshire authorities and the Isle of Wight remaining separate, but they had differing plans for the New Forest. Option 1 and Option 2 were simple mergers of districts, whilst Option 1A included proposed boundary changes. Option 1A proposed including four parishes from the New Forest and three parishes from Test Valley in an authority based around the Southampton area and including three parishes from East Hampshire and one parish from Winchester in an authority based around the Portsmouth area. A shared vision entitled Close enough to be local big enough to stay strong was published by the 12 councils, with each district due to vote on their preferred option in September 2025. In July 2025, a local consultation opened on these three options.

Hampshire County Council and East Hampshire District Council meanwhile proposed three mainland authorities, with the Isle of Wight remaining unchanged.

Proposals to government were submitted by the following councils on 26 September 2025:

Hampshire, Isle of Wight, Portsmouth, and Southampton local government reorganisation proposals
Proposals	Proposed authorities	Composition of authority	Supported by
4 unitary authorities	Mid North Hampshire	Basingstoke and Deane; East Hampshire; Hart; Rushmoor; Winchester	Hampshire County Council, East Hampshire District Council
4 unitary authorities	West Hampshire	Eastleigh; New Forest; Southampton; Test Valley	Hampshire County Council, East Hampshire District Council
4 unitary authorities	South East Hampshire	Fareham; Gosport; Havant; Portsmouth	Hampshire County Council, East Hampshire District Council
4 unitary authorities	Isle of Wight (unchanged)		Hampshire County Council, East Hampshire District Council
Option 1 5 unitary authorities	North Hampshire	Basingstoke and Deane; Hart; Rushmoor	Basingstoke and Deane Borough Council, New Forest District Council, Test Valley Borough Council
Option 1 5 unitary authorities	Mid Hampshire	East Hampshire; New Forest; Test Valley; Winchester	Basingstoke and Deane Borough Council, New Forest District Council, Test Valley Borough Council
Option 1 5 unitary authorities	South West Hampshire	Eastleigh; Southampton	Basingstoke and Deane Borough Council, New Forest District Council, Test Valley Borough Council
Option 1 5 unitary authorities	South East Hampshire	Fareham; Gosport; Havant; Portsmouth	Basingstoke and Deane Borough Council, New Forest District Council, Test Valley Borough Council
Option 1 5 unitary authorities	Isle of Wight (unchanged)		Basingstoke and Deane Borough Council, New Forest District Council, Test Valley Borough Council
Option 1A 5 unitary authorities	North Hampshire	Basingstoke and Deane; Hart; Rushmoor	Eastleigh Borough Council, Fareham Borough Council, Hart District Council, Havant Borough Council, Portsmouth City Council, Rushmoor Borough Council, Southampton City Council
Option 1A 5 unitary authorities	Mid Hampshire	East Hampshire (less 3 parishes); New Forest (less 4 parishes); Test Valley (less 3 parishes); Winchester (less 1 parish)	Eastleigh Borough Council, Fareham Borough Council, Hart District Council, Havant Borough Council, Portsmouth City Council, Rushmoor Borough Council, Southampton City Council
Option 1A 5 unitary authorities	South West Hampshire	Eastleigh; Southampton; 4 parishes from New Forest*; 3 parishes from Test Valley*	Eastleigh Borough Council, Fareham Borough Council, Hart District Council, Havant Borough Council, Portsmouth City Council, Rushmoor Borough Council, Southampton City Council
Option 1A 5 unitary authorities	South East Hampshire	Fareham; Gosport; Havant; Portsmouth; 3 parishes from East Hampshire*; 1 parish from Winchester*	Eastleigh Borough Council, Fareham Borough Council, Hart District Council, Havant Borough Council, Portsmouth City Council, Rushmoor Borough Council, Southampton City Council
Option 1A 5 unitary authorities	Isle of Wight (unchanged)		Eastleigh Borough Council, Fareham Borough Council, Hart District Council, Havant Borough Council, Portsmouth City Council, Rushmoor Borough Council, Southampton City Council
Option 2 5 unitary authorities	North Hampshire	Basingstoke and Deane; Hart; Rushmoor	Winchester City Council
Option 2 5 unitary authorities	Mid Hampshire	East Hampshire; Test Valley; Winchester	Winchester City Council
Option 2 5 unitary authorities	South West Hampshire	Eastleigh; New Forest; Southampton	Winchester City Council
Option 2 5 unitary authorities	South East Hampshire	Fareham; Gosport; Havant; Portsmouth	Winchester City Council
Option 2 5 unitary authorities	Isle of Wight (unchanged)		Winchester City Council
Proposals submitted by Hampshire councils. All include the Isle of Wight remaining separate.
Option 1A split districts: * 4 parishes from New Forest to South West Hampshire: Totton and Eling, Marchwood, Hythe and Dibden, Fawley * 3 parishes from Test Valley to South West Hampshire: Valley Park, Nursling and Rownhams, Chilworth * 3 parishes from East Hampshire to South East Hampshire: Clanfield, Horndean, Rowlands Castle * 1 parish from Winchester to South East Hampshire: Newlands
Note: Gosport Borough Council and Isle of Wight Council did not submit proposals.

Government consultation on these four proposals ran from 19 November 2025 to 11 January 2026.

Withdrawn initial decision

New district boundaries in Hampshire announced in March 2026 (map data)
1. North Hampshire
2. Mid Hampshire
3. South West Hampshire
4. South East Hampshire
5. Isle of Wight (remains unchanged)

On 25 March 2026, the Secretary of State for Housing, Communities and Local Government announced his decision that the ceremonial county of Hampshire would be reorganised into four unitary authorities per Option 1A.

1. North Hampshire, comprising the areas currently covered by Basingstoke and Deane, Hart, and Rushmoor (2024 population 402,023).
2. Mid Hampshire, comprising the areas currently covered by East Hampshire (less 3 parishes), New Forest (less 4 parishes), Test Valley (less 3 parishes), and Winchester (less 1 parish) (2024 population 465,630).
3. South West Hampshire, comprising the areas currently covered by Eastleigh, Southampton, 4 parishes from New Forest, and 3 parishes from Test Valley (2024 population 487,060).
4. South East Hampshire, comprising the areas currently covered by Fareham, Gosport, Havant, Portsmouth, 3 parishes from East Hampshire, and 1 parish from Winchester (2024 population 566,246).

This decision confirms that the Isle of Wight unitary authority will remain unchanged.

In June 2026, Hampshire county council confirmed it would challenge the decision through a judicial review.

The March 2026 ministerial decision was withdrawn on 7 September 2026.

=== Norfolk and Suffolk ===
Norfolk and Suffolk was announced as part of the priority programme on 5 February 2025. The May 2025 local elections that would have taken place in Norfolk and Suffolk were cancelled. The elections in May 2026 were initially cancelled, but were later reinstated.

Norfolk and Suffolk Combined County Authority will be coterminous with the ceremonial counties of Norfolk and Suffolk.

==== Norfolk ====
1974–present district boundaries in Norfolk

Norfolk is administered by Norfolk County Council and seven non-metropolitan districts:

1. Norwich
2. South Norfolk
3. Great Yarmouth
4. Broadland
5. North Norfolk
6. King's Lynn and West Norfolk
7. Breckland

Proposals
Proposals to government were submitted by the following councils on 26 September 2025:

Norfolk local government reorganisation proposals
Proposals	Proposed authorities	Composition of authority	Supported by	Proposal maps
1 unitary authority	Norfolk	Breckland; Broadland; Great Yarmouth; King's Lynn and West Norfolk; North Norfolk; Norwich; South Norfolk	Norfolk County Council	
2 unitary authorities	West and North Norfolk	Breckland; King's Lynn and West Norfolk; North Norfolk	South Norfolk District Council	
2 unitary authorities	Norwich and East Norfolk	Broadland; Great Yarmouth; Norwich; South Norfolk	South Norfolk District Council	
3 unitary authorities	West Norfolk	Breckland; King's Lynn and West Norfolk; 9 parishes from South Norfolk	Breckland District Council, Broadland District Council, Great Yarmouth Borough Council, King’s Lynn and West Norfolk Borough Council, North Norfolk District Council, Norwich City Council	
3 unitary authorities	Greater Norwich	Norwich; 19 parishes from Broadland; 16 parishes from South Norfolk	Breckland District Council, Broadland District Council, Great Yarmouth Borough Council, King’s Lynn and West Norfolk Borough Council, North Norfolk District Council, Norwich City Council	
3 unitary authorities	East Norfolk	Great Yarmouth; North Norfolk; Broadland (less 19 parishes); South Norfolk (less 25 parishes)	Breckland District Council, Broadland District Council, Great Yarmouth Borough Council, King’s Lynn and West Norfolk Borough Council, North Norfolk District Council, Norwich City Council	
Note: In February 2026, the leader of Norfolk County Council said the authority intended to withdraw from the reorganisation process.

Government consultation on these three Norfolk proposals ran from 19 November 2025 to 11 January 2026.

Withdrawn initial decision

New district boundaries in Norfolk announced in March 2026

On 25 March 2026, the Secretary of State for Housing, Communities and Local Government announced his decision that the ceremonial county of Norfolk would be reorganised per the three unitary authorities proposal.

1. West Norfolk, comprising the areas currently covered by Breckland, King's Lynn and West Norfolk, and 9 parishes from South Norfolk (2024 population 309,737).
2. East Norfolk, comprising the areas currently covered by Great Yarmouth, North Norfolk, Broadland (less 19 parishes), and South Norfolk (less 25 parishes) (2024 population 340,956).
3. Greater Norwich, comprising the areas currently covered by Norwich, 19 parishes from Broadland, and 16 parishes from South Norfolk (2024 population 289,666).

Norfolk County Council began a judicial review of the decision in June 2026.

The March 2026 ministerial decision was withdrawn on 7 September 2026.

==== Suffolk ====
2019–present district boundaries in Suffolk

Suffolk is administered by Suffolk County Council and five non-metropolitan districts:

1. Ipswich
2. East Suffolk
3. Mid Suffolk
4. Babergh
5. West Suffolk

Proposals
Proposals to government were submitted by the following councils on 26 September 2025:

Suffolk local government reorganisation proposals
Proposals	Proposed authorities	Composition of authority	Supported by	Proposal maps
1 unitary authority	Suffolk	Babergh; East Suffolk; Ipswich; Mid Suffolk; West Suffolk	Suffolk County Council	
3 unitary authorities	Ipswich and Southern Suffolk	Ipswich; 31 parishes from Babergh; 25 parishes from East Suffolk; 8 parishes from Mid Suffolk	Babergh District Council, East Suffolk District Council, Ipswich Borough Council, Mid Suffolk District Council, West Suffolk District Council	
3 unitary authorities	Western Suffolk:	West Suffolk; Babergh (less 31 parishes); 21 parishes from Mid Suffolk	Babergh District Council, East Suffolk District Council, Ipswich Borough Council, Mid Suffolk District Council, West Suffolk District Council	
3 unitary authorities	Central and Eastern Suffolk	East Suffolk (less 25 parishes); Mid Suffolk (less 29 parishes)	Babergh District Council, East Suffolk District Council, Ipswich Borough Council, Mid Suffolk District Council, West Suffolk District Council	

Government consultation on these two Suffolk proposals ran from 19 November 2025 to 11 January 2026.

Withdrawn initial decision

New district boundaries in Suffolk announced in March 2026

On 25 March 2026, the Secretary of State for Housing, Communities and Local Government announced his decision that the ceremonial county of Suffolk would be reorganised per the three unitary authorities proposal.

1. Western Suffolk, comprising the areas currently covered by West Suffolk, Babergh (less 31 parishes), and 21 parishes from Mid Suffolk (2024 population 268,568).
2. Central and Eastern Suffolk, comprising the areas currently covered by East Suffolk (less 25 parishes) and Mid Suffolk (less 29 parishes) (2024 population 260,532).
3. Ipswich and South Suffolk, comprising the areas currently covered by Ipswich, 31 parishes from Babergh, 25 parishes from East Suffolk, and 8 parishes from Mid Suffolk (2024 population 257,131).

Suffolk County Council began a judicial review of the decision in June 2026.

The March 2026 ministerial decision was withdrawn on 7 September 2026.

=== Sussex and Brighton ===
Sussex and Brighton was announced as part of the priority programme on 5 February 2025. The May 2025 local elections that would have taken place in East Sussex and West Sussex were cancelled. The elections in May 2026 were initially cancelled, but were later reinstated.

Sussex and Brighton Combined County Authority was established on 26 March 2026, with an inaugural mayoral election scheduled for 4 May 2028. This area is coterminous with the ceremonial counties of East Sussex and West Sussex.

==== East Sussex and Brighton and Hove ====
1997–present district boundaries in East Sussex

East Sussex is administered by East Sussex County Council, five non-metropolitan districts and one unitary authority:

1. Brighton and Hove (unitary)
2. Lewes
3. Wealden
4. Eastbourne
5. Rother
6. Hastings

==== West Sussex ====
1974–present district boundaries in West Sussex

West Sussex is administered by West Sussex County Council and seven non-metropolitan districts:

1. Worthing
2. Arun
3. Chichester
4. Horsham
5. Crawley
6. Mid Sussex
7. Adur

Proposals (East Sussex, Brighton and Hove, and West Sussex)
East Sussex County Council covers a population of 550,000 and has proposed a direct replacement of the county council and five district councils with a single unitary authority. Brighton and Hove City Council, which is already a unitary authority with a population of 283,870, proposed that the border between itself and the new East Sussex unitary should be altered to include East Saltdean, Telscombe Cliffs, and Peacehaven within Brighton and Hove (the area coterminous with the Lewes parishes of Telscombe and Peacehaven). They consulted locally on whether to propose expanding further into either or both of the Lewes parish of Newhaven and the Lewes ward of Kingston (which comprises the parishes of Piddinghoe, Southease, Rodmell, Iford, Kingston near Lewes, St Ann (Without), and Falmer).

West Sussex County Council covers a population of 900,000 and originally proposed either one large or two smaller unitary authorities, dependent on whether Crawley remains in West Sussex or is moved to Surrey, and whether Brighton and Hove would expand its territory.

Proposals to government were submitted by the following councils on 26 September 2025:

East Sussex, Brighton and Hove, and West Sussex local government reorganisation proposals
Proposals	Proposed authorities	Composition of authority	Supported by
Proposals for West Sussex
1 unitary authority	West Sussex	Adur; Arun; Chichester; Crawley; Horsham; Mid Sussex; Worthing	West Sussex County Council
2 unitary authorities	"Unitary A"	Adur; Arun; Chichester; Worthing	Adur District Council, Arun District Council, Chichester District Council, Crawley Borough Council, Horsham District Council, Mid Sussex District Council, Worthing Borough Council
2 unitary authorities	"Unitary B"	Crawley; Horsham; Mid Sussex	Adur District Council, Arun District Council, Chichester District Council, Crawley Borough Council, Horsham District Council, Mid Sussex District Council, Worthing Borough Council
Proposal for East Sussex and Brighton and Hove
2 unitary authorities	Brighton and Hove (unchanged)		East Sussex County Council, Eastbourne Borough Council, Hastings Borough Council, Lewes District Council, Rother District Council
2 unitary authorities	East Sussex	Lewes; Eastbourne; Wealden; Rother; Hastings	East Sussex County Council, Eastbourne Borough Council, Hastings Borough Council, Lewes District Council, Rother District Council
Pan-Sussex proposal
5 unitary authorities	"Unitary A"	Brighton and Hove; 4 wards and 1 part-ward from Lewes (coterminous with 3 parishes)	Brighton and Hove City Council
5 unitary authorities	"Unitary B"	Eastbourne; Hastings; Rother; 7 wards from Lewes (coterminous with 2 parishes); 9 wards from Wealden (coterminous with 11 parishes and 1 part-parish)	Brighton and Hove City Council
5 unitary authorities	"Unitary C"	Mid Sussex; Lewes (less 11 wards and 1 part-ward); Wealden (less 9 wards)	Brighton and Hove City Council
5 unitary authorities	"Unitary D"	Chichester; Crawley; Horsham	Brighton and Hove City Council
5 unitary authorities	"Unitary E"	Adur; Arun; Worthing	Brighton and Hove City Council
Proposals submitted by Sussex councils.
Note: Wealden District Council did not submit a proposal.

Government consultation on these four proposals ran from 19 November 2025 to 11 January 2026.

On 25 March 2026, the Secretary of State for Housing, Communities and Local Government announced that he had not yet taken a decision on the proposals for East Sussex, Brighton and Hove, and West Sussex and would undertake a further technical consultation after the 2026 United Kingdom local elections to seek comments on a newly suggested proposal for the following 4 council structure across the whole Sussex area:

East Sussex, Brighton and Hove, and West Sussex proposal for further technical consultation
Proposals	Proposed authorities	Composition of authority
Pan-Sussex proposal
4 unitary authorities	"Unitary A"	Eastbourne; Hastings; Rother; Wealden; Lewes (less 4 wards and 1 part-ward)
4 unitary authorities	"Unitary B"	Adur; Arun; Worthing
4 unitary authorities	"Unitary C"	Brighton and Hove; 4 wards and 1 part-ward from Lewes (coterminous with 3 parishes)
4 unitary authorities	"Unitary D"	Chichester; Crawley; Horsham; Mid Sussex
March 2026 proposal.

This government further technical consultation ran from 12 May 2026 to 15 June 2026.

On 16 July 2026, the Secretary of State announced that he had not yet taken a decision on the proposals for West Sussex. He did, however, rule-out the pan-Sussex five unitary option proposed by Brighton and Hove City Council.

Initial decision under review (East Sussex and Brighton and Hove)

New district boundaries in East Sussex announced in July 2026 (map data)
1. Brighton and Hove
2. East Sussex

On 16 July 2026, the Secretary of State for Housing, Communities and Local Government announced his decision that the ceremonial county of East Sussex would be reorganised into two unitary authorities per the Secretary of State’s proposal for further technical consultation, with the exception of one part-ward from Lewes. Falmer parish (a part of Kingston ward) would instead be in the new East Sussex authority.

1. Brighton and Hove, comprising the areas currently covered by Brighton and Hove and 4 wards from Lewes (coterminous with 2 parishes) (2024 population 307,521).
2. East Sussex, comprising the areas currently covered by Eastbourne, Hastings, Rother, Wealden, and Lewes (less 4 wards) (2024 population 537,231).

East Sussex County Council and Lewes District Council applied for judicial review of the decision.

The July 2026 ministerial decision was paused and subjected to a review on 7 September 2026. On 29 October 2026, the government announced it was "minded" to go ahead with the reorganisation, subject to a three-week period of consultation.

== Surrey ==
Surrey was not part of the Devolution Priority Programme announced on 5 February 2025. However, the need to reorganise local government was considered urgent enough that the May 2025 local elections that would have taken place in Surrey were cancelled. The government intended that Surrey would move to a unitary structure faster than other areas, with the new councils to become operational in 2027.

1974–2027 district boundaries in Surrey

The Surrey invitation area is coterminous with the ceremonial county of Surrey. It is currently administered by Surrey County Council and eleven non-metropolitan districts:

1. Spelthorne
2. Runnymede
3. Surrey Heath
4. Woking
5. Elmbridge
6. Guildford
7. Waverley
8. Mole Valley
9. Epsom and Ewell
10. Reigate and Banstead
11. Tandridge

=== Proposals ===
Proposals to government were submitted by all 12 of the affected councils on 9th May 2025:

Surrey local government reorganisation proposals
Proposals	Proposed authorities	Composition of authority	Supported by	Proposal maps
2 unitary authorities	West Surrey	Guildford; Runnymede; Spelthorne; Surrey Heath; Waverley; Woking	1. Elmbridge Borough Council, 2. Mole Valley District Council, 3. Surrey County Council	
2 unitary authorities	East Surrey	Elmbridge; Epsom and Ewell; Mole Valley; Reigate and Banstead; Tandridge	1. Elmbridge Borough Council, 2. Mole Valley District Council, 3. Surrey County Council	
3 unitary authorities	North Surrey	Elmbridge; Runnymede; Spelthorne	1. Epsom and Ewell Borough Council, 2. Guildford Borough Council, 3. Reigate and Banstead Borough Council, 4. Runnymede Borough Council, 5. Spelthorne Borough Council, 6. Surrey Heath Borough Council, 7. Tandridge District Council, 8. Waverley Borough Council, 9. Woking Borough Council	
3 unitary authorities	West Surrey	Guildford; Surrey Heath; Waverley; Woking	1. Epsom and Ewell Borough Council, 2. Guildford Borough Council, 3. Reigate and Banstead Borough Council, 4. Runnymede Borough Council, 5. Spelthorne Borough Council, 6. Surrey Heath Borough Council, 7. Tandridge District Council, 8. Waverley Borough Council, 9. Woking Borough Council	
3 unitary authorities	East Surrey	Epsom and Ewell; Mole Valley; Reigate and Banstead, Tandridge	1. Epsom and Ewell Borough Council, 2. Guildford Borough Council, 3. Reigate and Banstead Borough Council, 4. Runnymede Borough Council, 5. Spelthorne Borough Council, 6. Surrey Heath Borough Council, 7. Tandridge District Council, 8. Waverley Borough Council, 9. Woking Borough Council	

Government consultation on these two proposals ran from 17 June 2025 to 5 August 2025.

=== Decision ===
New district boundaries in Surrey from 1 April 2027 (map data)
1. West Surrey
2. East Surrey

On 28 October 2025, the Secretary of State for Housing, Communities and Local Government announced his decision that the ceremonial county of Surrey would be reorganised per the two unitary authorities proposal.

1. West Surrey, comprising the areas currently covered by Guildford, Runnymede, Spelthorne, Surrey Heath, Waverley, and Woking (2024 population 685,006).
2. East Surrey, comprising the areas currently covered by Elmbridge, Epsom and Ewell, Mole Valley, Reigate and Banstead, and Tandridge (2024 population 563,643).

Outcome
Secondary legislation was made on 9 March 2026. The first elections to the new authorities were in May 2026, with vesting day on 1 April 2027.

== Remaining two-tier areas ==
In February 2025, the government wrote to the councils in the 14 remaining 2-tier areas and neighbouring small unitary councils, asking for proposals to be submitted to the Secretary of State for Housing, Communities and Local Government by the end of November 2025. The government held statutory consultations on these proposals from 5 February 2026 to 26 March 2026. Decisions on which proposals to implement were announced on 16 July 2026 for most of the areas. Secondary legislation would be required to implement these changes, followed by elections to the new shadow unitary authorities and the new authorities would then be established a year later.

=== Cambridgeshire and Peterborough ===
1974–present district boundaries in Cambridgeshire

The Cambridgeshire and Peterborough invitation area is coterminous with the ceremonial county of Cambridgeshire. It is administered by Cambridgeshire County Council, five non-metropolitan districts and one unitary authority:

1. Peterborough (unitary)
2. Fenland
3. Huntingdonshire
4. East Cambridgeshire
5. South Cambridgeshire
6. Cambridge

==== Proposals ====
In November 2024, the former leader of Fenland District Council, and the leader of the Liberal Democrat group on East Cambridgeshire District Council urged that Cambridgeshire be included in the next round of local government reorganisation.

Following the English Devolution and Community Empowerment Bill in December 2024 and the subsequent invitation to councils to consider boundaries for the new Unitaries, councils began their deliberations as to their preferred models.

1. On 21 October, Cambridgeshire County Council's decided on Option A.
2. On 7 November, Fenland agreed to support Option D.
3. On 12 November, the City of Peterborough Council also backed Option D, confirmed by its Cabinet meeting on 18 November.
4. On 19 November, Huntingdonshire District Council agreed that Option E was its favoured choice. This is subject to a Council Cabinet meeting on 24 November.
5. On 20 November, City of Cambridge backed Option B.
6. Also on 20 November, East Cambridgeshire chose Option B.
7. On 24 November, South Cambridgeshire adopted Option B by 21 votes to 6.

While MPs are not part of the current consultation process, the MP for Huntingdon Ben Obese-Jecty raised the matter in Parliament and expressed his support for Option E.

Proposals to government were submitted by the following councils on 28 November 2025:

Cambridgeshire and Peterborough local government reorganisation proposals
Proposals	Proposed authorities	Composition of authority	Supported by	Proposal maps
Option A 2 unitary authorities	"Northwest"	Peterborough; Fenland; Huntingdonshire	Cambridgeshire County Council	
Option A 2 unitary authorities	"Southeast"	Cambridge; East Cambridgeshire; South Cambridgeshire	Cambridgeshire County Council	
Option B 2 unitary authorities	North Cambridgeshire and Peterborough	Peterborough; Huntingdonshire; East Cambridgeshire; Fenland	Cambridge City Council, East Cambridgeshire District Council, South Cambridgeshire District Council	
Option B 2 unitary authorities	Greater Cambridge	Cambridge; South Cambridgeshire	Cambridge City Council, East Cambridgeshire District Council, South Cambridgeshire District Council	
Option D 3 unitary authorities	Greater Peterborough	Peterborough; 9 wards from Huntingdonshire	Peterborough City Council, Fenland District Council	
Option D 3 unitary authorities	Mid Cambridgeshire	Fenland; East Cambridgeshire; Huntingdonshire (less 9 wards)	Peterborough City Council, Fenland District Council	
Option D 3 unitary authorities	Greater Cambridge	Cambridge; South Cambridgeshire	Peterborough City Council, Fenland District Council	
Option E 3 unitary authorities	"North"	Peterborough; Fenland; East Cambridgeshire	Huntingdonshire District Council	
Option E 3 unitary authorities	"South"	Cambridge; South Cambridgeshire	Huntingdonshire District Council	
Option E 3 unitary authorities	Huntingdonshire	Huntingdonshire	Huntingdonshire District Council	

Government consultation on these four proposals ran from 5 February 2026 to 26 March 2026.

Awaiting decision for Cambridgeshire and Peterborough authorities

On 16 July 2026, the Secretary of State for Housing, Communities and Local Government announced that he had not yet taken a decision on the proposals for Cambridgeshire and Peterborough.

=== Derbyshire and Derby ===
1974–present district boundaries in Derbyshire

The Derbyshire and Derby invitation area is coterminous with the ceremonial county of Derbyshire. It is administered by Derbyshire County Council, eight non-metropolitan districts and one unitary authority:

1. High Peak
2. Derbyshire Dales
3. South Derbyshire
4. Erewash
5. Amber Valley
6. North East Derbyshire
7. Chesterfield
8. Bolsover
9. Derby (unitary)

==== Proposals ====
In August 2025, Derbyshire's district, borough, and city councils agreed on three options for further consideration, referred to as Option A, Option B, and Option C. All three proposals would see the area covered by two authorities, with one council covering the southern part of the county (including the city of Derby), and the other covering the northern part of the county.

Eight of Derbyshire’s councils ultimately agreed to jointly propose two unitary councils, a "Northern Derbyshire" authority and a "Southern Derbyshire" authority. This proposal included four different sub-proposals because the councils disagreed on plans for Amber Valley. Derbyshire County Council meanwhile proposed a single unitary authority covering the whole county area, including Derby.

Proposals to government were submitted by the following councils on 28 November 2025:

Derbyshire and Derby local government reorganisation proposals
Proposals	Proposed authorities	Composition of authority	Supported by	Proposal maps
1 unitary authority	Derbyshire	Amber Valley; Bolsover; Chesterfield; Derby; Derbyshire Dales; Erewash; High Peak; North East Derbyshire; South Derbyshire	Derbyshire County Council	
Proposal A 2 unitary authorities	Northern Derbyshire	Amber Valley; Bolsover; Chesterfield; Derbyshire Dales; High Peak; North East Derbyshire	Amber Valley Borough Council	
Proposal A 2 unitary authorities	Southern Derbyshire	Derby; Erewash; South Derbyshire	Amber Valley Borough Council	
Proposal B 2 unitary authorities	Northern Derbyshire	Bolsover; Chesterfield; Derbyshire Dales; High Peak; North East Derbyshire	South Derbyshire District Council	
Proposal B 2 unitary authorities	Southern Derbyshire	Amber Valley; Derby; Erewash; South Derbyshire	South Derbyshire District Council	
Proposal A1 2 unitary authorities	Northern Derbyshire	Bolsover; Chesterfield; Derbyshire Dales; High Peak; North East Derbyshire; Amber Valley (less 14 parishes)	Bolsover District Council, North East Derbyshire District Council	
Proposal A1 2 unitary authorities	Southern Derbyshire	Derby; Erewash; South Derbyshire; 14 parishes from Amber Valley*	Bolsover District Council, North East Derbyshire District Council	
Proposal B1 2 unitary authorities	Northern Derbyshire	Bolsover; Chesterfield; Derbyshire Dales; High Peak; North East Derbyshire; Amber Valley (less 14 parishes)	Chesterfield Borough Council, Derby City Council, Erewash Borough Council, High Peak Borough Council	
Proposal B1 2 unitary authorities	Southern Derbyshire	Derby; Erewash; South Derbyshire; 14 parishes from Amber Valley*	Chesterfield Borough Council, Derby City Council, Erewash Borough Council, High Peak Borough Council	
Proposal A1 Amber Valley split: * 14 parishes from Amber Valley to Southern Derbyshire: Duffield, Holbrook, Horsley, Horsley Woodhouse, Kedleston, Kirk Langley, Mackworth, Mapperley, Quarndon, Ravensdale Park, Smalley, Turnditch, Weston Underwood, Windley
Proposal B1 Amber Valley split: * 14 parishes from Amber Valley to Southern Derbyshire: Belper, Denby, Duffield, Holbrook, Horsley, Horsley Woodhouse, Kedleston, Kilburn, Kirk Langley, Mackworth, Mapperley, Quarndon, Shipley, Smalley
Note: Derbyshire Dales District Council did not submit a proposal.

Government consultation on these five proposals ran from 5 February 2026 to 26 March 2026.

==== Withdrawn initial decision ====
New district boundaries in Derbyshire announced in July 2026 (map data)
1. Derbyshire North
2. Derbyshire South

On 16 July 2026, the Secretary of State for Housing, Communities and Local Government announced his decision that the ceremonial county of Derbyshire would be reorganised into two unitary authorities per Proposal B1.

1. Derbyshire North, comprising the areas currently covered by Bolsover, Chesterfield, Derbyshire Dales, High Peak, North East Derbyshire, and Amber Valley (less 14 parishes) (2024 population 545,201).
2. Derbyshire South, comprising the areas currently covered by Derby, Erewash, South Derbyshire, and 14 parishes from Amber Valley (2024 population 551,325).

Amber Valley Borough Council initiated legal action against the decision.

The July 2026 ministerial decision was paused and subjected to a review on 7 September 2026. The decision was withdrawn on 29 October 2026.

=== Devon, Plymouth, and Torbay ===
1974–present district boundaries in Devon

The Devon, Plymouth, and Torbay invitation area is coterminous with the ceremonial county of Devon. It is administered by Devon County Council, eight non-metropolitan districts and two unitary authorities:

1. North Devon
2. Torridge
3. Mid Devon
4. East Devon
5. Exeter
6. West Devon
7. Teignbridge
8. Plymouth (unitary)
9. South Hams
10. Torbay (unitary)

==== Proposals ====
In September 2025, Devon County Council proposed that the entire area covered by the county council become a single unitary authority, with Plymouth and Torbay remaining as unitary authorities on their existing borders. This plan was critisiced by Exeter City Council, who proposed that Exeter be expanded to become a unitary authority of its own. Plymouth City Council also proposed expanding into areas currently covered by the county council, whilst Torbay had yet to decide on a final proposal. Devon's other district councils proposed an alternative structure, known as the "1-4-5 plan", which envisages that Plymouth would continue as a unitary authority on its existing boundary, whilst the remainder of the county (including Torbay) would be divided two authorities.

Proposals to government were submitted by the following councils on 28 November 2025:

Devon, Plymouth, and Torbay local government reorganisation proposals
Proposals	Proposed authorities	Composition of authority	Supported by	Proposal maps
County Council Proposal; 3 unitary authorities	Plymouth (unchanged)		Devon County Council	
County Council Proposal; 3 unitary authorities	Torbay (unchanged)		Devon County Council	
County Council Proposal; 3 unitary authorities	Devon	East Devon; Exeter; Mid Devon; North Devon; South Hams; Teignbridge; Torridge; West Devon	Devon County Council	
District Councils Main Proposal; 3 unitary authorities	Exeter and Northern Devon	East Devon; Exeter; Mid Devon; North Devon; Torridge	South Hams District Council, Teignbridge District Council, West Devon Borough Council	
District Councils Main Proposal; 3 unitary authorities	Plymouth (unchanged)		South Hams District Council, Teignbridge District Council, West Devon Borough Council	
District Councils Main Proposal; 3 unitary authorities	Torbay and Southern Devon	South Hams; Teignbridge; Torbay; West Devon	South Hams District Council, Teignbridge District Council, West Devon Borough Council	
District Councils Modified Proposal; 3 unitary authorities	Exeter and Northern Devon	East Devon; Exeter; Mid Devon; North Devon; Torridge	East Devon District Council, Mid Devon District Council, North Devon Council, Torridge District Council	
District Councils Modified Proposal; 3 unitary authorities	Plymouth (expanded)	Plymouth; 4 part-parishes from South Hams	East Devon District Council, Mid Devon District Council, North Devon Council, Torridge District Council	
District Councils Modified Proposal; 3 unitary authorities	Torbay and Southern Devon	Teignbridge; Torbay; West Devon; South Hams (less 4 part-parishes)	East Devon District Council, Mid Devon District Council, North Devon Council, Torridge District Council	
Exeter & Plymouth Proposal; 4 unitary authorities	Exeter (expanded)	Exeter; 28 parishes from East Devon; 6 parishes from Mid Devon; 15 parishes from Teignbridge	Exeter City Council, Plymouth City Council	
Exeter & Plymouth Proposal; 4 unitary authorities	Plymouth (expanded)	Plymouth; 13 parishes from South Hams	Exeter City Council, Plymouth City Council	
Exeter & Plymouth Proposal; 4 unitary authorities	Torbay (expanded)	Torbay; 5 parishes from South Hams; 16 parishes from Teignbridge	Exeter City Council, Plymouth City Council	
Exeter & Plymouth Proposal; 4 unitary authorities	Devon Coast and Countryside	North Devon; Torridge; West Devon; East Devon (less 28 parishes); Mid Devon (less 6 parishes); South Hams (less 18 parishes); Teignbridge (less 31 parishes)	Exeter City Council, Plymouth City Council	
Torbay Proposal; 4 unitary authorities	Exeter (expanded)	Exeter; 28 parishes from East Devon; 6 parishes from Mid Devon; 15 parishes from Teignbridge	Torbay Council	
Torbay Proposal; 4 unitary authorities	Plymouth (expanded)	Plymouth, 13 parishes from South Hams	Torbay Council	
Torbay Proposal; 4 unitary authorities	Torbay (unchanged)		Torbay Council	
Torbay Proposal; 4 unitary authorities	Rural Devon Coast and Countryside	North Devon; Torridge; West Devon; East Devon (less 28 parishes); Mid Devon (less 6 parishes); South Hams (less 13 parishes); Teignbridge (less 15 parishes)	Torbay Council	

Government consultation on these five proposals ran from 5 February 2026 to 26 March 2026.

==== Withdrawn initial decision ====
New district boundaries in Devon announced in July 2026

On 16 July 2026, the Secretary of State for Housing, Communities and Local Government announced his decision that the ceremonial county of Devon would be reorganised into four unitary authorities as proposed by Exeter and Plymouth.

1. Exeter, comprising the areas currently covered by Exeter, 28 parishes from East Devon, 6 parishes from Mid Devon, and 15 parishes from Teignbridge (2024 population 264,574).
2. Greater Plymouth, comprising the areas currently covered by Plymouth and 13 parishes from South Hams (2024 population 307,315).
3. Torbay and South Devon, comprising the areas currently covered by Torbay, 5 parishes from South Hams, and 16 parishes from Teignbridge (2024 population 222,822).
4. Devon, comprising the areas currently covered by North Devon, Torridge, West Devon, East Devon (less 28 parishes), Mid Devon (less 6 parishes), South Hams (less 18 parishes), and Teignbridge (less 31 parishes) (2024 population 459,795).

Devon County Council initiated a judicial review against the decision.

The July 2026 ministerial decision was paused and subjected to a review on 7 September 2026. The decision was withdrawn on 29 October 2026.

=== Gloucestershire ===
1996–present district boundaries in Gloucestershire

The Gloucestershire invitation area is coterminous with the Gloucestershire county council area. It forms the majority of the ceremonial county of Gloucestershire. Gloucestershire ceremonial county is administered by Gloucestershire County Council, six non-metropolitan districts and one unitary authority:

1. Tewkesbury
2. Forest of Dean
3. Gloucester
4. Cheltenham
5. Stroud
6. Cotswold
7. South Gloucestershire (unitary)

==== Proposals ====
South Gloucestershire forms part of the West of England Combined Authority. It is outside of the government's Gloucestershire invitation area and is not expected to undergo any changes. For the remainder of the county (the county council area) as of August 2025 three options were under consideration:

- One council covering the whole county council area.
- Two councils with an eastern authority and a western authority.
- Two councils with a "Greater Gloucester" authority and another authority covering the remainder of the county council area.

Proposals to government were submitted by the following councils on 28 November 2025:

Gloucestershire county council area local government reorganisation proposals
Proposals	Proposed authorities	Composition of authority	Supported by	Proposal maps
1 unitary authority	Gloucestershire	Cheltenham; Cotswold; Forest of Dean; Gloucester; Stroud; Tewkesbury	Cotswold District Council, Gloucestershire County Council, Stroud District Council, Tewkesbury Borough Council	
Cheltenham proposal 2 unitary authorities	East Gloucestershire	Cheltenham; Cotswold; Tewkesbury	Cheltenham Borough Council	
Cheltenham proposal 2 unitary authorities	West Gloucestershire	Forest of Dean; Gloucester; Stroud	Cheltenham Borough Council	
Gloucester proposal 2 unitary authorities	Greater Gloucester City	Gloucester; 1 parish from Forest of Dean; 8 parishes from Stroud; 12 parishes from Tewkesbury	Gloucester City Council	
Gloucester proposal 2 unitary authorities	Gloucestershire	Cheltenham; Cotswold; Forest of Dean (less 1 parish); Stroud (less 8 parishes); Tewkesbury (less 12 parishes)	Gloucester City Council	
Note: Forest of Dean District Council did not submit a proposal (nor did South Gloucestershire Council which is outside of the government's invitation area).

Government consultation on these three proposals ran from 5 February 2026 to 26 March 2026.

==== Initial decision under review ====
New district boundaries in Gloucestershire announced in July 2026 (map data)
1. Gloucestershire
2. South Gloucestershire

On 16 July 2026, the Secretary of State for Housing, Communities and Local Government announced his decision that the Gloucestershire county council area would be reorganised per the single unitary authority proposal.

This decision confirms that South Gloucestershire unitary authority will remain unchanged and the ceremonial county of Gloucestershire would comprise two unitary authorities.

1. Gloucestershire, comprising the areas currently covered by Cheltenham, Cotswold, Forest of Dean, Gloucester, Stroud, and Tewkesbury (2024 population 669,380).
2. South Gloucestershire (unchanged).

Gloucestershire is one of three areas where no legal challenge to the decision has been threatened.

The July 2026 ministerial decision was paused and subjected to a review on 7 September 2026. On 29 October 2026, the government announced it was "minded" to go ahead with the reorganisation, subject to a three-week period of consultation.

=== Hertfordshire ===
Hertfordshire did not bid to become part of the priority programme.

1974–present district boundaries in Hertfordshire

The Hertfordshire invitation area is coterminous with the ceremonial county of Hertfordshire. It is administered by Hertfordshire County Council and ten non-metropolitan districts:

1. North Hertfordshire
2. Stevenage
3. East Hertfordshire
4. Dacorum
5. St Albans
6. Welwyn Hatfield
7. Broxbourne
8. Three Rivers
9. Watford
10. Hertsmere

==== Proposals ====
In May 2025, the leaders of all eleven Hertfordshire councils jointly agreed that a single unitary authority covering the entire county – an area with a population of 1.2 million – would be too remote to maintain democratic accountability. The councils jointly proposed three options:

- Option A: Two authorities: West Hertfordshire, East Hertfordshire
- Option B: Three authorities: West Hertfordshire, Central Hertfordshire, East Hertfordshire
- Option C: Four authorities: West Hertfordshire, Southwest Hertfordshire, East Hertfordshire, Central Hertfordshire.

Proposals to government were submitted by the following councils on 28 November 2025:

Hertfordshire local government reorganisation proposals
Proposals	Proposed authorities	Composition of authority	Supported by	Proposal maps
2 unitary authorities	West Hertfordshire	Dacorum; Hertsmere; St Albans; Three Rivers; Watford	Hertfordshire County Council, St Albans City and District Council	
2 unitary authorities	Eastern Hertfordshire	Broxbourne; East Hertfordshire; North Hertfordshire; Stevenage; Welwyn Hatfield	Hertfordshire County Council, St Albans City and District Council	
3 unitary authorities	West Hertfordshire	Dacorum; Three Rivers; Watford; 4 wards from Hertsmere	East Hertfordshire District Council, Three Rivers District Council, Watford Borough Council	
3 unitary authorities	Central Hertfordshire	St Albans; Welwyn Hatfield; Hertsmere (less 4 wards)	East Hertfordshire District Council, Three Rivers District Council, Watford Borough Council	
3 unitary authorities	Eastern Hertfordshire	Broxbourne; East Hertfordshire; North Hertfordshire; Stevenage	East Hertfordshire District Council, Three Rivers District Council, Watford Borough Council	
4 unitary authorities	North West Hertfordshire	Dacorum; St Albans	Broxbourne Borough Council, Dacorum Borough Council, Hertsmere Borough Council, North Hertfordshire District Council, Stevenage Borough Council, Welwyn Hatfield Borough Council	
4 unitary authorities	South West Hertfordshire	Hertsmere; Three Rivers; Watford	Broxbourne Borough Council, Dacorum Borough Council, Hertsmere Borough Council, North Hertfordshire District Council, Stevenage Borough Council, Welwyn Hatfield Borough Council	
4 unitary authorities	Central Hertfordshire	Stevenage; North Hertfordshire (less 6 wards); Welwyn Hatfield (less 1 ward)	Broxbourne Borough Council, Dacorum Borough Council, Hertsmere Borough Council, North Hertfordshire District Council, Stevenage Borough Council, Welwyn Hatfield Borough Council	
4 unitary authorities	Eastern Hertfordshire	Broxbourne; East Hertfordshire; 6 wards from North Hertfordshire; 1 ward from Welwyn Hatfield	Broxbourne Borough Council, Dacorum Borough Council, Hertsmere Borough Council, North Hertfordshire District Council, Stevenage Borough Council, Welwyn Hatfield Borough Council	

Government consultation on these three proposals ran from 5 February 2026 to 26 March 2026.

==== Withdrawn initial decision ====
New district boundaries in Hertfordshire announced in July 2026

On 16 July 2026, the Secretary of State for Housing, Communities and Local Government announced his decision that the ceremonial county of Hertfordshire would be reorganised per the four unitary authorities proposal, with the exception of one ward from North Hertfordshire. Arbury ward would instead be in the new Central Hertfordshire authority.

1. West Hertfordshire, comprising the areas currently covered by Dacorum, and St Albans (2024 population 312,432).
2. South West Hertfordshire, comprising the areas currently covered by Hertsmere, Three Rivers, and Watford (2024 population 313,190).
3. Central Hertfordshire, comprising the areas currently covered by Stevenage, North Hertfordshire (less 5 wards), and Welwyn Hatfield (less 1 ward) (2024 population 322,394).
4. East Hertfordshire and Broxbourne, comprising the areas currently covered by Broxbourne, East Hertfordshire, 5 wards from North Hertfordshire, and 1 ward from Welwyn Hatfield (2024 population 288,175).

Hertfordshire County Council issued a judicial claim against the decision.

The July 2026 ministerial decision was paused and subjected to a review on 7 September 2026. The decision was withdrawn on 29 October 2026.

=== Kent and Medway ===
1998–present district boundaries in Kent

The Kent and Medway invitation area is coterminous with the ceremonial county of Kent. It is administered by Kent County Council, twelve non-metropolitan districts and one unitary authority:

1. Sevenoaks
2. Dartford
3. Gravesham
4. Tonbridge and Malling
5. Medway (unitary)
6. Maidstone
7. Tunbridge Wells
8. Swale
9. Ashford
10. Canterbury
11. Folkestone and Hythe
12. Thanet
13. Dover

Kent County Council and Medway Council applied for a devolution deal in January 2025 which would include a Mayor of Kent above several unitary authorities. In February 2025 it was announced that Kent would not be part of the priority programme.

==== Proposals ====
In July 2025, the county council suggested a split into three unitary authorities: West Kent, North Kent, and East Kent.

Medway Council suggested a four-authority plan including realignment of the existing Maidstone/Medway boundary.

Proposals to government were submitted by the following councils on 28 November 2025:

Kent local government reorganisation proposals
Proposals	Proposed authorities	Composition of authority	Supported by	Proposal maps
Option 1a 1 unitary authority	Kent	Ashford; Canterbury; Dartford; Dover; Folkestone and Hythe; Gravesham; Maidstone; Medway; Sevenoaks; Swale; Thanet; Tonbridge and Malling; Tunbridge Wells	Kent County Council	
Option 3a 3 unitary authorities	North Kent	Dartford; Gravesham; Medway; Swale	Folkestone and Hythe District Council, Maidstone Borough Council, Sevenoaks District Council, Tonbridge and Malling Borough Council, Tunbridge Wells Borough Council	
Option 3a 3 unitary authorities	West Kent	Maidstone; Sevenoaks; Tonbridge and Malling; Tunbridge Wells	Folkestone and Hythe District Council, Maidstone Borough Council, Sevenoaks District Council, Tonbridge and Malling Borough Council, Tunbridge Wells Borough Council	
Option 3a 3 unitary authorities	East Kent	Ashford; Canterbury; Dover; Folkestone and Hythe; Thanet	Folkestone and Hythe District Council, Maidstone Borough Council, Sevenoaks District Council, Tonbridge and Malling Borough Council, Tunbridge Wells Borough Council	
Option 4b 4 unitary authorities	North Kent	Dartford; Gravesham; Medway	Dover District Council, Swale Borough Council, Thanet District Council	
Option 4b 4 unitary authorities	West Kent	Maidstone; Sevenoaks; Tonbridge and Malling; Tunbridge Wells	Dover District Council, Swale Borough Council, Thanet District Council	
Option 4b 4 unitary authorities	Mid Kent	Swale; Ashford; Folkestone and Hythe	Dover District Council, Swale Borough Council, Thanet District Council	
Option 4b 4 unitary authorities	East Kent	Canterbury; Dover; Thanet	Dover District Council, Swale Borough Council, Thanet District Council	
Option 4d 4 unitary authorities	North Kent	Medway (98%); Gravesham (87%); Swale (81%); Dartford (78%); Tonbridge and Malling (3%); Maidstone (2%)	Medway Council, Ashford Borough Council, Canterbury City Council	
Option 4d 4 unitary authorities	West Kent	Sevenoaks; Tunbridge Wells; Tonbridge and Malling (61%); Dartford (22%); Gravesham (13%); Medway (2%)	Medway Council, Ashford Borough Council, Canterbury City Council	
Option 4d 4 unitary authorities	Mid Kent	Ashford; Maidstone (98%); Folkestone and Hythe (36%); Tonbridge and Malling (36%); Swale (3%); Medway (<1%)	Medway Council, Ashford Borough Council, Canterbury City Council	
Option 4d 4 unitary authorities	East Kent	Canterbury; Dover; Thanet; Folkestone and Hythe (64%); Swale (17%)	Medway Council, Ashford Borough Council, Canterbury City Council	
Option 5a 5 unitary authorities	North Kent	Dartford; Gravesham; 11 parishes and unparished area west of River Medway from Medway; 2 parishes from Sevenoaks	Dartford Borough Council, Gravesham Borough Council	
Option 5a 5 unitary authorities	Mid Kent	Swale (less 7 parishes); Medway (less 11 parishes and unparished area west of River Medway)	Dartford Borough Council, Gravesham Borough Council	
Option 5a 5 unitary authorities	East Kent	Canterbury; Thanet; 7 parishes from Swale	Dartford Borough Council, Gravesham Borough Council	
Option 5a 5 unitary authorities	West Kent	Maidstone; Tonbridge and Malling; Tunbridge Wells; Sevenoaks (less 2 parishes)	Dartford Borough Council, Gravesham Borough Council	
Option 5a 5 unitary authorities	South Kent	Ashford; Dover; Folkestone and Hythe	Dartford Borough Council, Gravesham Borough Council	

Government consultation on these five proposals ran from 5 February 2026 to 26 March 2026.

==== Withdrawn initial decision ====
New district boundaries in Kent announced in July 2026 (map data)
1. North Kent
2. West Kent
3. Mid Kent
4. East Kent

On 16 July 2026, the Secretary of State for Housing, Communities and Local Government announced his decision that the ceremonial county of Kent would be reorganised into four unitary authorities per Option 4b.

1. North Kent, comprising the areas currently covered by Dartford, Gravesham, and Medway (2024 population 528,337).
2. West Kent, comprising the areas currently covered by Maidstone, Sevenoaks, Tonbridge and Malling, and Tunbridge Wells (2024 population 567,062).
3. Mid Kent, comprising the areas currently covered by Ashford, Folkestone and Hythe, and Swale (2024 population 411,726).
4. East Kent, comprising the areas currently covered by Canterbury, Dover, and Thanet (2024 population 424,559).

Kent County Council took steps towards taking legal action against the decision.

The July 2026 ministerial decision was paused and subjected to a review on 7 September 2026. The decision was withdrawn on 29 October 2026.

=== Lancashire, Blackburn with Darwen, and Blackpool ===
1974–present district boundaries in Lancashire

The Lancashire, Blackburn with Darwen, and Blackpool invitation area is coterminous with the ceremonial county of Lancashire. It is administered by Lancashire County Council, twelve non-metropolitan districts and two unitary authorities:

1. Lancaster
2. Wyre
3. Blackpool (unitary)
4. Fylde
5. Preston
6. Ribble Valley
7. South Ribble
8. Hyndburn
9. Burnley
10. Pendle
11. West Lancashire
12. Chorley
13. Blackburn with Darwen (unitary)
14. Rossendale

==== Proposals ====
In November 2024, a group of Lancashire MPs called for the replacement of the current two-tier system with a smaller number of unitary authorities. Three and four authority models were proposed. In December 2024, the leaders of South Ribble Council and Chorley Council proposed forming a unitary authority together with West Lancashire Council. As of October 2025, five options were under consideration by the county's councils:

- Two councils, with a northern council and a southern council.
- Three councils, with a northern council, a western council, and an eastern council.
- Four councils, with a north-western council, a south-western council, a south-eastern council, and a north-eastern council.
- Four councils, with a different configuration.
- Five councils, with a mid-western council, a south-western council, a central council, a northern council, and an eastern council.

Proposals to government were submitted by the following councils on 28 November 2025:

Lancashire, Blackburn with Darwen, and Blackpool local government reorganisation proposals
Proposals	Proposed authorities	Composition of authority	Supported by	Proposal maps
2 unitary authorities	North Lancashire	Blackpool; Fylde; Lancaster; Preston; Ribble Valley; Wyre	Lancashire County Council	
2 unitary authorities	South Lancashire	Blackburn with Darwen; Burnley; Chorley; Hyndburn; Pendle; Rossendale; South Ribble; West Lancashire	Lancashire County Council	
3 unitary authorities	Central Lancashire	Chorley; Preston; South Ribble; West Lancashire	Blackburn with Darwen Borough Council, Fylde Borough Council, Hyndburn Borough Council, Rossendale Borough Council, Wyre Borough Council	
3 unitary authorities	Coastal Lancashire	Blackpool; Fylde; Lancaster; Wyre	Blackburn with Darwen Borough Council, Fylde Borough Council, Hyndburn Borough Council, Rossendale Borough Council, Wyre Borough Council	
3 unitary authorities	Pennine Lancashire	Blackburn with Darwen; Burnley; Hyndburn; Pendle; Ribble Valley; Rossendale	Blackburn with Darwen Borough Council, Fylde Borough Council, Hyndburn Borough Council, Rossendale Borough Council, Wyre Borough Council	
4 unitary authorities	Fylde Coast	Blackpool; Fylde; Wyre	Chorley Borough Council, Lancaster City Council, Preston City Council, Ribble Valley Borough Council, South Ribble Borough Council, West Lancashire Borough Council	
4 unitary authorities	North Lancashire	Lancaster; Preston; Ribble Valley	Chorley Borough Council, Lancaster City Council, Preston City Council, Ribble Valley Borough Council, South Ribble Borough Council, West Lancashire Borough Council	
4 unitary authorities	Pennine Lancashire	Blackburn with Darwen; Burnley; Hyndburn; Pendle; Rossendale	Chorley Borough Council, Lancaster City Council, Preston City Council, Ribble Valley Borough Council, South Ribble Borough Council, West Lancashire Borough Council	
4 unitary authorities	South Lancashire	Chorley; South Ribble; West Lancashire	Chorley Borough Council, Lancaster City Council, Preston City Council, Ribble Valley Borough Council, South Ribble Borough Council, West Lancashire Borough Council	
Blackpool proposal 4 unitary authorities	"Eastern"	Blackburn with Darwen; Burnley; Hyndburn; Pendle; Rossendale; Ribble Valley (less 10 wards)	Blackpool Council	
Blackpool proposal 4 unitary authorities	"Northern"	Lancaster; 10 wards from Ribble Valley; 8 wards from Wyre	Blackpool Council	
Blackpool proposal 4 unitary authorities	"Southern"	Chorley; South Ribble; West Lancashire	Blackpool Council	
Blackpool proposal 4 unitary authorities	"Western"	Blackpool; Fylde; Preston; Wyre (less 8 wards)	Blackpool Council	
5 unitary authorities	"East"	Burnley; Pendle; Rossendale	Burnley Borough Council, Pendle Borough Council	
5 unitary authorities	"Middle"	Blackburn with Darwen; Hyndburn; Ribble Valley	Burnley Borough Council, Pendle Borough Council	
5 unitary authorities	"North"	Lancaster; Wyre	Burnley Borough Council, Pendle Borough Council	
5 unitary authorities	"South"	Chorley; South Ribble; West Lancashire	Burnley Borough Council, Pendle Borough Council	
5 unitary authorities	"West"	Blackpool; Fylde; Preston	Burnley Borough Council, Pendle Borough Council	

Government consultation on these five proposals ran from 5 February 2026 to 26 March 2026.

==== Withdrawn initial decision ====
New district boundaries in Lancashire announced in July 2026 (map data)
1. Fylde Coast
2. North Lancashire
3. Pennine Lancashire
4. South Lancashire

On 16 July 2026, the Secretary of State for Housing, Communities and Local Government announced his decision that the ceremonial county of Lancashire would be reorganised into four unitary authorities as proposed by Chorley, Lancaster, Preston, Ribble Valley, South Ribble, and West Lancashire.

1. Fylde Coast, comprising the areas currently covered by Blackpool, Fylde, and Wyre (2024 population 348,381).
2. North Lancashire, comprising the areas currently covered by Lancaster, Preston, and Ribble Valley (2024 population 373,664).
3. Pennine Lancashire, comprising the areas currently covered by Blackburn with Darwen, Burnley, Hyndburn, Pendle, and Rossendale (2024 population 520,653).
4. South Lancashire, comprising the areas currently covered by Chorley, South Ribble, and West Lancashire (2024 population 358,947).

Lancashire County Council authorised legal action against the decision.

The July 2026 ministerial decision was paused and subjected to a review on 7 September 2026. The decision was withdrawn on 29 October 2026.

=== Leicestershire, Leicester, and Rutland ===
1974–present district boundaries in Leicestershire

The Leicestershire, Leicester, and Rutland invitation area is coterminous with the ceremonial counties of Leicestershire and Rutland.

Leicestershire is administered by Leicestershire County Council, seven non-metropolitan districts and one unitary authority:

1. North West Leicestershire
2. Charnwood
3. Melton
4. Harborough
5. Oadby and Wigston
6. Blaby
7. Hinckley and Bosworth
8. Leicester (unitary)

Rutland is administered by a single unitary authority, Rutland County Council District Council.

==== Proposals ====
Three rival plans emerged for Leicestershire, Leicester, and Rutland in 2025. Leicestershire County Council proposed a "doughnut" model with a large unitary authority covering the entire area currently served by Leicestershire County Council and Rutland County Council. The seven non-metropolitan Leicestershire districts and Rutland County Council jointly considered proposing two smaller unitary authorities; a "North Leicestershire and Rutland Council" and a "South Leicestershire Council". Neither of these two plans seeks to change the status or boundaries of the existing Leicester City Council unitary authority. A third proposal by Leicester City Council seeks to substantially expand the existing Leicester unitary authority boundary to include more of the built up areas surrounding Leicester (including Oadby, Wigston, Thurmaston, Syston, Birstall, Glen Parva, Glenfield).

Proposals to government were submitted by the following councils on 28 November 2025:

Leicestershire, Leicester, and Rutland local government reorganisation proposals
Proposals	Proposed authorities	Composition of authority	Supported by	Proposal maps
Leicester City Council proposal 2 unitary authorities	Leicester (expanded)	Leicester; Oadby and Wigston; 16 parishes from Blaby; 11 parishes and 1 part-parish from Charnwood; 7 parishes and 5 part-parishes from Harborough	Leicester City Council	
Leicester City Council proposal 2 unitary authorities	Leicestershire and Rutland	Hinckley and Bosworth; Melton; North West Leicestershire; Rutland; Blaby (less 16 parishes); Charnwood (less 11 parishes and 1 part-parish); Harborough (less 7 parishes and 5 part-parishes)	Leicester City Council	
Leicestershire County Council proposal 2 unitary authorities	Leicester (unchanged)		Leicestershire County Council	
Leicestershire County Council proposal 2 unitary authorities	Leicestershire and Rutland	Oadby and Wigston; Blaby; Charnwood; Harborough; Hinckley and Bosworth; Melton; North West Leicestershire; Rutland	Leicestershire County Council	
3 unitary authorities	Leicester (unchanged)		Blaby District Council, Charnwood Borough Council, Harborough District Council, Hinckley and Bosworth Borough Council, Melton Borough Council, North West Leicestershire District Council, Oadby and Wigston Borough Council, Rutland County Council	
3 unitary authorities	North Leicestershire and Rutland	Charnwood; North West Leicestershire; Melton; Rutland	Blaby District Council, Charnwood Borough Council, Harborough District Council, Hinckley and Bosworth Borough Council, Melton Borough Council, North West Leicestershire District Council, Oadby and Wigston Borough Council, Rutland County Council	
3 unitary authorities	South Leicestershire	Blaby; Harborough; Hinckley and Bosworth; Oadby and Wigston	Blaby District Council, Charnwood Borough Council, Harborough District Council, Hinckley and Bosworth Borough Council, Melton Borough Council, North West Leicestershire District Council, Oadby and Wigston Borough Council, Rutland County Council	

Government consultation on these three proposals ran from 5 February 2026 to 26 March 2026.

==== Withdrawn initial decision ====
On 16 July 2026, the Secretary of State for Housing, Communities and Local Government announced his decision that the ceremonial counties of Leicestershire and Rutland would be reorganised into two unitary authorities per the Leicester City Council proposal, with the exception of six part-parishes from Charnwood and Harborough. The parishes of Ashby Magna, Dunton Bassett, Gaulby, Houghton on the Hill, Kings Norton, and Rothley would instead remain undivided and be in the new Leicestershire and Rutland authority.

1. Leicester, comprising the areas currently covered by Leicester, Oadby and Wigston, 16 parishes from Blaby, 11 parishes from Charnwood, and 7 parishes from Harborough (2024 population 613,090).
2. Leicestershire and Rutland, comprising the areas currently covered by Hinckley and Bosworth, Melton, North West Leicestershire, Rutland, Blaby (less 16 parishes), Charnwood (less 11 parishes), and Harborough (less 7 parishes) (2024 population 562,274).

Five district councils jointly took legal action against the decision.

The July 2026 ministerial decision was paused and subjected to a review on 7 September 2026. The decision was withdrawn on 29 October 2026.

=== Lincolnshire, North East Lincolnshire, and North Lincolnshire ===
1996–present district boundaries in Lincolnshire

The Lincolnshire, North East Lincolnshire, and North Lincolnshire invitation area is coterminous with the ceremonial county of Lincolnshire. It is administered by Lincolnshire County Council, seven non-metropolitan districts and two unitary authorities:

1. Lincoln
2. North Kesteven
3. South Kesteven
4. South Holland
5. Boston
6. East Lindsey
7. West Lindsey
8. North Lincolnshire (unitary)
9. North East Lincolnshire (unitary)

==== Proposals ====
In March 2025, three separate proposals for the future governance of Lincolnshire were published:

1. A single council for the area that currently makes up Lincolnshire County Council and a merger of the current two unitary authorities of North East Lincolnshire and North Lincolnshire in the north of the county to make a single council however the proposed northern council would not be within the government's preferred minimum population quota of 500,000.
2. Lincolnshire split into two separate unitary authorities on a north–south basis with North East Lincolnshire, North Lincolnshire, East Lindsey, and West Lindsey making up the northern council area and Lincoln, North Kesteven, South Kesteven, Boston, and South Holland making up the southern council area. Both proposed areas fall within the governments preferred minimum population quota of 500,000.
3. Lincolnshire split up into three council areas, one covering Lincoln, West Lindsey, North Kesteven, and South Kesteven, the second covering East Lindsey, Boston, and South Holland, and the third covering North East Lincolnshire and North Lincolnshire. It is stated that this option is unlikely to proceed because none of the proposed areas would be within the minimum population quota.

Proposals to government were submitted by the following councils on 28 November 2025:

Lincolnshire, North East Lincolnshire, and North Lincolnshire local government reorganisation proposals
Proposals	Proposed authorities	Composition of authority	Supported by	Proposal maps
2 unitary authorities	Northern Lincolnshire	Lincoln; North East Lincolnshire; North Lincolnshire; West Lindsey	Boston Borough Council, East Lindsey District Council, South Holland District Council	
2 unitary authorities	Southern Lincolnshire	Boston; East Lindsey; North Kesteven; South Holland; South Kesteven	Boston Borough Council, East Lindsey District Council, South Holland District Council	
3 unitary authorities	Lincolnshire	Boston; East Lindsey; Lincoln; North Kesteven; South Holland; South Kesteven; West Lindsey	Lincolnshire County Council, North East Lincolnshire Council, North Lincolnshire Council	
3 unitary authorities	North East Lincolnshire (unchanged)		Lincolnshire County Council, North East Lincolnshire Council, North Lincolnshire Council	
3 unitary authorities	North Lincolnshire (unchanged)		Lincolnshire County Council, North East Lincolnshire Council, North Lincolnshire Council	
Lincoln proposal 4 unitary authorities	Lincoln (expanded)	Lincoln; 12 wards from North Kesteven; 7 wards from West Lindsey	City of Lincoln Council	
Lincoln proposal 4 unitary authorities	Rural Lincolnshire	Boston; East Lindsey; South Holland; South Kesteven; North Kesteven (less 12 wards); West Lindsey (less 7 wards)	City of Lincoln Council	
Lincoln proposal 4 unitary authorities	North East Lincolnshire (unchanged)		City of Lincoln Council	
Lincoln proposal 4 unitary authorities	North Lincolnshire (unchanged)		City of Lincoln Council	
North/South Kesteven proposal 4 unitary authorities	"Unitary 1"	North Kesteven; South Holland; South Kesteven	North Kesteven District Council, South Kesteven District Council	
North/South Kesteven proposal 4 unitary authorities	"Unitary 2"	Boston; East Lindsey; Lincoln; West Lindsey	North Kesteven District Council, South Kesteven District Council	
North/South Kesteven proposal 4 unitary authorities	North East Lincolnshire (unchanged)		North Kesteven District Council, South Kesteven District Council	
North/South Kesteven proposal 4 unitary authorities	North Lincolnshire (unchanged)		North Kesteven District Council, South Kesteven District Council	
West Lindsey District Council did not submit a proposal.

Government consultation on these four proposals ran from 5 February 2026 to 26 March 2026:

==== Withdrawn initial decision ====
New district boundaries in Lincolnshire announced in July 2026

On 16 July 2026, the Secretary of State for Housing, Communities and Local Government announced his decision that the ceremonial county of Lincolnshire would be reorganised into four unitary authorities per the City of Lincoln Council proposal.

1. Lincoln, comprising the areas currently covered by Lincoln, 12 wards from North Kesteven, and 7 wards from West Lindsey (2024 population 208,249).
2. Lincolnshire, comprising the areas currently covered by Boston, East Lindsey, South Holland, South Kesteven, North Kesteven (less 12 wards), and West Lindsey (less 7 wards) (2024 population 581,253).
3. North East Lincolnshire (unchanged) (2024 population 159,911).
4. North Lincolnshire (unchanged) (2024 population 171,336).

Lincolnshire County Council and South Kesteven District Council took legal action against the decision.

The July 2026 ministerial decision was paused and subjected to a review on 7 September 2026. The decision was withdrawn on 29 October 2026.

=== Nottinghamshire and Nottingham ===
1974–present district boundaries in Nottinghamshire

The Nottinghamshire and Nottingham invitation area is coterminous with the ceremonial county of Nottinghamshire. It is administered by Nottinghamshire County Council, seven non-metropolitan districts and one unitary authority:

1. Nottingham (unitary)
2. Bassetlaw
3. Mansfield
4. Newark and Sherwood
5. Ashfield
6. Gedling
7. Broxtowe
8. Rushcliffe

==== Proposals ====
In March 2025, the county's councils agreed to submit three options for further consideration known as Option 1b, Option 1e, and Option Bii. All three proposals would see the area covered by two authorities, with one council covering the Nottingham built-up area, and the other covering the remainder of the county:

As of October 2025, the councils covering the county had been unable to agree on which option to formally submit to the UK government.

Bassetlaw District Council, Gedling Borough Council, Mansfield District Council, and Newark and Sherwood District Council each indicated their support for Option 1e, arguing that it provided a more balanced division between urban and rural areas, as well as demonstrating "sensible geography" for the county, creating a clear north–south division that better reflected existing community and economic patterns. They also cited findings from local consultations, which suggested that Option 1e was the public's preferred option.

Rushcliffe Borough Council and Nottinghamshire County Council both expressed a preference for Option 1b. Supporters of this approach cited closer administrative and functional ties between those districts and the city, suggesting it would create a clearer distinction between the Nottingham urban area and the wider county.

Nottingham City Council expressed support for Option Bii, arguing that the current boundaries, drawn decades earlier, were "no longer fit for purpose" and did not reflect modern patterns of growth and connectivity. It stated: "we can't let outdated boundaries or political convenience dictate our future", contending that a new configuration should reflect the city's actual economic and social footprint.

Broxtowe Borough Council stated that it would oppose any reorganisation which resulted in the division of the borough between two unitary authorities, arguing that such a split would undermine local identity and the efficient delivery of services.

Proposals to government were submitted by the following councils on 28 November 2025:

Nottinghamshire and Nottingham local government reorganisation proposals
Proposals	Proposed authorities	Composition of authority	Supported by	Proposal maps
Option 1b 2 unitary authorities	Nottingham (expanded)	Broxtowe; Nottingham; Gedling	Rushcliffe Borough Council, Nottinghamshire County Council	
Option 1b 2 unitary authorities	Nottinghamshire	Ashfield; Bassetlaw; Mansfield; Newark and Sherwood; Rushcliffe	Rushcliffe Borough Council, Nottinghamshire County Council	
Option 1e 2 unitary authorities	Sherwood Forest	Ashfield; Bassetlaw; Gedling; Mansfield; Newark and Sherwood	Bassetlaw District Council, Gedling Borough Council, Mansfield District Council, Newark and Sherwood District Council	
Option 1e 2 unitary authorities	Nottingham and South Nottinghamshire	Broxtowe; Nottingham; Rushcliffe	Bassetlaw District Council, Gedling Borough Council, Mansfield District Council, Newark and Sherwood District Council	
Option Bii 2 unitary authorities	"Southwest"	Nottingham; Broxtowe (less 5 wards); Gedling (less 4 wards); Rushcliffe (less 7 wards)	Nottingham City Council	
Option Bii 2 unitary authorities	"North and East"	Ashfield; Bassetlaw; Mansfield; Newark and Sherwood; 5 wards from Broxtowe; 4 wards from Gedling; 7 wards from Rushcliffe	Nottingham City Council	
Note: Ashfield District Council and Broxtowe Borough Council did not submit proposals.

Government consultation on these three proposals ran from 5 February 2026 to 26 March 2026.

==== Withdrawn initial decision ====
New district boundaries in Nottinghamshire announced in July 2026

On 16 July 2026, the Secretary of State for Housing, Communities and Local Government announced his decision that the ceremonial county of Nottinghamshire would be reorganised into two unitary authorities per Option Bii. Elections to the two unitary authorities will take place in May 2027, with the new boundaries going into effect from April 2028.

1. Greater Nottingham, comprising the areas currently covered by Nottingham, Broxtowe (less 5 wards), Gedling (less 4 wards), and Rushcliffe (less 7 wards) (2024 population 618,503).
2. Nottinghamshire, comprising the areas currently covered by Ashfield, Bassetlaw, Mansfield, Newark and Sherwood, 5 wards from Broxtowe, 4 wards from Gedling, and 7 wards from Rushcliffe (2024 population 569,587).

Nottinghamshire County Council issued a judicial claim against the decision.

The July 2026 ministerial decision was paused and subjected to a review on 7 September 2026. The decision was withdrawn on 29 October 2026.

=== Oxfordshire ===
1974–present district boundaries in Oxfordshire

The Oxfordshire invitation area is coterminous with the ceremonial county of Oxfordshire. It is administered by Oxfordshire County Council and five non-metropolitan districts:

1. Oxford
2. Cherwell
3. South Oxfordshire
4. Vale of White Horse
5. West Oxfordshire

==== Proposals ====
Proposals to government were submitted by the following councils on 28 November 2025:

Oxfordshire local government reorganisation proposals
Proposals	Proposed authorities	Composition of authority	Supported by	Proposal maps
1 unitary authority	Oxfordshire	Cherwell; Oxford; South Oxfordshire; Vale of White Horse; West Oxfordshire	Oxfordshire County Council	
2 unitary authorities	Ridgeway	South Oxfordshire; Vale of White Horse; West Berkshire	Cherwell District Council, South Oxfordshire District Council, Vale of White Horse District Council, West Oxfordshire District Council, West Berkshire Council	
2 unitary authorities	Oxford and Shires	Cherwell; Oxford; West Oxfordshire	Cherwell District Council, South Oxfordshire District Council, Vale of White Horse District Council, West Oxfordshire District Council, West Berkshire Council	
3 unitary authorities	Greater Oxford	Oxford; 15 parishes from Cherwell; 25 parishes from South Oxfordshire; 9 parishes from Vale of White Horse	Oxford City Council	
3 unitary authorities	Northern Oxfordshire	West Oxfordshire; Cherwell (less 15 parishes)	Oxford City Council	
3 unitary authorities	Ridgeway	West Berkshire; South Oxfordshire (less 25 parishes); Vale of White Horse (less 9 parishes)	Oxford City Council	
Note: Two of these three proposals include the current unitary authority area of West Berkshire from the neighbouring ceremonial county of Berkshire. This is outside of the government's invitation area.

Government consultation on these three proposals ran from 5 February 2026 to 26 March 2026.

==== Withdrawn initial decision ====
On 16 July 2026, the Secretary of State for Housing, Communities and Local Government announced his decision that the ceremonial county of Oxfordshire and the unitary authority of West Berkshire (in the ceremonial county of Berkshire) would be reorganised per the three unitary authorities proposal.

1. Greater Oxford, comprising the areas currently covered by Oxford, 15 parishes from Cherwell, 25 parishes from South Oxfordshire, and 9 parishes from Vale of White Horse (2024 population 234,673).
2. North Oxfordshire, comprising the areas currently covered by West Oxfordshire and Cherwell (less 15 parishes) (2024 population 267,280).
3. Ridgeway, comprising the areas currently covered by West Berkshire, South Oxfordshire (less 25 parishes), and Vale of White Horse (less 9 parishes) (2024 population 426,377).

Oxfordshire County Council sent a legal letter as a precursor to a judicial review, asking for evidence that the decision criteria were met. In October 2026, the county council initiated a legal challenge.

The July 2026 ministerial decision was paused and subjected to a review on 7 September 2026.

==== Revised proposal ====
On 29 October 2026, the government withdrew the July decision. A modified proposal was announced with the 9 parishes of Nuneham Courtenay, Culham, Clifton Hampden, Marsh Baldon, Great Milton, Wheatley, Waterstock and Holton now proposed to form part of Ridgeway and not Greater Oxford. The government announced it was "minded" to go ahead with the modified reorganisation, subject to a three-week period of consultation. Oxfordshire County Council reacted to the revised proposal with a threat of further potential legal action. In November 2026, the government revised its modified proposal to include the 9 parishes in Greater Oxford and not Ridgeway.

=== Staffordshire and Stoke-on-Trent ===
1974–present district boundaries in Staffordshire

The Staffordshire and Stoke-on-Trent invitation area is coterminous with the ceremonial county of Staffordshire. It is administered by Staffordshire County Council, eight non-metropolitan districts and one unitary authority:

1. Stoke-on-Trent (unitary)
2. Newcastle-under-Lyme
3. Staffordshire Moorlands
4. Stafford
5. East Staffordshire
6. South Staffordshire
7. Cannock Chase
8. Lichfield
9. Tamworth

==== Proposals ====
In February 2025, Stoke-on-Trent City Council proposed merging with neighbouring Newcastle-under-Lyme and Staffordshire Moorlands. In March 2025, the district councils of Stafford, East Staffordshire, South Staffordshire, Cannock Chase, Lichfield, and Tamworth jointly proposed a complementary unitary authority covering the six districts. In October 2025 Staffordshire Moorlands proposed a modified version of this north/south split, in which the areas surrounding Uttoxeter (currently in East Staffordshire) and Stone (currently in Stafford) would also be added to the northern authority.

Later that October, the district councils of Lichfield, South Staffordshire, and Tamworth proposed an alternative three-unitary model with two unitaries in the south of the county.

Any north/south split is opposed by Newcastle-under-Lyme Borough Council, who instead prefer the current two-tier system, a Newcastle-under-Lyme unitary authority or any other unitary authority excluding Stoke-on-Trent.

Separately in February 2025, Staffordshire County Council put forward a rival proposal for a unitary authority to cover the area of the current county council. However, since this proposal, the county council changed hands, with Reform UK now controlling the council. The Reform-led council instead proposed an east/west split.

Proposals to government were submitted by the following councils on 28 November 2025:

Staffordshire and Stoke-on-Trent local government reorganisation proposals
Proposals	Proposed authorities	Composition of authority	Supported by	Proposal maps
North/South split proposal 2 unitary authorities	North Staffordshire	Newcastle‑under‑Lyme; Staffordshire Moorlands; Stoke‑on‑Trent	Cannock Chase District Council, East Staffordshire Borough Council, Stafford Borough Council, Stoke‑on‑Trent City Council	
North/South split proposal 2 unitary authorities	Southern and Mid Staffordshire	Cannock Chase; East Staffordshire; Lichfield; South Staffordshire; Stafford; Tamworth	Cannock Chase District Council, East Staffordshire Borough Council, Stafford Borough Council, Stoke‑on‑Trent City Council	
Staffordshire Moorlands proposal 2 unitary authorities	North Staffordshire	Newcastle-under-Lyme; Staffordshire Moorlands; Stoke-on-Trent; 16 parishes from East Staffordshire; 6 parishes from Stafford	Staffordshire Moorlands District Council	
Staffordshire Moorlands proposal 2 unitary authorities	Southern and Mid Staffordshire	Cannock Chase; Lichfield; South Staffordshire; Tamworth; East Staffordshire (less 16 parishes); Stafford (less 6 parishes)	Staffordshire Moorlands District Council	
East/West split proposal 2 unitary authorities	Staffordshire East	East Staffordshire; Lichfield; Staffordshire Moorlands; Stoke-on-Trent; Tamworth	Staffordshire County Council	
East/West split proposal 2 unitary authorities	Staffordshire West	Cannock Chase; Newcastle-under-Lyme; South Staffordshire; Stafford	Staffordshire County Council	
3 unitary authorities	North Staffordshire	Newcastle-under-Lyme; Staffordshire Moorlands; Stoke-on-Trent	Lichfield District Council, South Staffordshire District Council, Tamworth Borough Council	
3 unitary authorities	South-West Staffordshire	Cannock Chase; South Staffordshire; Stafford	Lichfield District Council, South Staffordshire District Council, Tamworth Borough Council	
3 unitary authorities	South-East Staffordshire	East Staffordshire; Lichfield; Tamworth	Lichfield District Council, South Staffordshire District Council, Tamworth Borough Council	
4 unitary authorities	"Unitary A"	Newcastle-under-Lyme	Newcastle-under-Lyme Borough Council	
4 unitary authorities	"Unitary B"	Cannock Chase; South Staffordshire; Stafford	Newcastle-under-Lyme Borough Council	
4 unitary authorities	"Unitary C"	Staffordshire Moorlands; Stoke-on-Trent	Newcastle-under-Lyme Borough Council	
4 unitary authorities	"Unitary D"	East Staffordshire; Lichfield; Tamworth	Newcastle-under-Lyme Borough Council	

Government consultation on these five proposals ran from 5 February 2026 to 26 March 2026.

Despite the differing proposals for local government reorganisation, all councils in the county have jointly proposed a mayoral strategic authority for Staffordshire and Stoke-on-Trent.

==== Withdrawn initial decision ====
New district boundaries in Staffordshire announced in July 2026

On 16 July 2026, the Secretary of State for Housing, Communities and Local Government announced his decision that the ceremonial county of Staffordshire would be reorganised into two unitary authorities per the north/south split proposed by Cannock Chase, East Staffordshire, Stafford, and Stoke-on-Trent.

1. North Staffordshire, comprising the areas currently covered by Newcastle-under-Lyme, Staffordshire Moorlands, and Stoke-on-Trent (2024 population 494,803).
2. South and Mid Staffordshire, comprising the areas currently covered by Cannock Chase, East Staffordshire, Lichfield, South Staffordshire, Stafford, and Tamworth (2024 population 682,775).

Newcastle-under-Lyme Borough Council initiated a legal challenge to the decision.

The July 2026 ministerial decision was paused and subjected to a review on 7 September 2026. The decision was withdrawn on 29 October 2026.

=== Warwickshire ===
1974–present district boundaries in Warwickshire

The Warwickshire invitation area is coterminous with the ceremonial county of Warwickshire. It is administered by Warwickshire County Council and five non-metropolitan districts:

1. North Warwickshire
2. Nuneaton and Bedworth
3. Rugby
4. Stratford-on-Avon
5. Warwick

==== Proposals ====
In October 2025, Warwickshire County Council voted to support a proposal for the entire county to become a single unitary authority, and for the county to apply to join the West Midlands Combined Authority. An alternative proposal by the county's Liberal Democrats would see Warwickshire divided into two unitary authorities on a north/south basis.

Proposals to government were submitted by the following councils on 28 November 2025:

Warwickshire local government reorganisation proposals
Proposals	Proposed authorities	Composition of authority	Supported by	Proposal maps
1 unitary authority	Warwickshire	North Warwickshire; Nuneaton and Bedworth; Rugby; Stratford-on-Avon; Warwick	Warwickshire County Council, Rugby Borough Council	
2 unitary authorities	North Warwickshire	North Warwickshire; Nuneaton and Bedworth; Rugby	North Warwickshire Borough Council, Nuneaton and Bedworth Borough Council, Stratford-on-Avon District Council, Warwick District Council	
2 unitary authorities	South Warwickshire	Stratford-on-Avon; Warwick	North Warwickshire Borough Council, Nuneaton and Bedworth Borough Council, Stratford-on-Avon District Council, Warwick District Council	

Government consultation on these two proposals ran from 5 February 2026 to 26 March 2026.

==== Initial decision under review ====
New district boundaries in Warwickshire announced in July 2026 (map data)
1. North Warwickshire
2. South Warwickshire

On 16 July 2026, the Secretary of State for Housing, Communities and Local Government announced his decision that the ceremonial county of Warwickshire would be reorganised per the two unitary authorities proposal.

1. North Warwickshire, comprising the areas currently covered by North Warwickshire, Nuneaton and Bedworth, and Rugby (2024 population 331,060).
2. South Warwickshire, comprising the areas currently covered by Stratford-on-Avon and Warwick (2024 population 301,147).

Warwickshire is one of three areas where no legal challenge to the decision has been threatened.

The July 2026 ministerial decision was paused and subjected to a review on 7 September 2026. On 29 October 2026, the government announced it was "minded" to go ahead with the reorganisation, subject to a three-week period of consultation.

=== Worcestershire ===
1998–present district boundaries in Worcestershire

The Worcestershire invitation area is coterminous with the ceremonial county of Worcestershire. It is administered by Worcestershire County Council and six non-metropolitan districts:

1. Worcester
2. Malvern Hills
3. Wyre Forest
4. Bromsgrove
5. Redditch
6. Wychavon

==== Proposals ====
Two options were considered for Worcestershire:

- One option would see all seven councils replaced with a single unitary authority.
- The alternative would see the county divided into two unitary authorities on a north/south basis.

Proposals to government were submitted by the following councils on 28 November 2025:

Worcestershire local government reorganisation proposals
Proposals	Proposed authorities	Composition of authority	Supported by	Proposal maps
1 unitary authority	Worcestershire	Bromsgrove; Malvern Hills; Redditch; Worcester; Wychavon; Wyre Forest	Worcestershire County Council, Wyre Forest District Council	
2 unitary authorities	North Worcestershire	Bromsgrove; Redditch; Wyre Forest	Bromsgrove District Council, Malvern Hills District Council, Redditch Borough Council, Worcester City Council, Wychavon District Council	
2 unitary authorities	South Worcestershire	Malvern Hills; Worcester; Wychavon	Bromsgrove District Council, Malvern Hills District Council, Redditch Borough Council, Worcester City Council, Wychavon District Council	

Government consultation on these two proposals ran from 5 February 2026 to 26 March 2026.

==== Initial decision under review ====
New district boundaries in Worcestershire announced in July 2026 (map data)
1. North Worcestershire
2. South Worcestershire

On 16 July 2026, the Secretary of State for Housing, Communities and Local Government announced his decision that the ceremonial county of Worcestershire would be reorganised per the two unitary authorities proposal.

1. North Worcestershire, comprising the areas currently covered by Bromsgrove, Redditch, and Wyre Forest (2024 population 293,445).
2. South Worcestershire, comprising the areas currently covered by Malvern Hills, Worcester, and Wychavon (2024 population 327,915).

Worcestershire is one of three areas where no legal challenge to the decision has been threatened.

The July 2026 ministerial decision was paused and subjected to a review on 7 September 2026. On 29 October 2026, the government announced it was "minded" to go ahead with the reorganisation, subject to a three-week period of consultation.

== Other proposals ==
The government allowed proposals to be made which affect existing neighbouring local authorities outside of the government's 19 invitation areas.

=== Berkshire ===
1974–present district boundaries in Berkshire

The ceremonial county of Berkshire is administered by six unitary authorities:

1. West Berkshire
2. Reading
3. Wokingham
4. Bracknell Forest
5. Windsor and Maidenhead
6. Slough

==== Proposals ====
West Berkshire Council has proposed to merge with the districts of Vale of White Horse and South Oxfordshire from the neighbouring ceremonial county of Oxfordshire to form a new unitary authority, preliminarily called 'Ridgeway Council'. The remainder of the ceremonial county of Berkshire would be unaffected.

Separately, the leader of Reading Borough Council and the MP for Reading West and Mid Berkshire has written to the Government to argue that residents of Reading's urban area who live within West Berkshire's boundaries, in suburbs such as Tilehurst, would be better served by becoming part of Reading Council rather than a council with Oxfordshire districts. The Councillor for Chieveley and Cold Ash disagreed, saying West Berkshire residents would be 'dominated' by Reading and Wokingham if it became part of a council with them. The leader of Reading Borough Council did not propose or mention the inclusion of West Berkshire outside of Reading suburbs nor the Borough of Wokingham. West Berkshire Council was the only Berkshire council to put forward proposals for reorganisation to government.

Government consultation on three proposals for the reorganisation of local government in Oxfordshire ran from 5 February 2026 to 26 March 2026. Two of these proposals include West Berkshire. None of the proposals would affect the remainder of Berkshire.

Oxfordshire local government reorganisation proposals which impact Berkshire ceremonial county
Proposals	Proposed authorities	Composition of authority	Proposal maps
From Oxfordshire Two Unitary proposal 6 unitary authorities	Ridgeway	West Berkshire; South Oxfordshire; Vale of White Horse	
From Oxfordshire Two Unitary proposal 6 unitary authorities	Reading (unchanged)		
From Oxfordshire Two Unitary proposal 6 unitary authorities	Wokingham (unchanged)		
From Oxfordshire Two Unitary proposal 6 unitary authorities	Bracknell Forest (unchanged)		
From Oxfordshire Two Unitary proposal 6 unitary authorities	Windsor and Maidenhead (unchanged)		
From Oxfordshire Two Unitary proposal 6 unitary authorities	Slough (unchanged)		
From Oxfordshire Three Unitary proposal 6 unitary authorities	Ridgeway	West Berkshire; South Oxfordshire (less 25 parishes); Vale of White Horse (less 9 parishes)	
From Oxfordshire Three Unitary proposal 6 unitary authorities	Reading (unchanged)		
From Oxfordshire Three Unitary proposal 6 unitary authorities	Wokingham (unchanged)		
From Oxfordshire Three Unitary proposal 6 unitary authorities	Bracknell Forest (unchanged)		
From Oxfordshire Three Unitary proposal 6 unitary authorities	Windsor and Maidenhead (unchanged)		
From Oxfordshire Three Unitary proposal 6 unitary authorities	Slough (unchanged)		

==== Initial decision under review ====
On 16 July 2026, the Secretary of State for Housing, Communities and Local Government announced his decision that West Berkshire would be reorganised into a new 'Ridgeway' authority per the Oxfordshire three unitary proposal. This decision confirms that the remaining five Berkshire unitary authorities will remain unchanged.

The July 2026 ministerial decision for the Oxfordshire and West Berkshire area was paused and subjected to a review on 7 September 2026. On 29 October 2026, the government announced it was "minded" to go ahead with the reorganisation, subject to a three-week period of consultation.

== See also ==
- History of local government in England
- Local government in England
- Earlier local government reforms:
  - 1974 structural changes to local government in England
  - 1995–1998 structural changes to local government in England
  - 2009 structural changes to local government in England
  - 2019–2023 structural changes to local government in England
