= Ridgeway (district) =

- Future unitary authority area
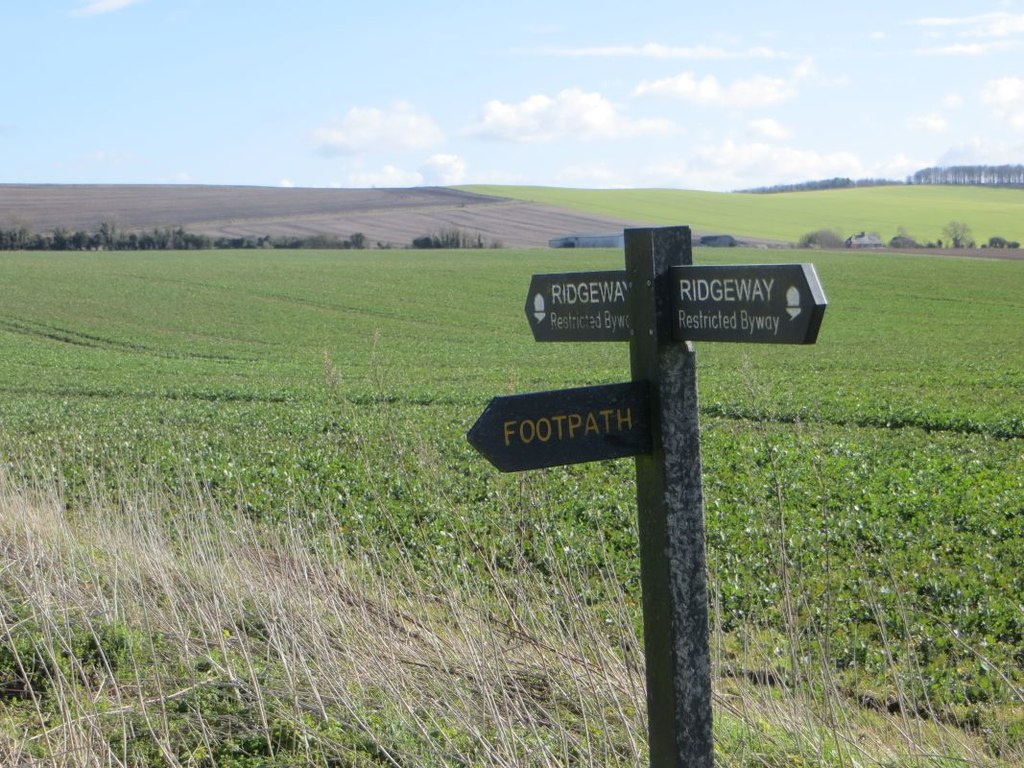
- The Ridgeway National Trail, after which the district is named

- Ridgeway within Berkshire and Oxfordshire
- Ridgeway boundaries as proposed in July 2026
- Coordinates: 51.40°N 1.32°W
- Sovereign state: United Kingdom
- Country: England
- Region: South East
- Ceremonial county: Berkshire, Oxfordshire

Government
  - Type: Unitary authority
  - Body: Ridgeway Council

Population (2024 estimate)
  - Total: 429,000
- Time zone: UTC+0 (GMT)
  - Summer (DST): UTC+1 (BST)

Ridgeway is a proposed unitary authority area in Berkshire and Oxfordshire, England, expected to be created as part of upcoming structural changes to local government in England. The largest settlement in its area is Newbury. The first elections are expected to take place in 2028, leading to the establishment of Ridgeway Council in 2029. The population was estimated to be 429,000 in 2024.

== Formation ==
It was announced in July 2026 that Ridgeway district would be formed from West Berkshire, which is currently a unitary authority area, and South Oxfordshire less 25 parishes and the Vale of White Horse less 9 parishes, which are currently two-tier districts in Oxfordshire.

The district is being formed as part of ongoing local government changes throughout England, in which all areas of the country having separate county councils and district councils would see them replaced with single-tier, or unitary, local governance. Alternative proposals for a single unitary area for Oxfordshire (leaving West Berkshire unchanged), or creating two unitaries in Oxfordshire and West Berkshire, were not accepted.

Decisions were announced in July 2026, with elections planned for May 2027 and the new authorities established in 2028. However, on 7 September 2026, the government announced that a number of ongoing local government reorganisations, including the one creating Ridgeway, would be paused until the decision was reviewed. Planned elections to the shadow authority in 2027 were cancelled, with existing district council elections to take place instead.

In October 2026, the plans were revived and modified. Eight South Oxfordshire parishes that were previously announced to go to Greater Oxford would now go to Ridgeway. (Note: The parishes of Nuneham Courtenay, Culham, Clifton Hampden, Marsh Baldon, Great Milton, Wheatley, Waterstock and Holton were proposed to form part of Ridgeway and not Greater Oxford.) The first election is expected to take place in 2028 and the unitary authority will be established in 2029, subject to a three week consultation period. Also in October, Oxfordshire County Council initiated legal action against the decision. Oxfordshire County Council reacted to the revised proposal with a threat of further potential legal action. In November 2026, the government revised its modified proposal to restore nine parishes to Greater Oxford.

== Governance ==
The new district is planned to be run by Ridgeway Council, which it was proposed in July 2026 to have 88 councillors.

== Geography ==
Ridgeway covers the predominantly rural areas to the north and west of Reading and to the south of Oxford. The Berkshire Downs lie within the district. The ancient track known as the Ridgeway runs through its centre, after which the district is named.

The largest settlement will be Newbury. Its other major towns will include Abingdon-on-Thames (the historic county town of Berkshire), Didcot, Faringdon, Henley-on-Thames, Hungerford, Thatcham, Thame, Wallingford and Wantage. It will extend into the western part of the Reading built-up area. The whole area is parished.

The population of the area, as proposed in July 2026, was estimated to be 429,000 in 2024.

== Ceremonial county ==
It is not currently clear which ceremonial county the new local authority area will form part of, or whether it will be divided between Berkshire and Oxfordshire. There is a precedent for a unitary authority to be divided between two ceremonial counties, in that the Borough of Stockton-on-Tees is split between those of County Durham and North Yorkshire.
