= Mid Kent =

UK parliamentary constituency in Kent (1983-1997)

- Proposed unitary authority area
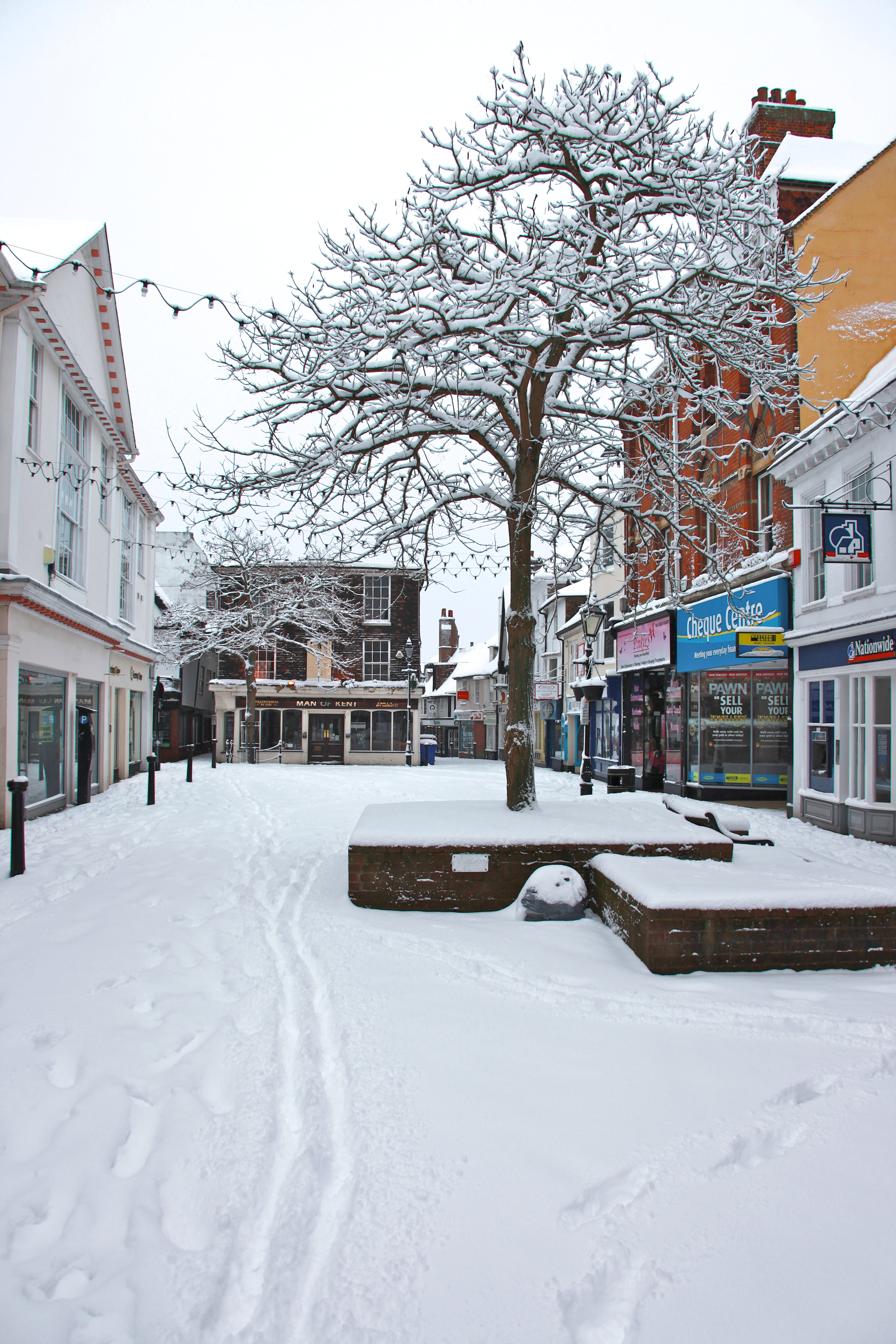
- Ashford

- Interactive map
- Coordinates: 51.1465°N 0.8676°E
- Sovereign state: United Kingdom
- Country: England

Government
  - Type: Unitary authority
  - Body: Mid Kent Council

Area
  - Total: 506 sq mi (1,311 km^{2})

Population (2024 estimate)
  - Total: 411,726
- Time zone: UTC+0 (GMT)
  - Summer (DST): UTC+1 (BST)

Mid Kent was a proposed unitary authority area that was scheduled to be created in Kent, England, as part of ongoing local government reform. The largest settlement would have been Ashford.

It would have been formed from three two-tier districts: Ashford, Folkestone and Hythe, and Swale. It would have bordered the three other proposed Kent unitary districts: North Kent, West Kent and East Kent.

The area has a 2024 estimated population of 411,726.

Plans to create it were halted in September 2026 and the first election was cancelled. In October 2026, the plans to create it were withdrawn.

== History ==
Mid Kent was first formed by proposals brought by Kent district councils as part of structural changes to local government in England which began in 2024. Prior to the local government reform, most of Kent had a two-tier system where Kent County Council and would provide local services. Following the 2024 Devolution White Paper, the ruling Labour Party announced that the government would seek to establish unitary authorities in the remaining two-tier areas including Kent.

In February 2025, the government wrote to the local authorities in Kent asking them to submit proposals for two-tier areas under the Local Government and Public Involvement in Health Act 2007. Mid Kent was included in Options 4b, 4d and 5a. Option 4b was supported by Swale District Council, and Option 4d, which had modified boundaries, was supported by Ashford Borough Council. Folkestone and Hythe District Council supported an option which would have seen it and Ashford become part of East Kent. Kent County Council supported a single-unitary option. Option 4b was selected by the government in July 2026.

In September 2026, the Kent proposals were halted by the government and placed under review. In October 2026, plans to create it were withdrawn. The decision was threatened with judicial review by Kent County Council.

== Governance ==
It would have been run by Mid Kent Council, which would have comprised 60 councillors. The first councillors were planned to be elected in May 2027, and the new authority was planned to assume full powers in April 2028. The 2027 election was cancelled in September 2026.

== Parishes ==
Ashford, Sittingbourne and Milton and the Halfway Houses area are currently unparished, the rest of the area is parished. In August 2026 the council approved proposals for the creation of a parish council for Halfway, and four parish councils in the Sittingbourne area, for Murston, Kemsley, Milton Regis and Grove Park.
