= South West Essex =

- Proposed unitary authority area
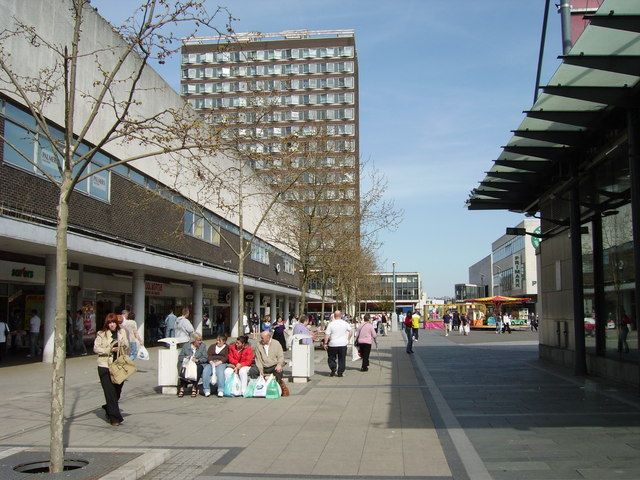
- Basildon

- South West Essex shown within Essex
- Interactive map of South West Essex
- Coordinates: 51.551°N 0.460°E
- Sovereign state: United Kingdom
- Country: England
- Region: East
- Ceremonial county: Essex

Government
  - Type: Unitary authority
  - Body: South West Essex Council

Area
  - Total: 105.6 sq mi (273.4 km^{2})

Population (2024 estimate)
  - Total: 374,621
  - Density: 3,549/sq mi (1,370/km^{2})
- Time zone: UTC+0 (GMT)
  - Summer (DST): UTC+1 (BST)

South West Essex was a proposed unitary authority area that was scheduled to be created in April 2028 in Essex, England. As part of an ongoing local government reorganisation, it would have been formed from the existing districts of Basildon and Thurrock. The first councillors to South West Essex Council would have been elected in May 2027. The largest settlement in the district would have been Basildon. Plans to create it were withdrawn in September 2026.

== History ==
The idea of merging Basildon and Thurrock was considered in 2021. In February 2025, Essex was accepted into the Devolution Priority Programme. Tied to this, councils were invited to submit proposals for the reorganisation of local government districts by September 2025. The government held statutory consultations from November 2025 to January 2026 and made a decision in March 2026. In South West Essex, it was decided to create a new unitary authority district by combining Basildon and Thurrock.

In September 2026, the Essex proposals were withdrawn by the government in light of new government advice. In September 2026, the Essex proposals were withdrawn by the government in light of new legal advice. The decision was threatened with judicial review by Essex County Council.

== Geography ==
The largest settlement in the district would have been the new town of Basildon. The Office for National Statistics mid-2023 population estimate of the district was 368,745.

=== Parishes ===
Most of the proposed district, including Basildon and the whole of the Thurrock area, is unparished. The rest of the area is made of civil parishes:

- Billericay, Bowers Gifford and North Benfleet
- Great Burstead and South Green
- Little Burstead
- Noak Bridge
- Ramsden Bellhouse, Ramsden Crays
- Shotgate
- Wickford

== Governance ==
The local authority would have been South West Essex Council. The first councillors would have been elected in May 2027. This election was cancelled in September 2026.
