= Bayford Brook =

River in Hertfordshire, England

Coordinates: 51°46′40″N 0°05′25″W

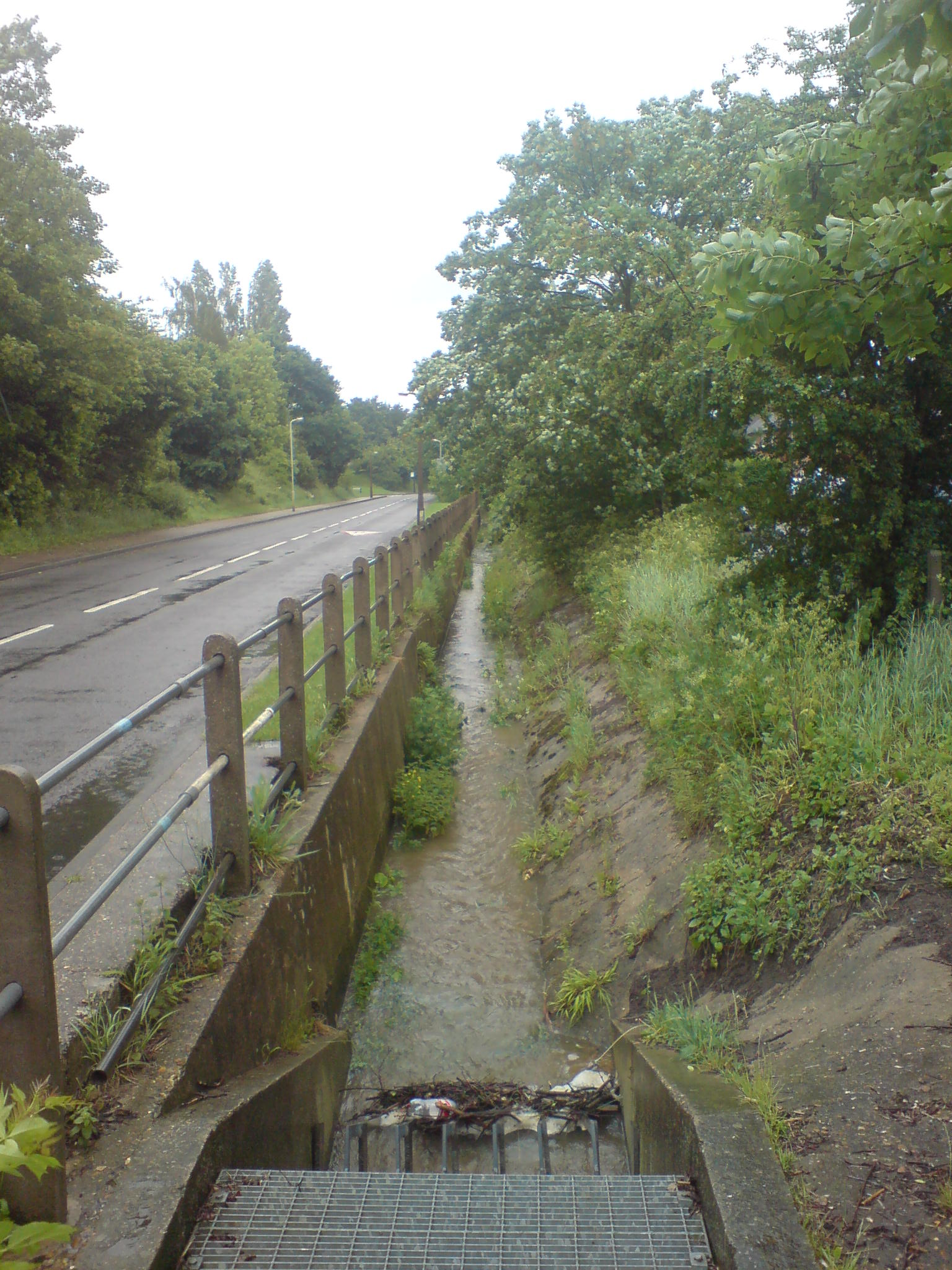
Bayford Brook at Horns Mill

Bayford Brook is a minor tributary of the River Lea. It forms in the hills near Bayford, Hertfordshire and joins the River Lea at Horns Mill Weir.

The brook is mostly dry during periods of little rain, as it has a steady gradient with few pools to collect water.

The brook is most easily viewed towards its northernmost point where is runs between the two parallel Brickendon Lanes before disappearing into a culvert (illustrated in the photograph). It can also be clearly seen to the left of Brickendon Lane heading away from Hertford at coordinates 51.781884,-0.081008

== Course ==
Course of the Bayford Brook
