= Lawrence Wright (disambiguation) =

Lawrence Wright is an author.

Lawrence Wright may also refer to:

- Lawrence Wright (American football) (born 1973), former American football player in the National Football League
- Lawrence Wright (composer) (1888–1964), British popular music composer and publisher
- Lawrence Wright (cricketer) (born 1940), English cricketer
- Lawrence Wright (Royal Navy officer) (died 1713), naval commodore
- Lawrence A. Wright (1927–2000), judge of the United States Tax Court

== See also ==
- Larry Wright (disambiguation)
