= Horns Mill, Hertford =

Suburb of Hertford, England

Coordinates: 51.786°N 0.084°W

Horns Mill is an area and suburb of south Hertford, Hertfordshire.

== History ==
Horn's Mill was at the foot of Bullock's Lane. The mill ground corn, crushed oil seeds and ground bones for fertiliser. Production ceased in the late nineteenth century and the premises were sold to leather-dresser William Webb. Chamois leather was produced at first but later a glove making business was established. This closed in 1971. The site is now occupied by housing in Waterdale, Tanners Close and Glovers Close.

The original mill was a watermill which was located on a cut from the upper section of the River Lea. The mill has long since been demolished, leaving only a set of sluice gates.

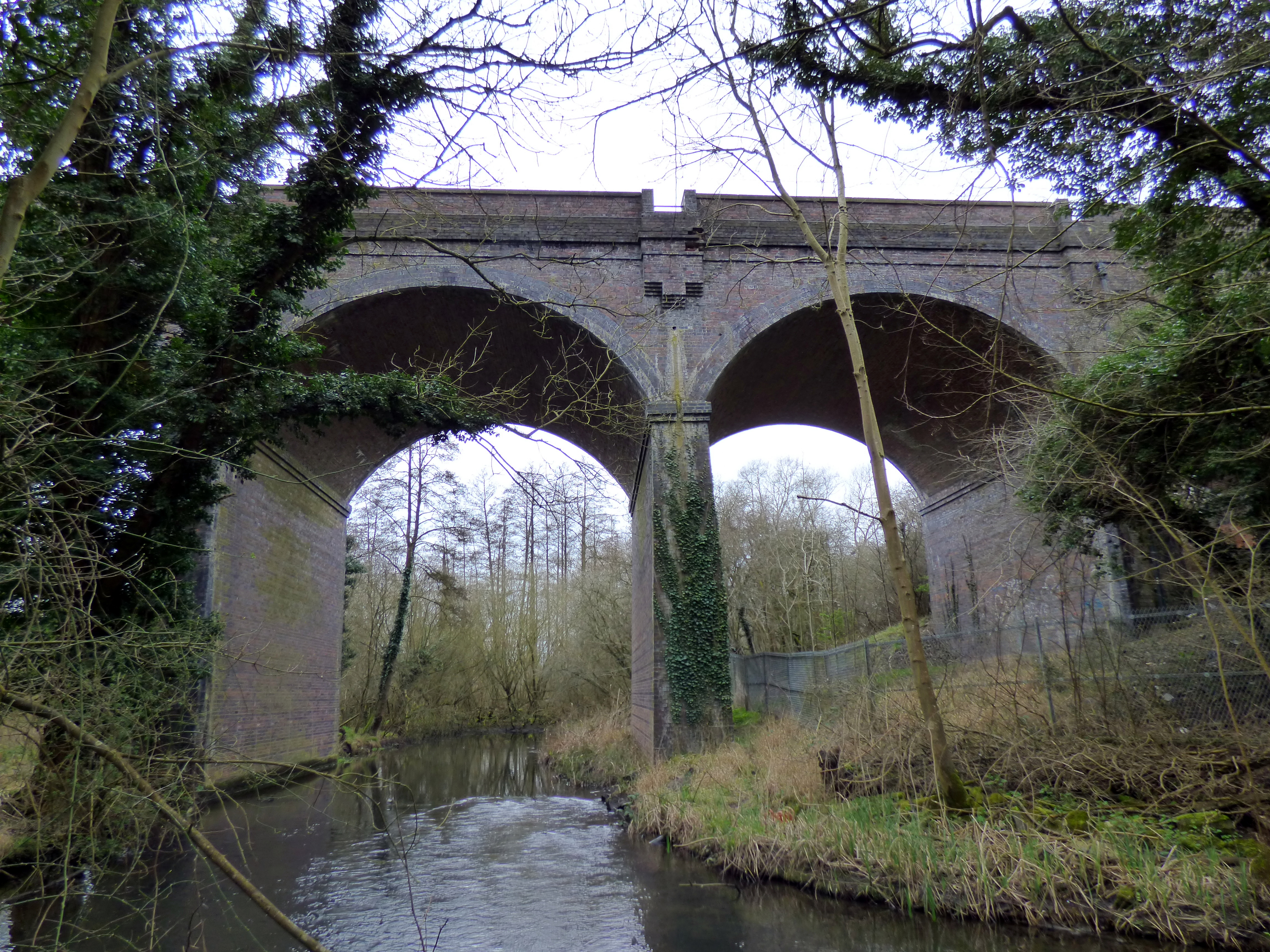
Horns Mill Viaduct

== Present ==
The area is now populated by four main housing estates generally known as Pearson Avenue or 'the old estate', Hornsmill or 'the new estate', Tanners Crescent and Mandeville Road. There are two grocery shops - one houses a post office, a modern community centre, a children's park with some facilities for younger and older children and the Grade II listed Harts Horns pub which as of March 2015 has ceased trading as a public house and is now a contemporary Indian restaurant called Ginger Bar & Restaurant. The Hornsmill Estate consists of Cecil Road, Brickendon Lane, Purkiss Road, Cranbourne Close, The Dell and Hornsmill Road. It is served by the H3 bus. The Hertford Loop Line flanks the area to the west where the Hertford Viaduct carries trains over the River Lea.

Children from the area generally attend Morgans Primary School & Nursery, accessible from Mandeville Road, before going to the nearby secondary schools; Simon Balle School, Richard Hale School, The Sele School or Presdales School which is served by a morning and afternoon bus.

Bayford brook joins the River Lea, by Horns Mill Weir.

== Sources ==
- https://web.archive.org/web/20020830224327/http://www.hertford.net/timeline.htm#TownMills
