= Larry Wright =

Larry Wright may refer to:

- Larry Wright (cartoonist) (1940–2017), cartoonist known for his editorial cartoons
- Larry Wright (ice hockey) (born 1951), retired professional ice hockey player
- Larry Wright (basketball) (born 1954), head coach of the Grambling Tigers men's basketball team
- Larry Wright (priest), British Anglican priest
- Larry Wright (street drummer) (born 1975), New York busker
- Larry Bud Wright (born 1940), American high school football coach
- L. W. Wright (1949–2024), American confidence trickster

== See also ==
- Lawrence Wright (disambiguation)
