= John Hughes (cricketer, born 1825) =

English cricketer

Personal information
- Full name: John Hughes
- Born: 2 July 1825; Hertford, Hertfordshire, England
- Died: 29 January 1907 (aged 81); Hertford, Hertfordshire, England
- Batting: Right-handed
- Bowling: Right-arm roundarm slow

Career statistics
Competition	First-class
Matches	1
Runs scored	8
Batting average	4.00
100s/50s	–/–
Top score	8
Balls bowled	189
Wickets	9
Bowling average	10.44
5 wickets in innings	1
10 wickets in match	–
Best bowling	7/46
Catches/stumpings	1/–
- Source: Cricinfo, 23 August 2019

John Hughes (2 July 1825 – 29 January 1907) was an English first-class cricketer.

Hughes was born at Hertford in July 1825. He played the majority of his cricket for Hertfordshire, who did not participate in major matches. Hughes' only appearance in first-class cricket came for the South against the Marylebone Cricket Club (MCC) at Lord's in 1874. An excellent right-arm roundarm slow bowler, he took figures of 2 for 48 in the MCC first-innings, before following that up with figures of 7 for 46 in their second-innings. With the bat, he was dismissed without scoring in the South's first-innings by Fred Morley, while in their second-innings he was dismissed for 8 runs by Alfred Shaw. Wisden considered him unfortunate not to play for a leading county of the time, given his skill as a bowler. Besides playing, he also stood as an umpire in two first-class matches in 1875 and 1892. Hughes died at Hertford in January 1907.
