= Shire Hall, Hertford =

County building in Hertford, Hertfordshire, England

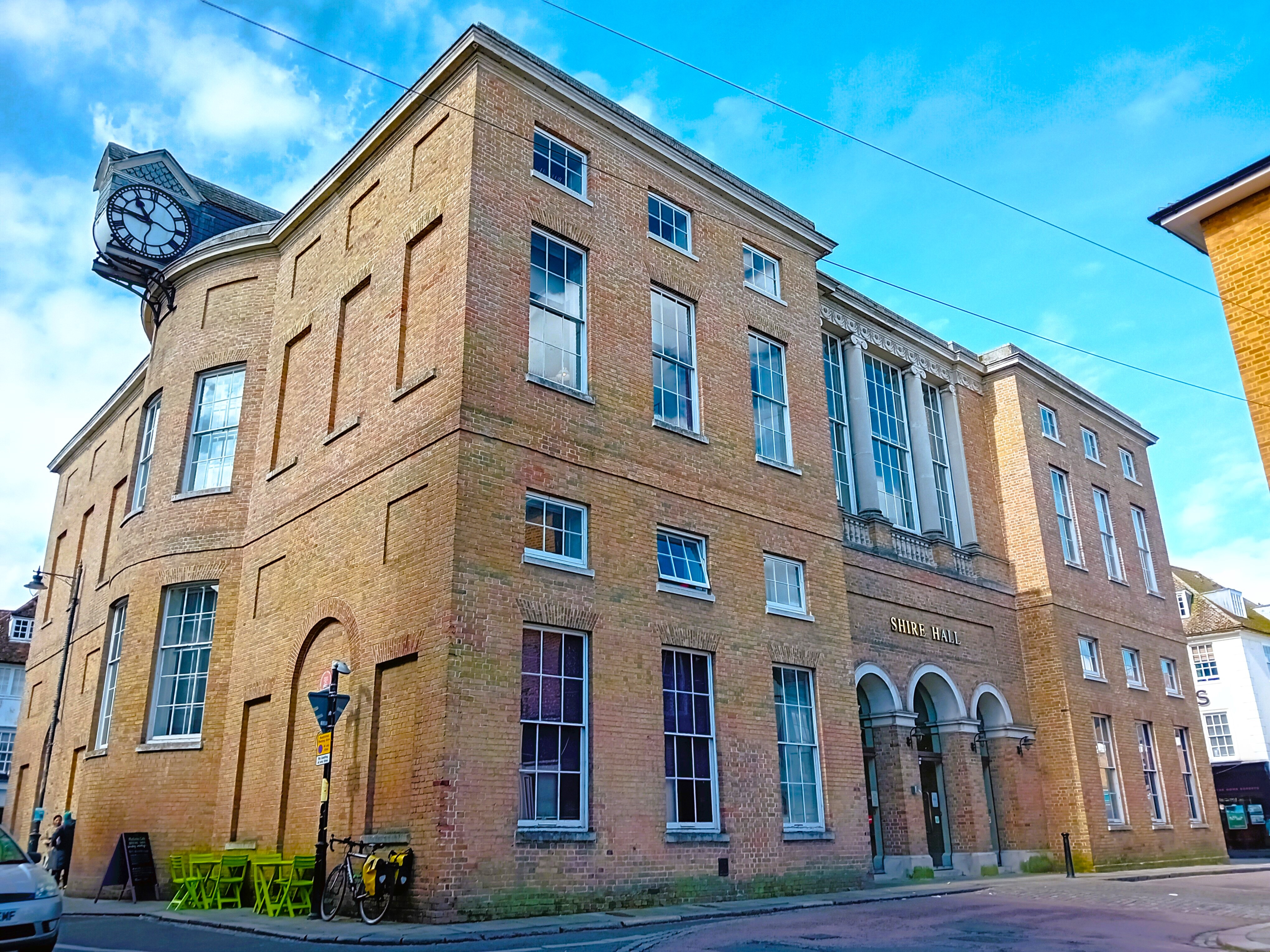

- Location within Hertfordshire
- 51.7963°N 0.0775°W
- Location: Hertford, Hertfordshire

History
- Built: 1771

Site notes
- Architect: James Adam
- Architectural style: Georgian style

Listed Building – Grade I
- Designated: 10 February 1950
- Reference no.: 1268930

The Shire Hall is a municipal building in Fore Street, Hertford, the county town of Hertfordshire, England. The building, which currently serves as a Magistrates' Court, is a Grade I listed building.

== History ==
The building was commissioned to replace an earlier Sessions House which had been built in 1560 and demolished in 1768. Although a team of Robert Adam and his younger brother James Adam were selected to design the building, James took charge of the commission and the Georgian style design is credited to him. The building was completed in 1771. The design involved a symmetrical main frontage with nine bays facing onto the Market Place with the end three bays on both sides slightly projected forwards; the central section of three bays featured a triple arched doorway on the ground floor and a triple sash window divided by two Ionic order columns on the first floor. A projecting clock, designed, manufactured and installed by John Briant of Hertford, was erected on the south elevation of the building in 1824, together with a set of bells (which were also manufactured by Briant).

The Shire Hall was originally used to accommodate the assembly rooms and courts for the county, but it also housed the town's corn exchange on the ground floor until the exchange moved into a new building in the mid-nineteenth century. At that point the courts were relocated from the first floor to the ground floor. Pevsner describes the building as "completely unadorned unless the two curved projections on the north and south are accepted as ornamental".

Following the implementation of the Local Government Act 1888, which established county councils in every county, it also became the meeting place of Hertfordshire County Council. A substantial council chamber, sometimes referred to as the "Round Room" or the "Rotunda", was established on the first floor. The Prince and Princess of Wales visited the Shire Hall on 23 July 1906.

The county council moved to County Hall, a larger and more modern complex located further from the town centre, in summer 1939. The Shire Hall continued to function as a courthouse, although the Crown Court moved to St Albans in 1971, leaving the Shire Hall solely as a Magistrates' Court. The building was completely restored between 1988 and 1990 for which it was awarded a commendation by the Civic Trust in 1992.
