= County Hall, Hertford =

County building in Hertford, Hertfordshire, England

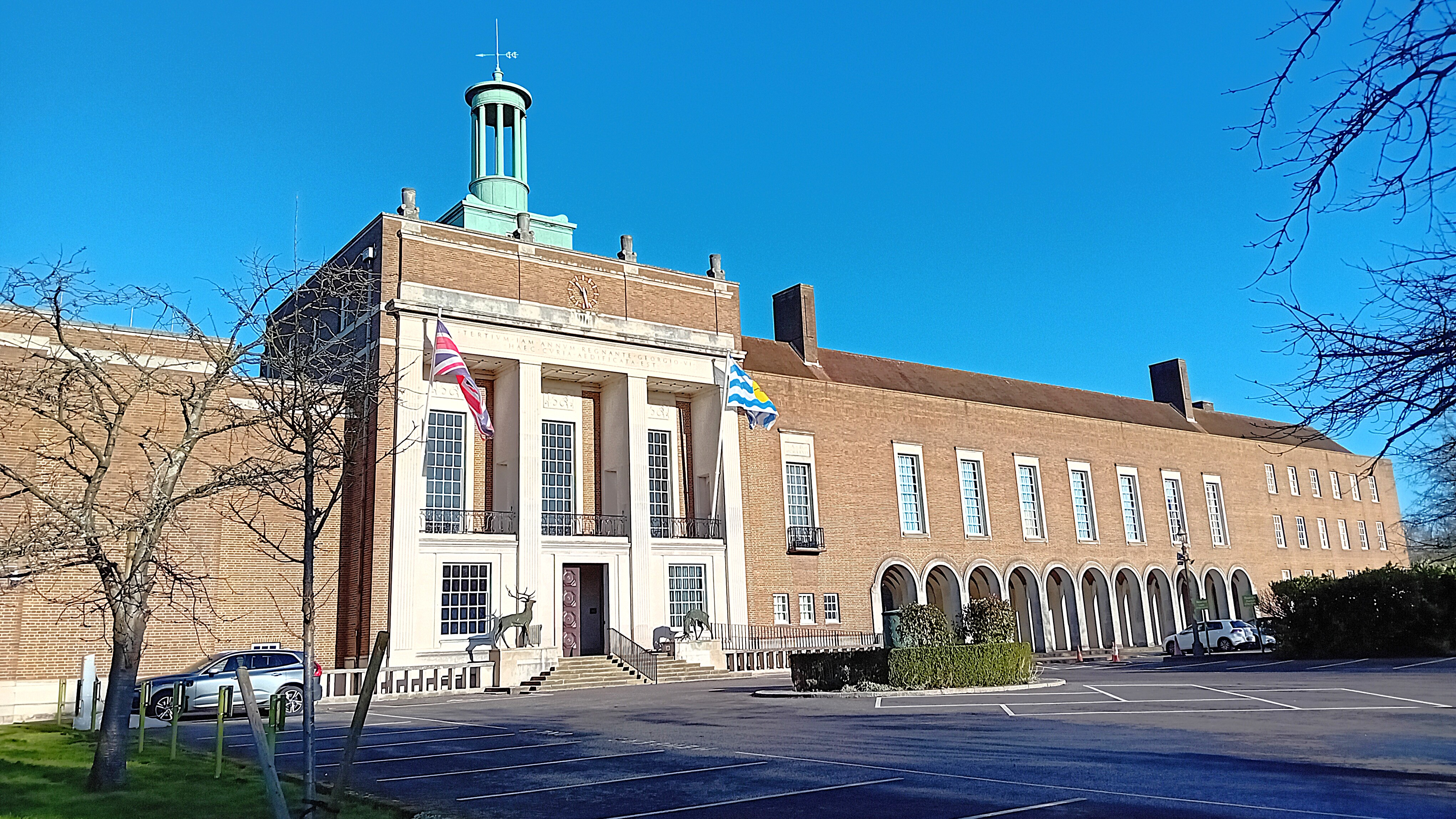

- Location within Hertfordshire
- 51.7908°N 0.0813°W
- Location: Hertford, Hertfordshire

History
- Built: 1939

Site notes
- Architect(s): Charles Holloway James and Stephen Rowland Pierce
- Architectural style: Neo-Georgian style with Scandinavian elements

Listed Building – Grade II*
- Designated: 9 September 1996
- Reference no.: 1268807

The County Hall is a municipal building complex in Pegs Lane, Hertford, Hertfordshire. The building, which was the headquarters of Hertfordshire County Council, is a Grade II* listed building.

== History ==
The original Shire Hall for Hertfordshire was located in Fore Street in Hertford. After deciding that Shire Hall was too restricted for future expansion, county leaders chose to procure a new county headquarters: the site they selected was open land located just off Pegs Lane.

Construction of the new building began in spring 1937. It was designed by Charles Holloway James and Stephen Rowland Pierce in the Neo-Georgian style with Scandinavian elements, built by C. Miskin & Son of St Albans and opened without ceremony in summer 1939. The first full council meeting in the building was held on 6 November 1939, when Queen Elizabeth sent a message of regret that the outbreak of the Second World War had prevented her fulfilling an earlier promise to formally open the building.

The design for the building involved an asymmetrical main frontage facing the Bullocks Lane; the left section of three bays featured a portico with four full height piers supporting a frieze with the words "Tertium iam annum regnante Georgio VI haec curia aedificata est" ("This building was constructed during the third year of the reign of George VI"); the portico contained a doorway flanked by square windows on the ground floor and it contained tall sash windows in a recess on the first floor; there was a copper-clad cupola at roof level; the right section contained a loggia of eleven bays on the ground floor and seven sash windows on the first floor. The principal room was the council chamber which was contained in a curved structure which jutted out of the main building to the west.

The Hertfordshire Local Defence Volunteers was formed at County Hall, to provide a secondary line of defence in case of invasion by the forces of Nazi Germany and other Axis powers during the Second World War, in 1940. The Hertfordshire Film Archive was established at the building in 1978. Sculptures of two deer designed by Stephen Elson were erected outside County Hall, to celebrate the fiftieth anniversary of the building, in 1989.

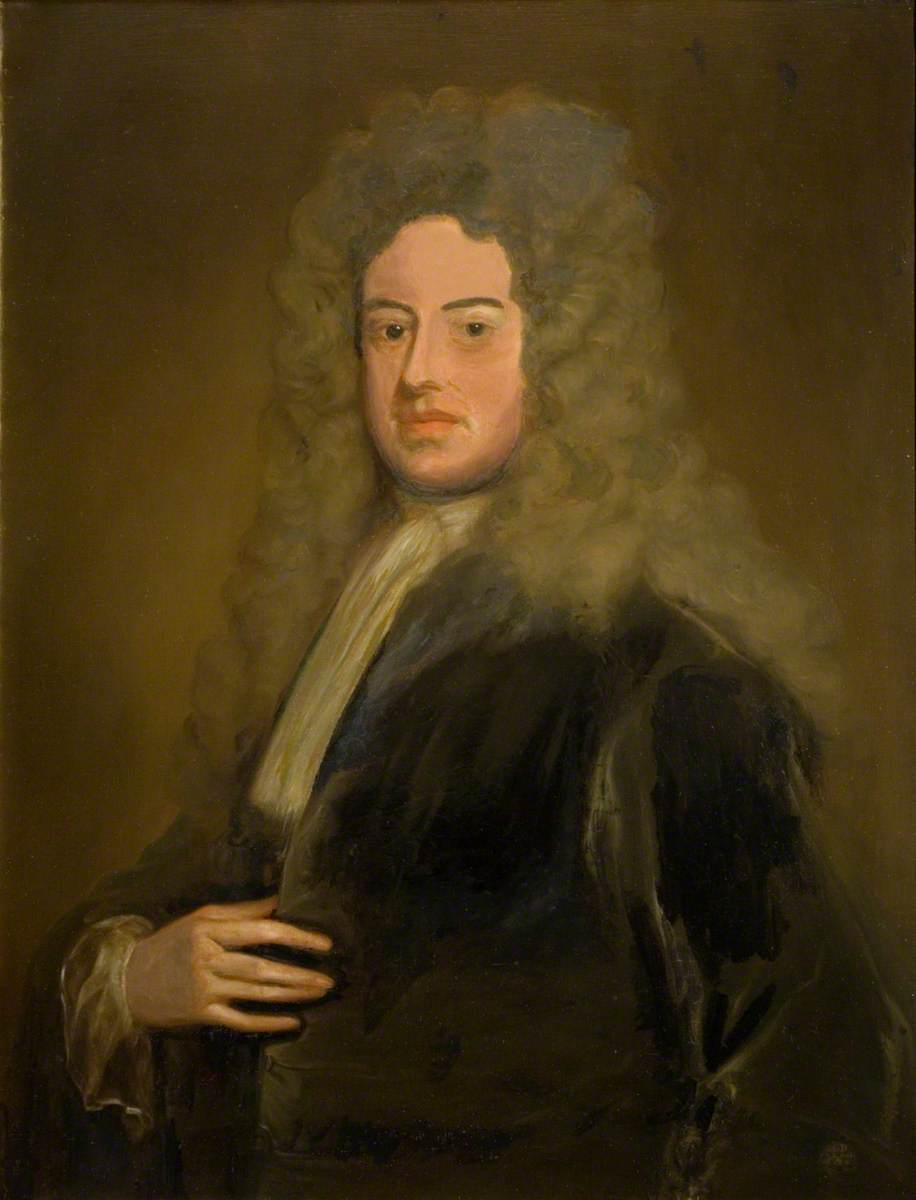
Painting of John Somers, 1st Baron Somers by Godfrey Kneller

Works of art in County Hall include a portrait of the Lord Chancellor, John Somers, 1st Baron Somers, by Godfrey Kneller and a portrait of the local member of parliament, William Plumer, by Thomas Lawrence.

In 2023, most of the county hall staff were relocated to new offices in Stevenage. Hertfordshire County Council had initially intended to retain the council chamber for council meetings, but due to high costs, the council subsequently decided instead to sell off the entire site and, in 2025, County Hall ceased to function as the seat of local government. In October 2025, County Hall and its grounds went on the market for around £50 million, advertised as "unique redevelopment opportunity". Hertfordshire County Council instead centred its operations on its Stevenage campus. A new council chamber was built at Robertson House in Stevenage, with the first council meeting being held there in December 2025.

== In popular culture ==
=== Film ===
Scenes from the biographical film The Boys in the Boat, produced by George Clooney, was filmed at County Hall in May 2022. The 2025 romantic comedy film, My Oxford Year, was filmed at County Hall in September 2024. Scenes at the Empire State University in the MCU film Spider-Man: Brand New Day were filmed at County Hall in August and September 2025.

=== Television ===
Other scenes filmed there were from the television thriller Prime Target in June 2023, from the crime series The Undertow in autumn 2023, and from the dystopian series Silo in October 2024, as well as from the crime series Grantchester and Code of Silence in October 2024 and November 2024 respectively.

== Sources ==
- Foster, Janet; Sheppard, Julia (2000) British Archives: A Guide to Archive Resources in the UK, Palgrave Macmillan, ISBN 978-0333735367
- Robinson, Gwennah. (1978) Barracuda Guide to County History, Vol III: Hertfordshire. Chesham: Barracuda Books. ISBN 0-86023-030-9.
