= St Andrew Street, Hertford =

Road in Hertford, England

Coordinates: 51.796803°N 0.081503°W

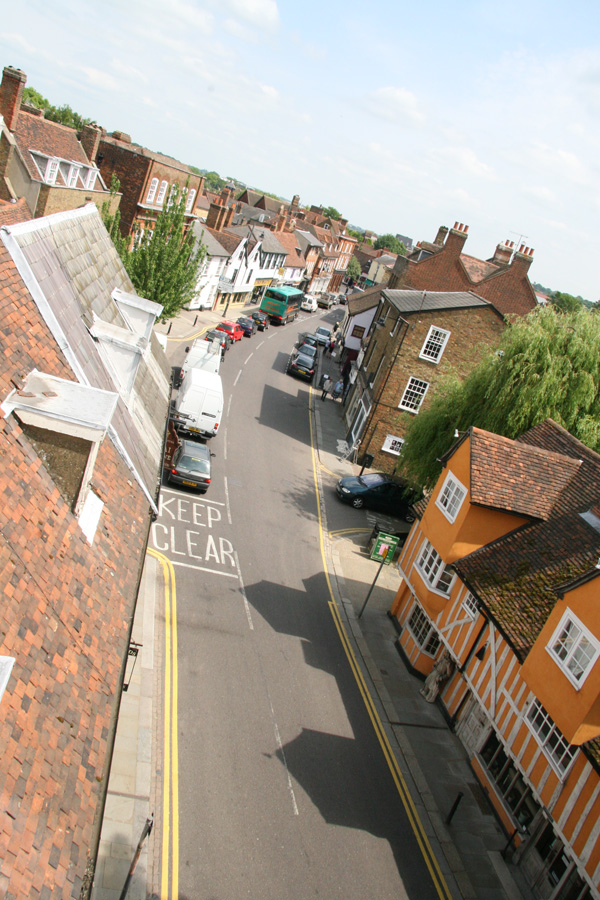
St Andrew Street, Hertford

St Andrew Street, Hertford is the west entry road to Hertford, England. It runs from North Road to Old Cross and includes shops, houses and a church. The history of the buildings on St Andrew Street date back to the 14th century.

== History ==
All the buildings in St Andrew Street have a long history, being either built or reconstructed upon an ancient site. Numbers 58 and 60 are reputed to be the oldest, perhaps 14th century or earlier.

No 43, now Beckwiths, is dated to 1450 and at the former Three Tuns, now the Baan Thitiya Thai restaurant, an 18th-century front has been added to a much earlier rear.

The majority of the properties which line St Andrew Street are listed. From the late 18th century until more recent times there were habitable yards, of which only two names remain: Brewhouse Lane – which was rebuilt in a traditional style – and Victoria Place – now extended. The former Fiddle Yard is now Arbon Court, with newly completed houses for sale. Other yards and property were swept away by the relief road in the 1960s and the Oaken Buildings were eventually replaced by the St Andrew Street car park.

The Church of St Andrew was possibly of Saxon origin and additions to the original building failed to accommodate sufficient of its worshippers. By the mid 19th century, the old church was in a parlous state and re-building was thought necessary. The new church was consecrated on 24 March 1870.

Six years later, by the generosity of Earl Cowper of Panshanger and Mr. Robert Smith of Goldings, the tower was replaced. The architect was J. Johnson of Moorgate Street and the style is of the transitional period between Early English and decorated styles of Medieval architecture.

== Shops ==
The street is now home to a number of independent traders, as well as doctor surgeries and private businesses. The church is also still there and holds regular services and group meetings, as well as weddings, charity and community events.
