= James Adam (architect) =

Scottish architect

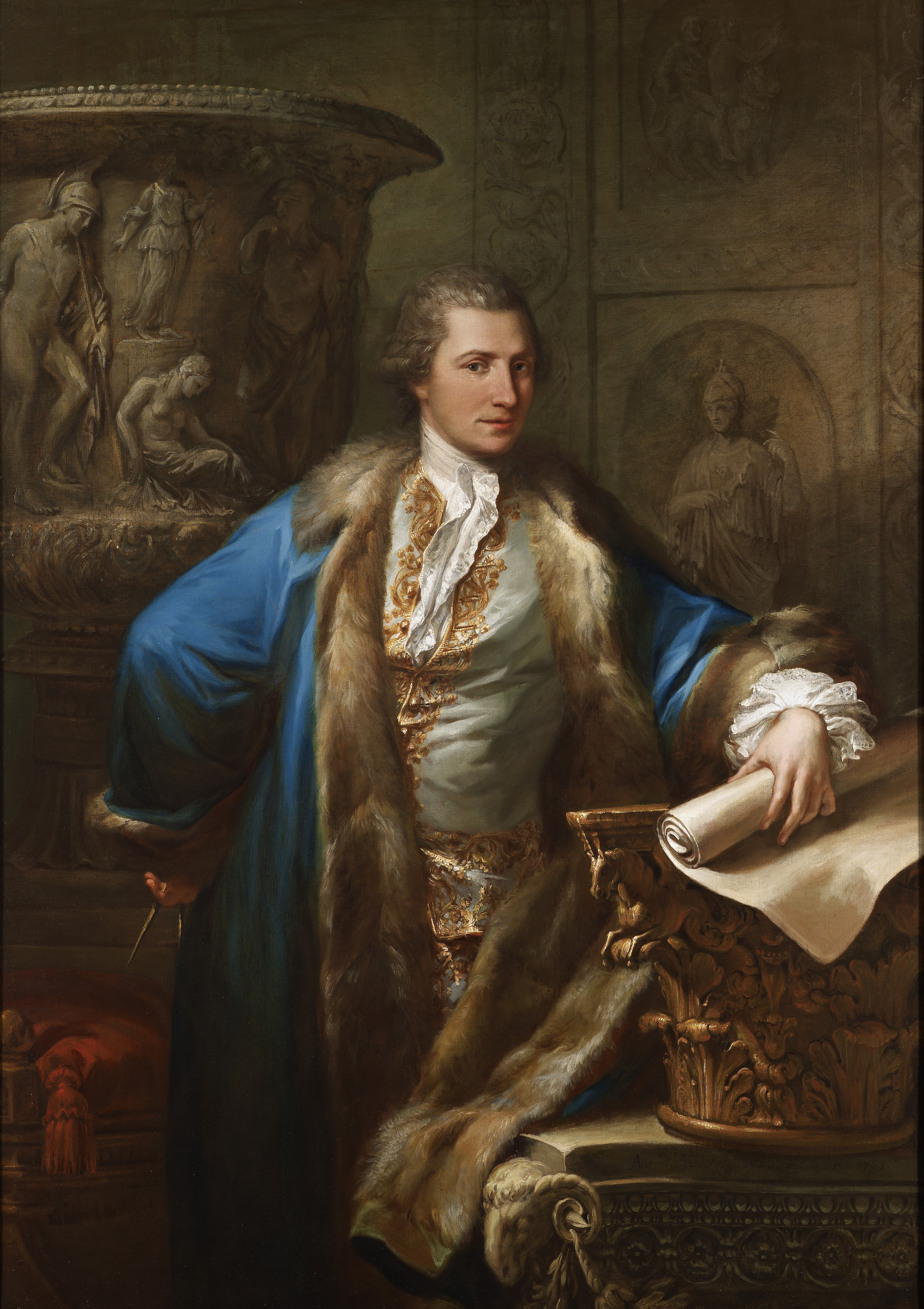
- Portrait of Adam by Antonio Zucchi
- Born: 21 July 1732; Kirkcaldy, Fife, Scotland
- Died: 20 October 1794 (aged 62); Mayfair, London, England
- Parents: William Adam (father); Mary Robertson (mother)
- Relatives: Robert Adam (brother); John Adam (brother)

James Adam (21 July 1732 – 20 October 1794) was a Scottish architect and furniture designer, but was often overshadowed by his older brother and business partner, Robert Adam. They were sons of architect William Adam.

== Life and career ==
Adam was born in Kirkcaldy, Fife in 1732 as the third son of the architect William Adam.

In 1755 Adam worked on Gunsgreen House in the Berwickshire town of Eyemouth.

In 1758, Adam, along with his brother Robert, started his business in London (living in Lower Grosvenor Street), focusing on designing complete schemes for the decoration and furnishing of houses. Palladian design was popular, but Robert had evolved a new, more flexible signature style incorporating elements of classic Roman design alongside influences from Greek, Byzantine and Baroque styles, often termed as Adam Style in conventional architecture texts. The Adam brothers' success can also be attributed to a desire to design everything down to the smallest detail, ensuring a sense of unity in their designs.

He then followed in Robert's footsteps by undertaking the Grand Tour, leaving in May 1760 and arriving back in London in October 1763.

Adam succeeded Robert as Architect of the King's Works in 1768 just before work on the brothers' Adelphi project (1768–1772) almost bankrupted the firm (the business employed other notable architects including Joseph Bonomi (1739–1808) who, from 1768, remained with the Adams until 1781).

From 1771 to 1775, he was engaged with his brother in the design and building of Wedderburn Castle near Duns, Berwickshire.

Adam emerged from his brother's shadow after Robert's death in 1792, designing several notable buildings in Glasgow, including the old Infirmary (1792; demolished 1907), Assembly Rooms (1794; demolished in 1890) and the Tron Kirk (1794). He also designed Portland Place in central London. In 1793, he was part of a group of architects that John Soane was asked to supply plans to for the House of Lords. However, he died at his home in London's Albemarle Street in 1794.

Adam had a book collection of some significance which he marked with his personal engraved bookplate.

During their lifetime Robert and James Adam published two volumes of their designs, Works in Architecture of Robert and James Adam (in 1773–1778 and 1779; a third volume was published posthumously, in 1822).

== List of architectural works ==
=== Public buildings ===
- Courts of Justice and Corn Market, Hertfordshire, now Shire Hall, Hertford (1768). Altered, but partially restored to original design. A joint project with Robert Adam.
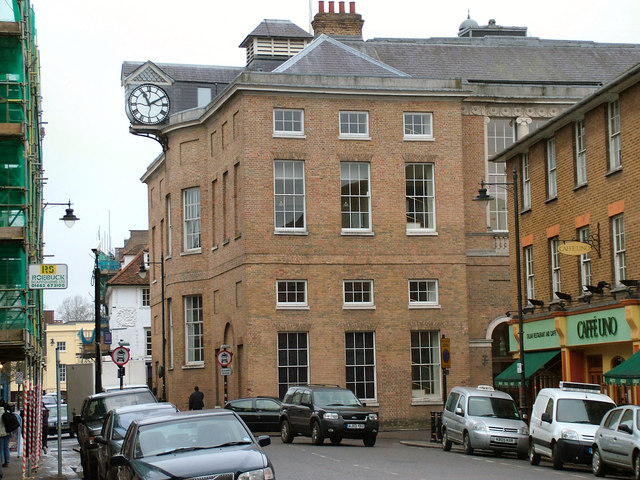
The Shire Hall, Hertford - geograph.org.uk - 142920

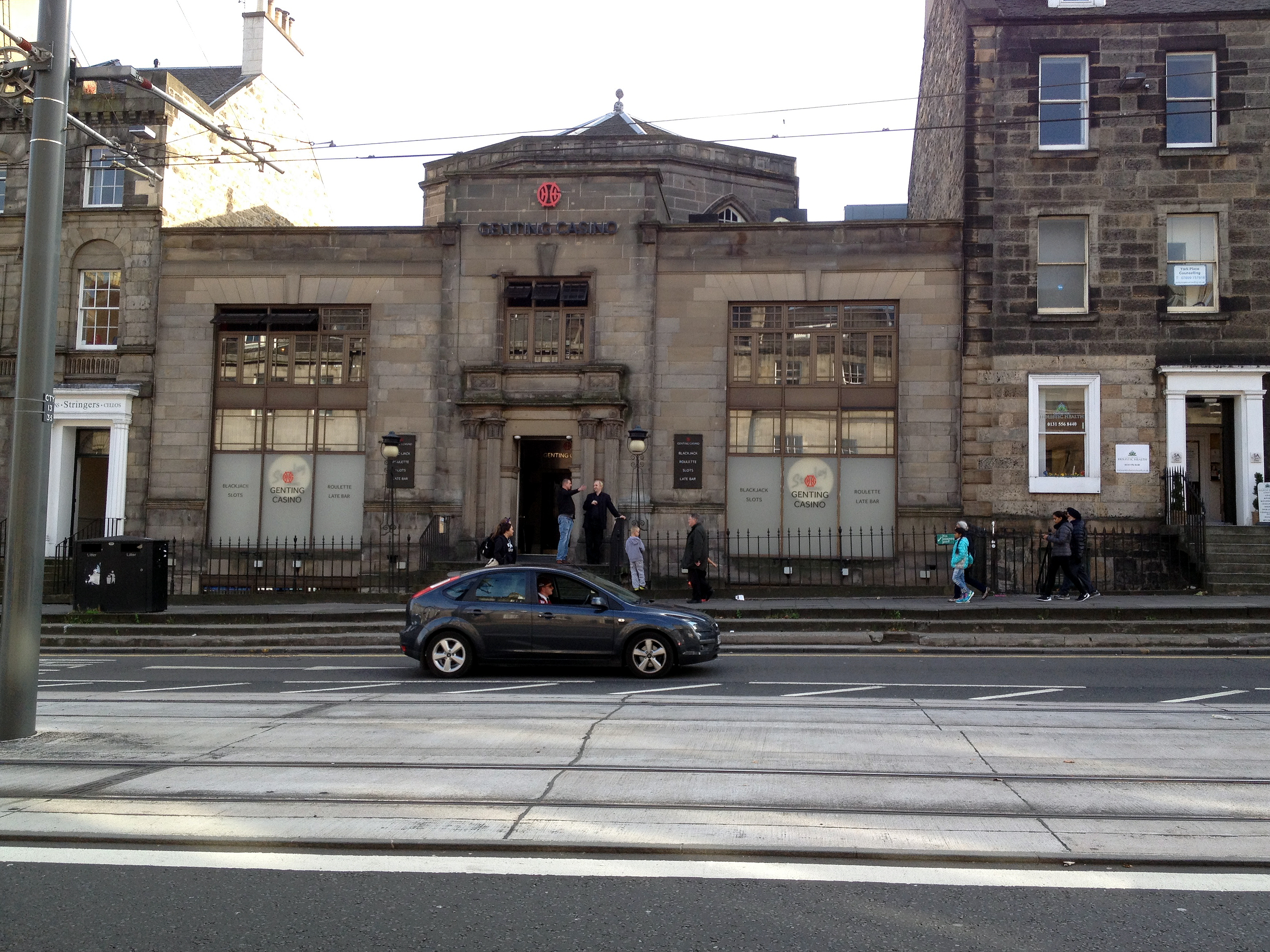
St George's Episcopal Chapel, York Place, Edinburgh (1794)

=== Urban domestic work ===
- Drumsheugh House in Edinburgh for the Erskine family (c. 1756)
- The Adelphi development, London (1768–1775) mostly demolished 1930s, a ceiling & fireplace are in the Victoria and Albert Museum
- 7 Adam Street
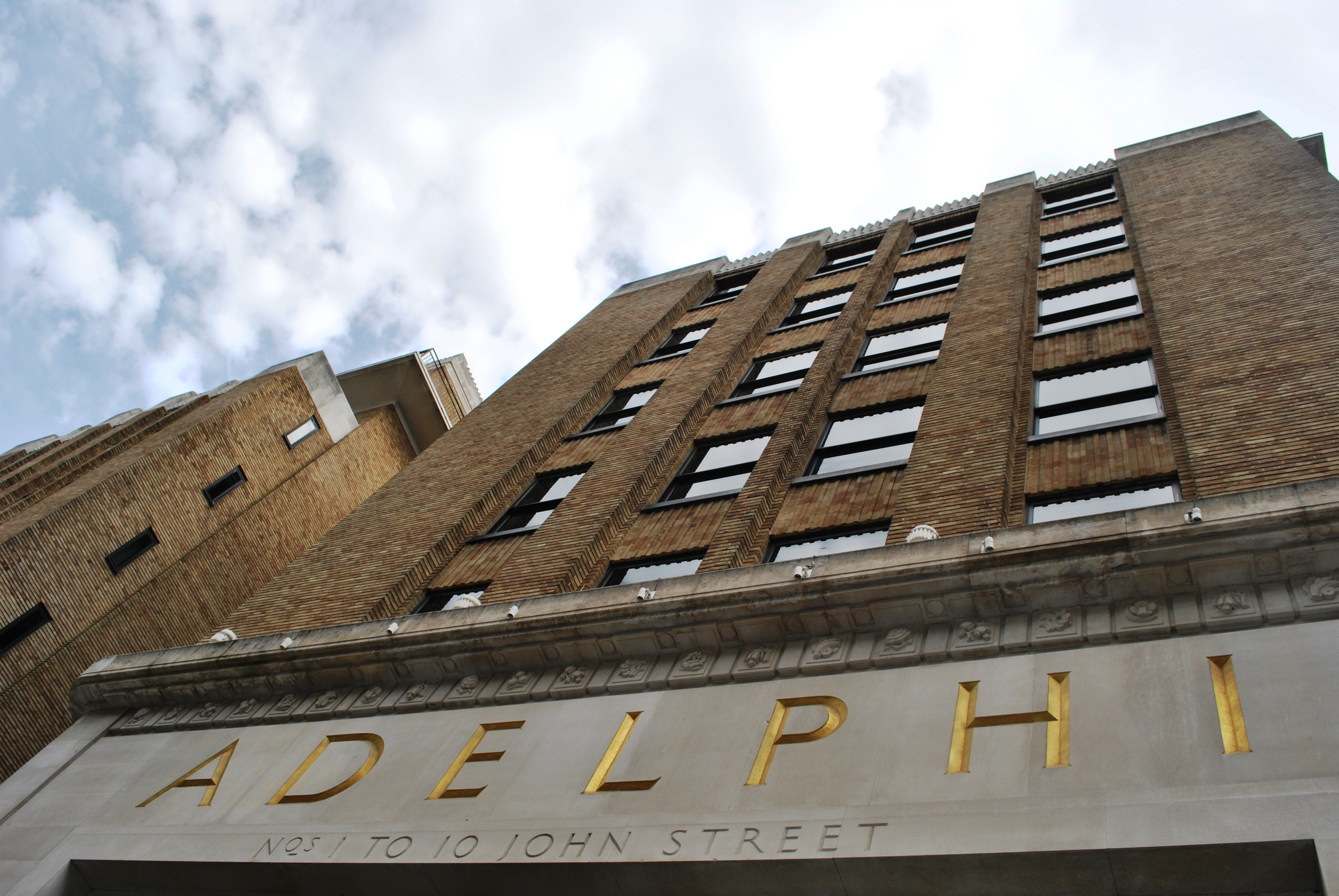
The Adelphi, London, largely demolished

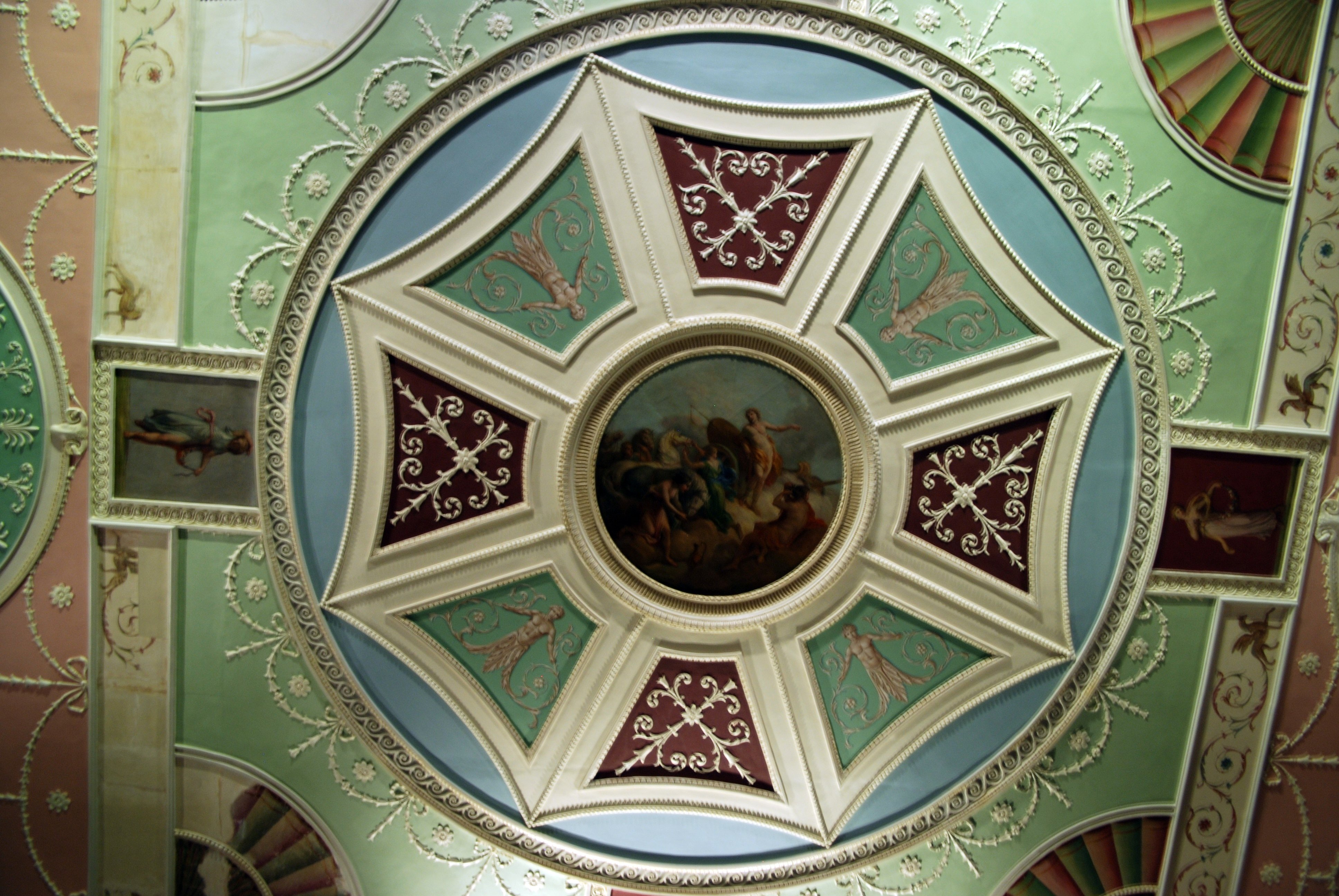
Robert Adam ceiling from the Adelphi, now in the V&A

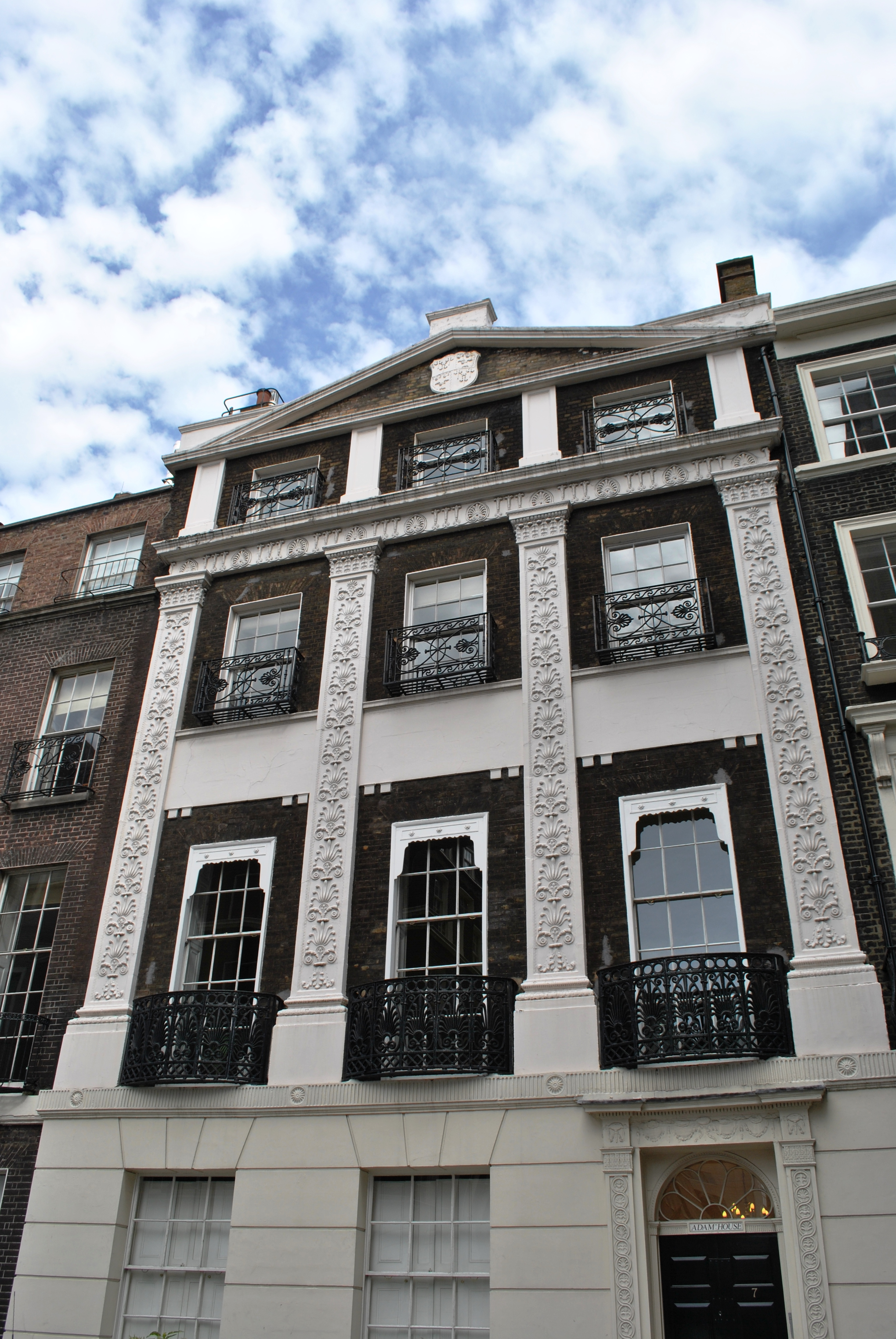
7 Adam Street

=== Country houses with major work ===
- Gunsgreen House, Berwickshire (1755)
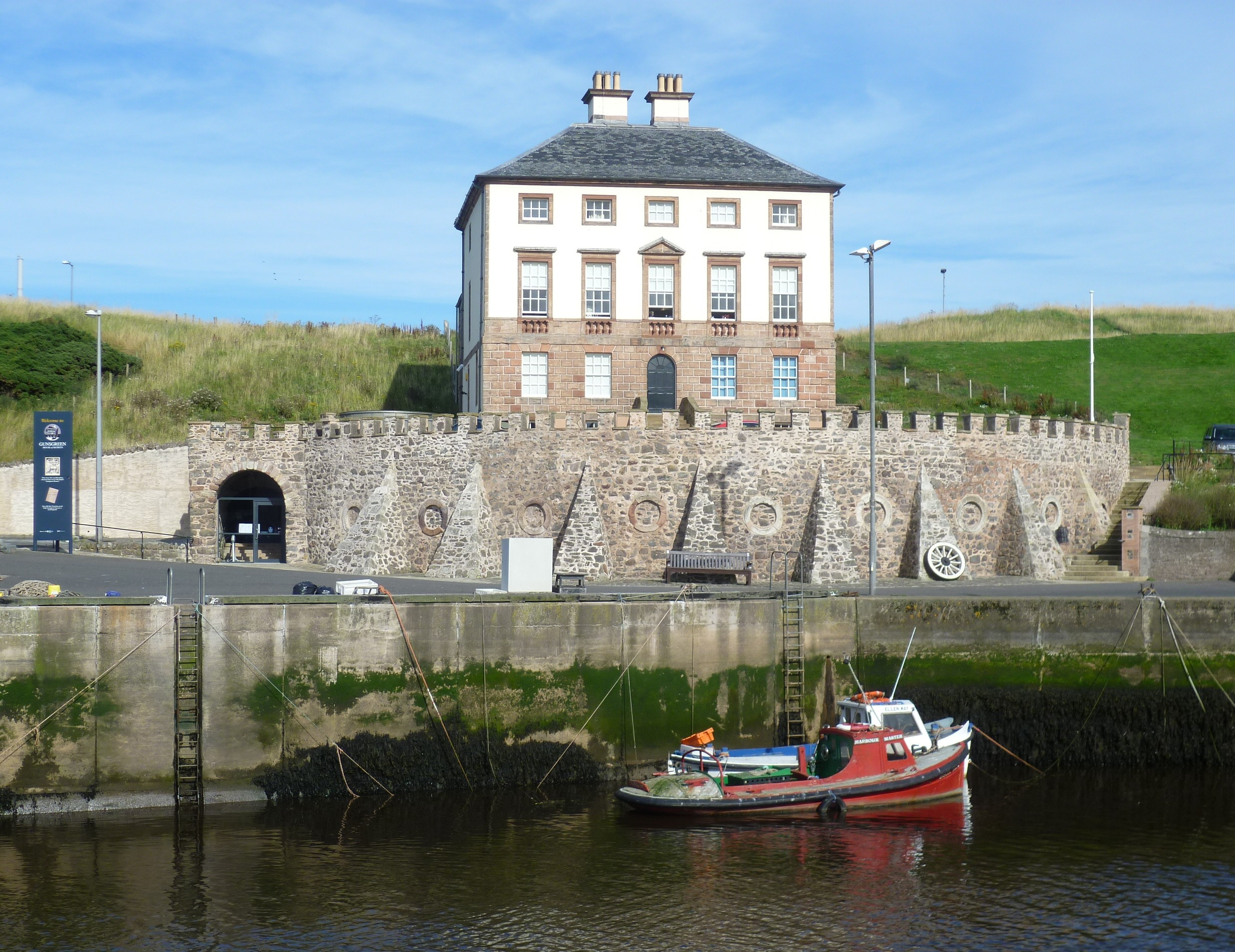
Gunsgreen House

== See also ==
- Adam style
