= Hertfordshire County Council =

British administrative body

Type
- Type: Non-metropolitan county

Leadership
- Chair: Laurence Brass, Liberal Democrat since 20 May 2025
- Leader: Steve Jarvis, Liberal Democrat since 20 May 2025
- Chief Executive: Angie Ridgwell since September 2024

Structure
- Seats: 78 councillors
- Political groups: Administration (31) Liberal Democrat (31) Opposition (47) Conservative (22) Reform (13) Green (5) Labour (5) Restore Britain (1) Independent (1)
- Joint committees: East of England Local Government Association
- Length of term: 4 years

Elections
- Voting system: First past the post
- Last election: 1 May 2025
- Next election: 2029

Meeting place
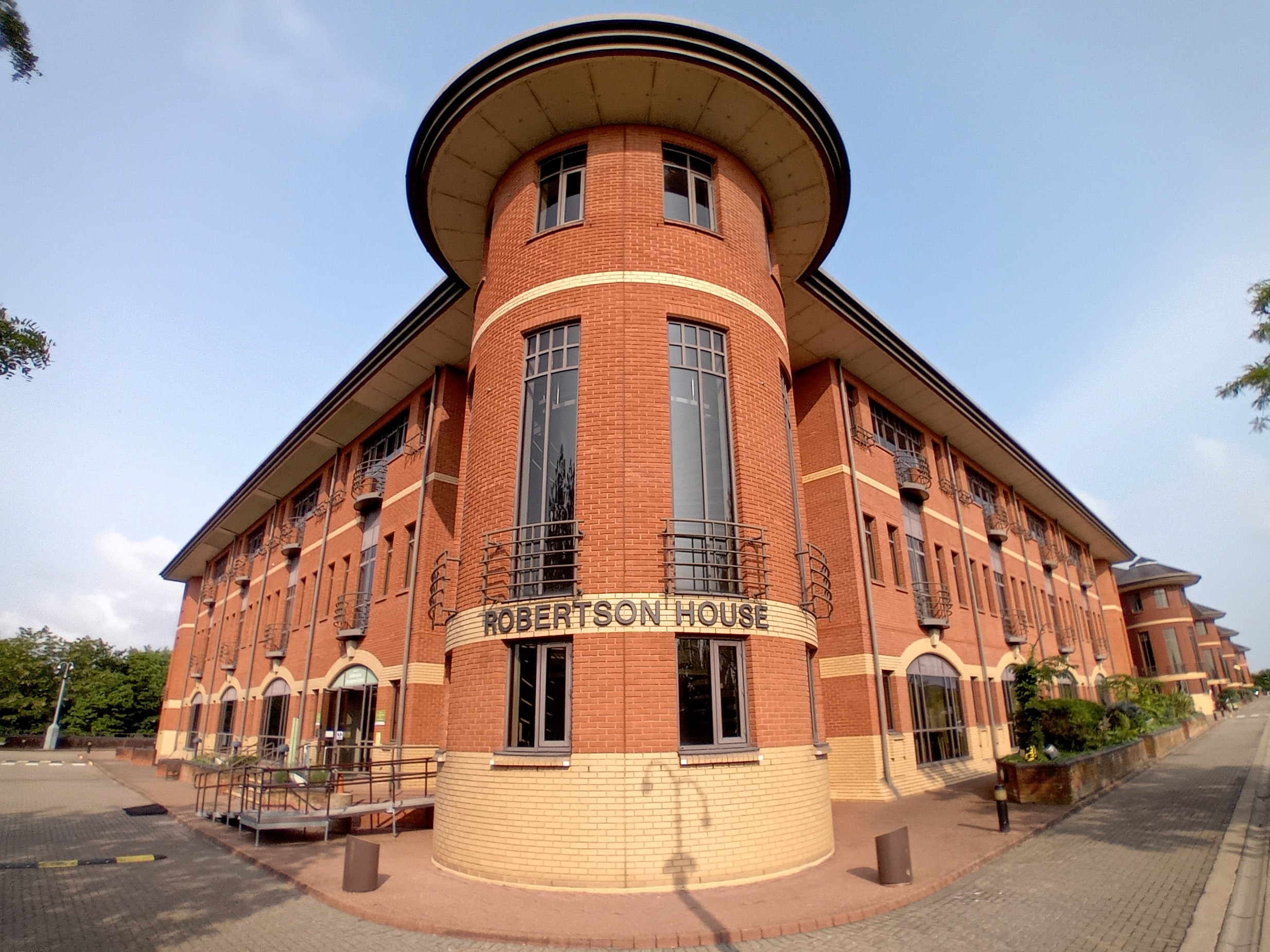
- Robertson House, Six Hills Way, Stevenage, SG1 2FQ

Website
- www.hertfordshire.gov.uk

Hertfordshire County Council is the upper-tier local authority for the non-metropolitan county of Hertfordshire, in England. The council was created in 1889. It is responsible for a wide range of public services in the county, including social care, transport, education, and the Hertfordshire Fire and Rescue Service. The Liberal Democrats have held a plurality of the seats on the council since May 2025, and currently run the council as a minority administration. The council meets and has its main offices at Robertson House in Stevenage.

== History ==
Elected county councils were created under the Local Government Act 1888, taking over many administrative functions that had previously been performed by unelected magistrates at the quarter sessions.

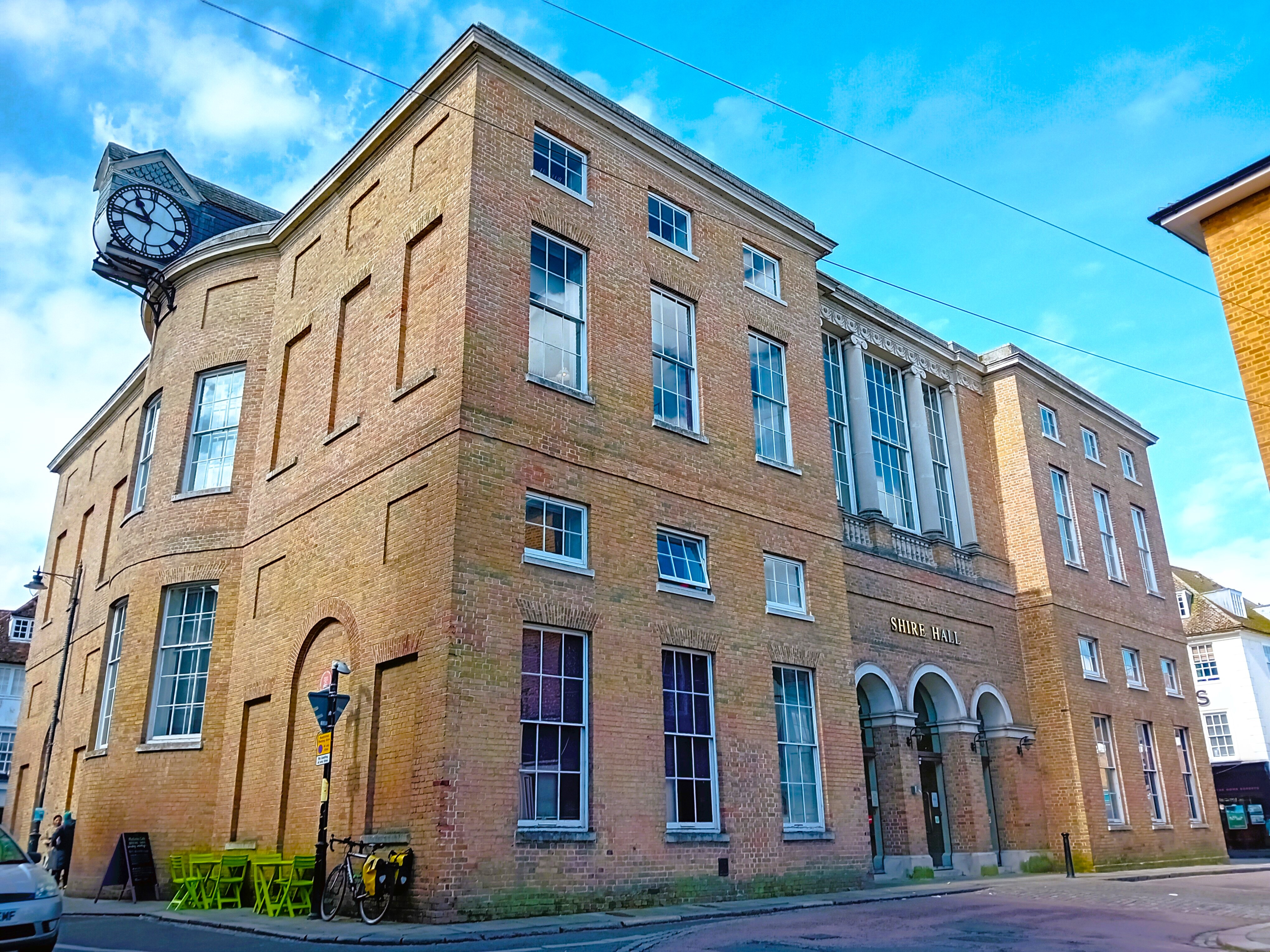
Shire Hall, Hertford: Council's first meeting place

The first elections were held in January 1889, and the council formally came into being on 1 April 1889, on which day it held its first meeting at Shire Hall, Hertford, the courthouse (built 1771) which had served as the meeting place of the quarter sessions which preceded the county council. The first chairman of the council was Francis Cowper, 7th Earl Cowper, who was also a Liberal member of the House of Lords.

Local government across England and Wales was reformed in 1974 under the Local Government Act 1972, establishing a system of upper-tier county councils and lower-tier district councils. The 1972 Act classed Hertfordshire as a non-metropolitan county, which determined the division of responsibilities between the county council and the ten district councils which were created in Hertfordshire.

== Governance ==
The council provides county-level services. District-level services are provided by the county's ten district councils. Much of the county is also covered by civil parishes, which form a third tier of local government for their areas.

=== Political control ===
The council has been under no overall control since the 2025 election, with the Liberal Democrats the largest party and running the council as a minority administration.

Political control of the county council since 1974 has been as follows:

Party in control	Years
No overall control	1974–1977
Conservative	1977–1985
No overall control	1985–1989
Conservative	1989–1993
No overall control	1993–1999
Conservative	1999–2025
No overall control	2025–present

=== Leadership ===
The leaders of the council since 1995 have been:

Councillor	Party	From	To
John Metcalf	Labour	1995	15 Jun 1999
Robert Ellis	Conservative	15 Jun 1999	21 Mar 2006
David Beatty	Conservative	28 Mar 2006	26 Sep 2007
Robert Gordon	Conservative	9 Oct 2007	6 Oct 2017
David Williams	Conservative	21 Nov 2017	25 May 2021
Richard Roberts	Conservative	25 May 2021	20 May 2025
Steve Jarvis	Liberal Democrats	20 May 2025	

=== Composition ===
After the 2025 election and changes of allegiance and by-elections up to May 2026, the composition of the council was:

Party	Councillors
Liberal Democrats	32
Conservative	22
Reform	13
Green	5
Labour	4
Restore	1
Independent	1
Total:	78

== Premises ==
The council meets and has its main offices at Robertson House and adjoining buildings off Six Hills Way and Gunnels Wood Road in Stevenage. The complex of modern office buildings had served as offices for the council for some years, and also became the council's meeting place in 2025 when a new council chamber was built there. The first meeting in the new chamber at Robertson House was held in December 2025.

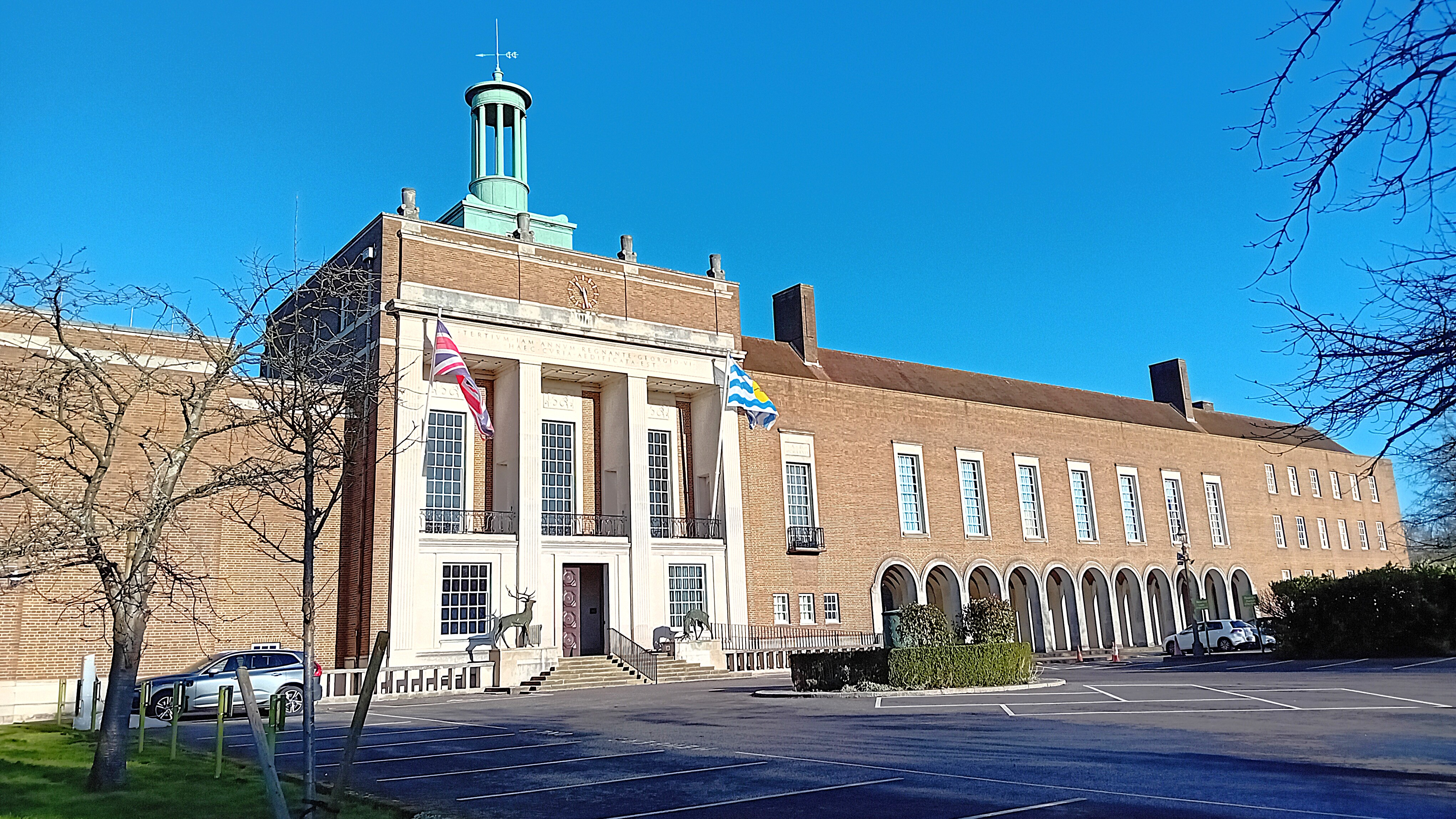
County Hall, Pegs Lane, Hertford: Council's meeting place and offices 1939–2025

Prior to 2025, the council met at County Hall on Pegs Lane in Hertford, lying to the south-west of the town centre. The building was completed in 1939; there was no opening ceremony due to the outbreak of the Second World War. County Hall also served as the council's main offices. During the early 2020s, most staff were relocated to other offices, particularly those in Stevenage. By mid-2025, County Hall was said to be only used for a couple of meetings per week. The council therefore decided to move its meetings to Stevenage too, and to put County Hall up for sale.

The council also has offices in Hemel Hempstead and Welwyn Garden City.

== Elections ==
Elections are held every four years, interspersed by three years of elections to the ten district councils in the county. Since the last boundary changes in 2017, there have been 78 electoral divisions electing one councillor each.

== Abolition ==
local government restructuring in Hertfordshire

Hertfordshire's 10 districts and boroughs 1974-2028

The four new unitary authorities in Hertfordshire from 2028

In July 2026, it was announced that Hertfordshire County Council is to be abolished and replaced by four new unitary authorities. The changes are being enacted as part of ongoing local government restructuring in England. The county's 10 constituent district and borough councils will also cease to exist. From 1 April 2028 Hertfordshire is to be divided into four new areas:

- West Hertfordshire: a merger of Dacorum and the City of St Albans
- South West Hertfordshire: a merger of Hertsmere, Three Rivers and Watford
- Central Hertfordshire: a merger of most of North Hertfordshire with Stevenage and Welwyn Hatfield
- East Hertfordshire and Broxbourne: a merger of Broxbourne and East Hertfordshire, with the addition of some parts of North Hertfordshire District in the north and of Welwyn Hatfield Borough in the south

Elections to the new "shadow" authorities will take place in May 2027, and they will officially take over on 1 April 2028.
