= Simon Balle All-through School =

Location
- Mangrove Road; Hertford, Hertfordshire, SG13 8AJ; England; 51.7932°N 0.0698°W

Information
- Former name: Simon Balle School
- Type: Academy
- Motto: Creating tomorrow’s citizens today
- Religious affiliation: All
- Established: 1957
- Department for Education URN: 140294 Tables
- Ofsted: Reports
- Chair of Governors: Sarah Mansfield
- Co-headteachers: Rachel Kirk & Michael Moss
- Gender: Mixed
- Age: 4 to 18
- Enrolment: 1489
- Houses: Ashbourne, Beane, Lea, Mimram, New, Rib
- Colours: Hunter Green, Maroon
- Website: http://www.simonballe.herts.sch.uk/

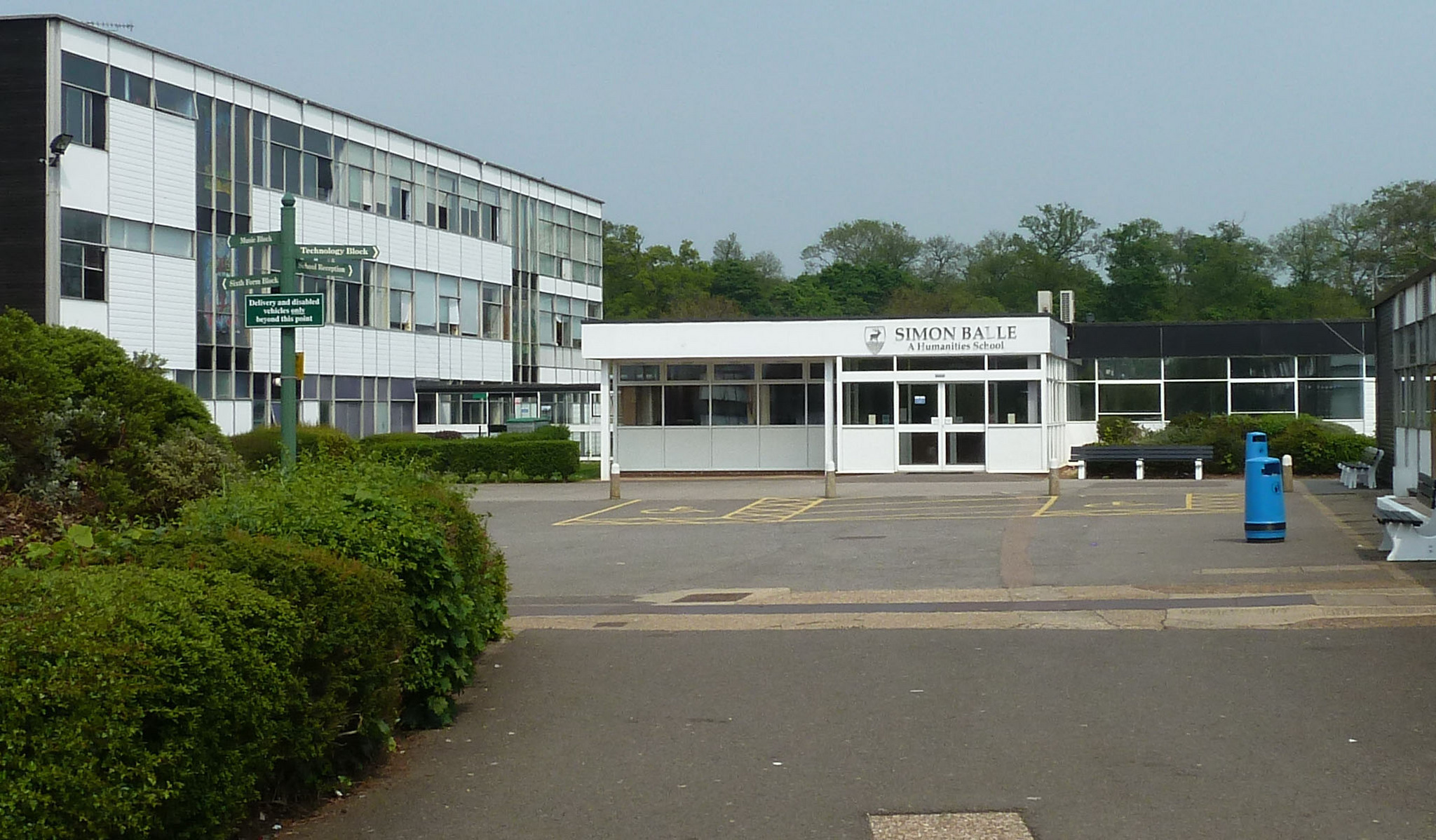
Simon Balle School entrance

Simon Balle All-through School is a co-educational secondary school, sixth form, and most recently primary school with academy status located in Hertford, Hertfordshire, England. Its name derives from Simon de Balle, one of two deputies (MPs) sent to Parliament to represent the Borough in 1298. He owned Balls Park, which is adjacent to the school's location. The school converted to academy status on 1 November 2013.

== Simon Balle Primary school ==
Due to the overcrowding of other primary schools Simon Balle built a primary school, . The school is now known as the "Simon Balle All-through School", as it offers education from the age of 4 with a reception class up until students leave year 11 at age 16 or stay on until age 18 in sixth form.

== Notable former pupils ==
- George Ezra – singer-songwriter and musician.

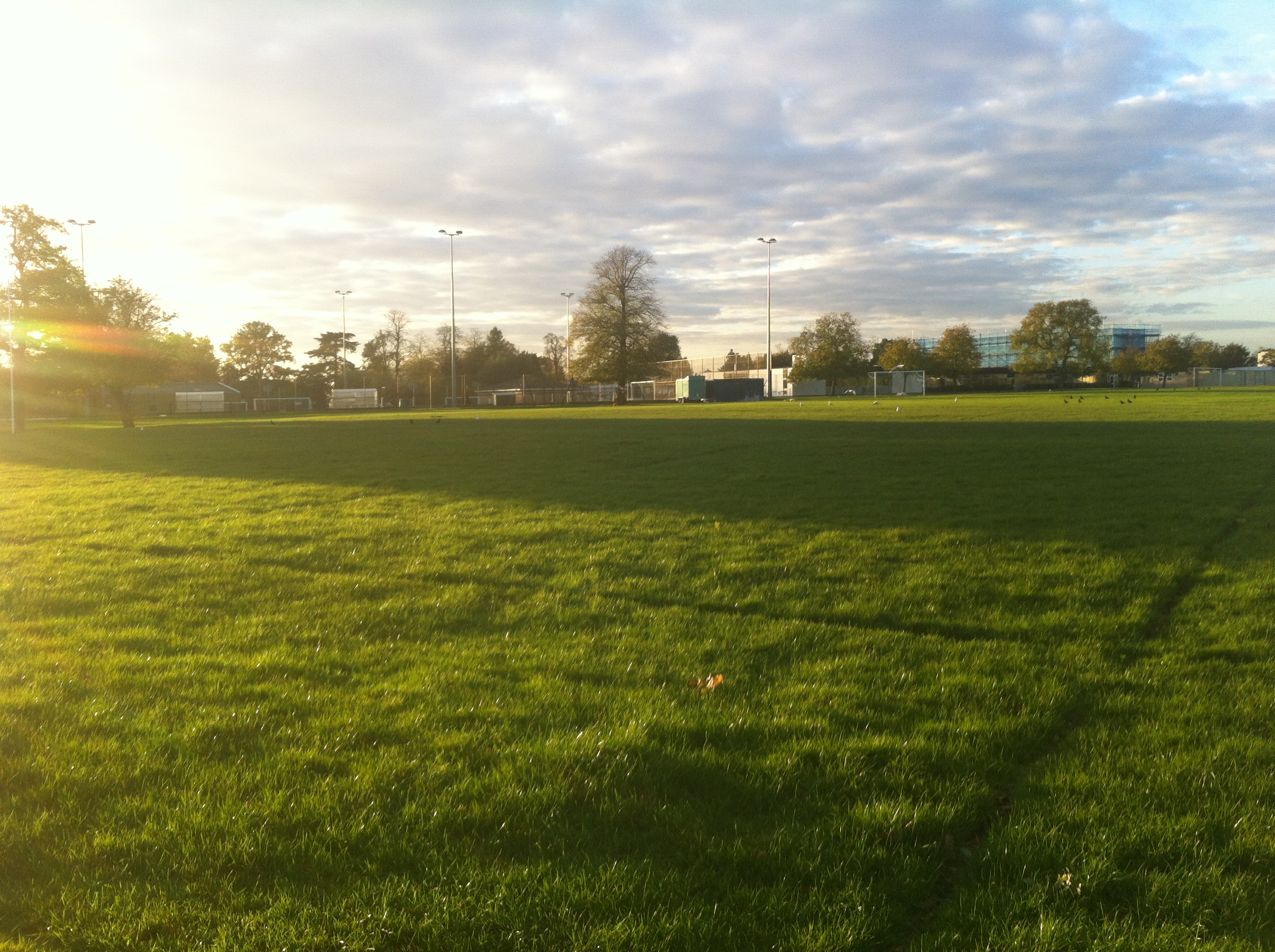
Grounds
