= Hertford =

Market town and civil parish in Hertfordshire, England

Coordinates: 51.79662°N 0.07735°W

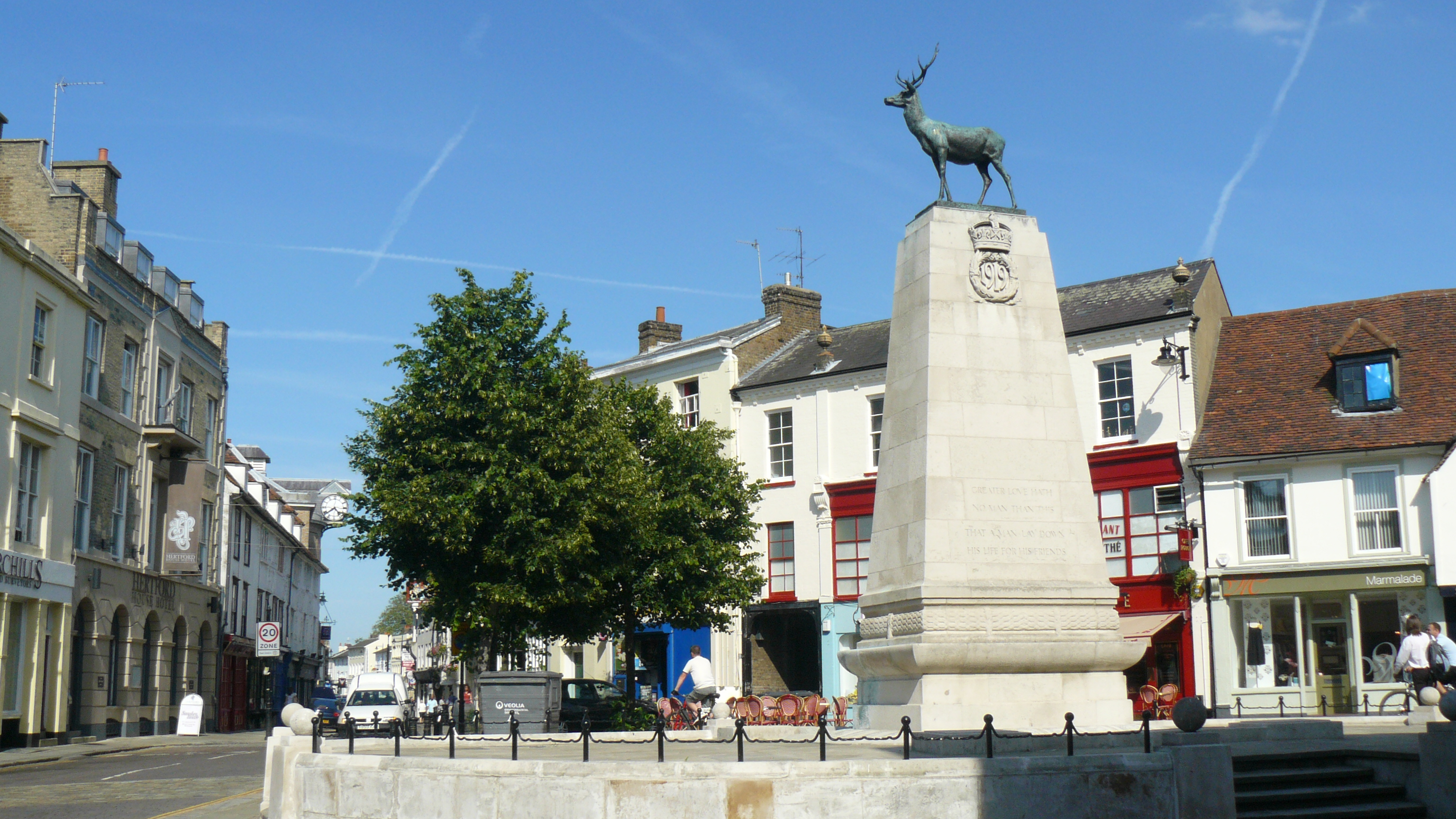
- Parliament Square, Hertford Town Centre

- Location within Hertfordshire
- Population: 29,418 (Parish, 2021); 28,800 (Built up area, 2021)
- OS grid reference: TL325125
  - London: 19.2 mi (30.9 km) S
- Civil parish: Hertford
- District: East Hertfordshire
- Shire county: Hertfordshire
- Region: East
- Country: England
- Sovereign state: United Kingdom
- Post town: HERTFORD
- Postcode district: SG13, SG14
- Dialling code: 01992
- Police: Hertfordshire
- Fire: Hertfordshire
- Ambulance: East of England
- UK Parliament: Hertford and Stortford
- Website: www.hertford.gov.uk

Hertford (/ˈhɑːrt.fərd/, HART-fərd) is a market town and civil parish in the East Hertfordshire district of the county of Hertfordshire, England. It is the county town of Hertfordshire and lies 20 miles (32 km) north of Charing Cross in Central London. At the 2021 census the parish had a population of 29,418 and the built up area had a population of 28,800.

The town grew around a ford on the River Lea, near its confluences with the rivers Mimram, Beane, and Rib. The Lea is navigable from the Thames up to Hertford. Fortified settlements were established on each side of the ford at Hertford in 913 AD. The county of Hertfordshire was established at a similar time, being named after and administered from Hertford. Hertford Castle was built shortly after the Norman Conquest and remained a royal residence until the early seventeenth century.

Hertfordshire County Council and East Hertfordshire District Council both have their main offices in the town and are major local employers, as is McMullen's Brewery, which has been based in the town since 1827. The town is also popular with commuters, having two railway lines connecting it to London.

== Toponymy ==
The earliest reference to the town appears in the Ecclesiastical History of the English People, written by Bede in 731 AD, which refers to Herutford. Herut is the Old English spelling of hart, meaning a fully mature stag; thus the meaning of the name is a ford where harts are found. The Domesday Book of 1086 gives a spelling of Hertforde.

== History ==
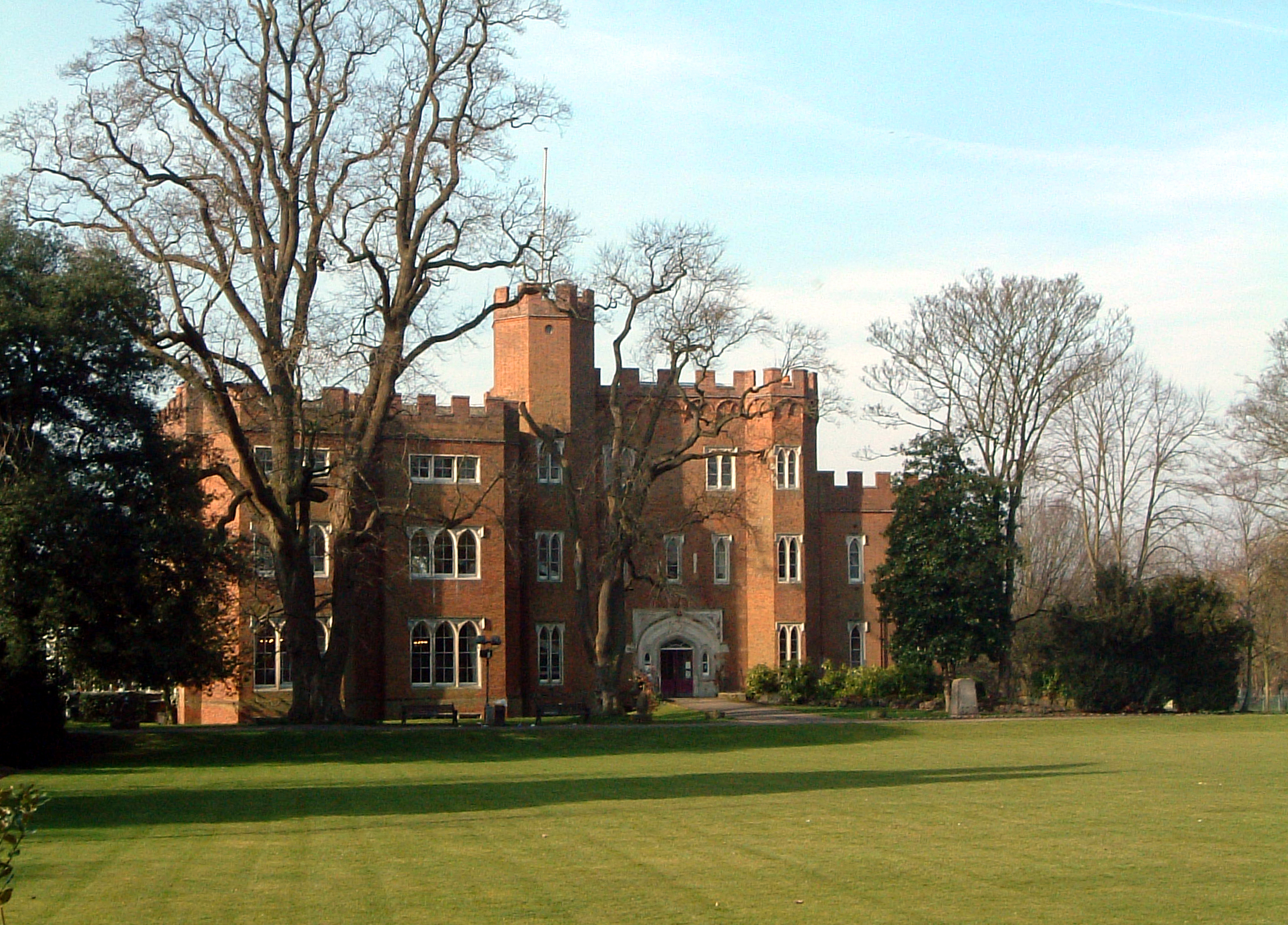
Hertford Castle

One possible earlier mention of the town was in 672 AD: the first synod of a number of the bishops in England was held either in Hertford or at Hartford, Cambridgeshire. The synod was called by Theodore of Tarsus; decisions included the calculation of the date of Easter.

The Anglo-Saxon Chronicle records that in 913 AD, Edward the Elder ordered the construction of two burhs (earthwork fortifications) either side of the ford over the River Lea at Hertford as part of his campaign against the Danes. (Note: Some sources differ on the date of the founding of the burhs. Stenton (1943) gives the date as 911 whilst Williamson (2000) gives it as 912. Ingram (1823), Giles (1847), Thorpe (1861) and Rook (1997) agree on 913. Page (1912) uses "about 913". All derive their view from different interpretations and translations of the various surviving versions (A to F) of the Anglo-Saxon Chronicle: Text A (Winchester) gives the year (in Roman numerals) as 913, but several dates around this section seem to have been adjusted later, and it appears that the year was originally written as 912. The numerals for 914 to 916 also appear in the margin alongside the entry concerning Hertford.; Text B (Abingdon I) does not date the years around this time, but the text clearly marks the start of the entry for each year. A later hand has added dates in the margin, assigning 913 to the entry concerning Hertford.; Texts C (Abingdon II) and D (Worcester) both unambiguously assign the year 913 to the Hertford entry.; Texts E (Peterborough) and F (Canterbury) both have gaps for the years around this time.; The four texts which mention the fortification of Hertford agree that the northern burh was founded around St. Martin's Day (or Martinmas), and the southern burh built between the following rogationtide and midsummer. All four texts present these events within a single paragraph, without indicating that a new year has started. Some sources take this to mean that the northern burh was built around the feast of St Martin of Tours on 11 November and the southern burh in the spring of the following year. Thorpe (1861) proposed that the St Martin's Day in question was more likely to be 14 April, which was formerly marked as the anniversary of St Martin the Confessor, which would place the construction of the northern burh around April and the southern burh in May and June of the same year.)

By the time of the Domesday Book, Hertford had two churches, two markets and three mills. The Normans began work on Hertford Castle, and Hertford Priory was founded by Ralph de Limesy. King Henry II rebuilt the castle in stone, but in 1216, during the First Barons' War, it was besieged and captured after 25 days by Prince Louis of France. The castle was regularly visited by English royalty and in 1358, Queen Isabella, wife of Edward II, died there. The priory was dissolved in 1536 and subsequently demolished. In 1563, the Parliament of England met at the castle because of an outbreak of plague in London.

Hertford grew and prospered as a market and county town; communication was improved by the construction of the Lea Navigation Canal in 1767 and the arrival of the railway in 1843. The Port Hill drill hall was completed in 1898 and Yeomanry House was brought into military use in 1910.

Samuel Stone was born in Fore Street, Hertford in 1602. He became a Puritan minister and emigrated to America, where he settled at a Native American community called Saukiog in Connecticut. He was instrumental in developing the community into a city, renaming it Hartford in 1637, after his birthplace. A statue of Samuel Stone was erected in The Wash in the centre of Hertford in 1999.

== Governance ==
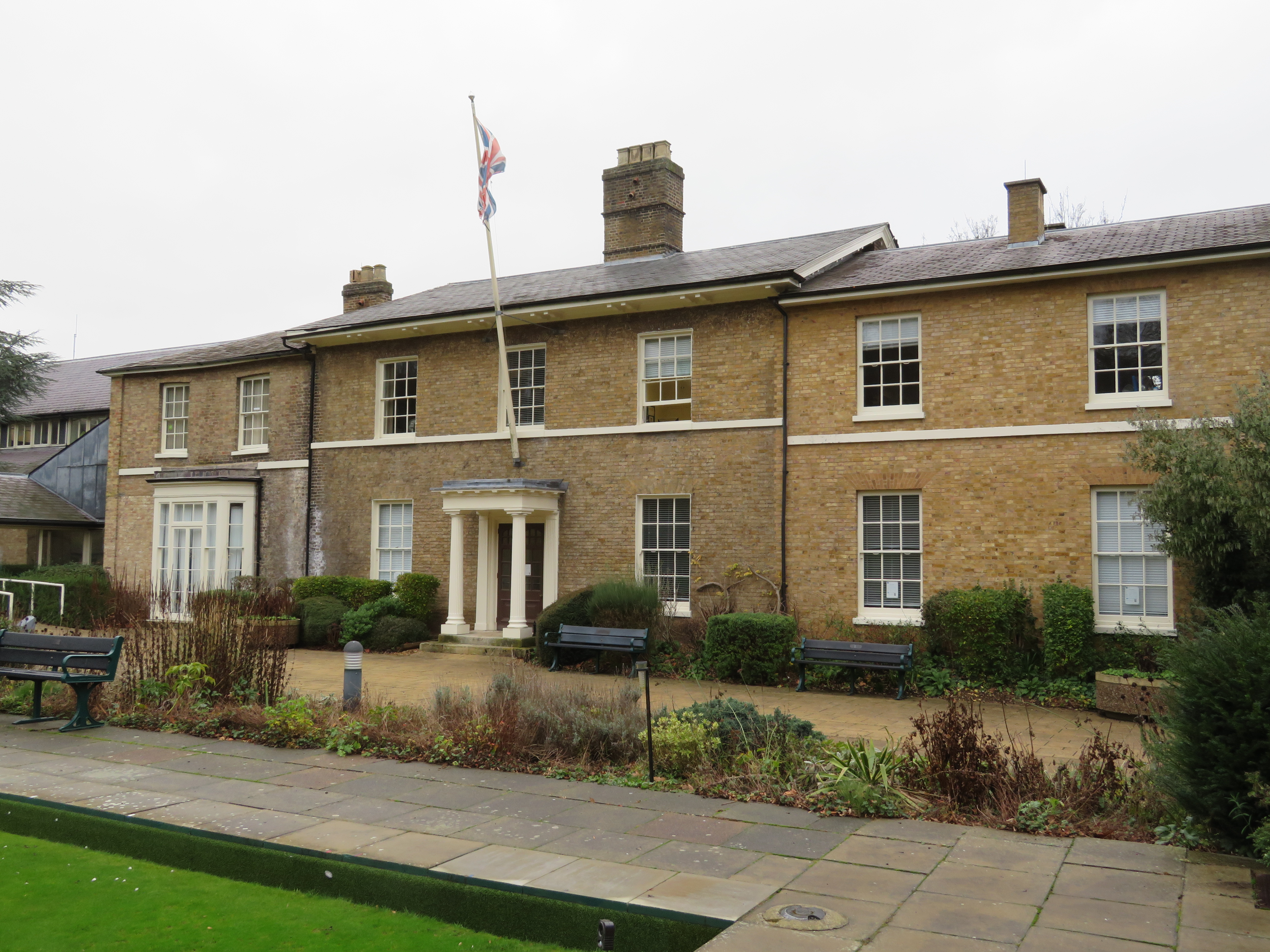
Wallfields, Pegs Lane: Headquarters of East Hertfordshire District Council

There are three tiers of local government covering Hertford, at parish (town), district, and county level: Hertford Town Council, East Hertfordshire District Council, and Hertfordshire County Council. The town council is based at Hertford Castle. The district council is also based in the town, at Wallfields on Pegs Lane. The county council was formerly also based in the town, at County Hall, but moved its main offices and meeting place to Stevenage in 2025.

=== Administrative history ===
Hertford was an ancient borough, and served as the county town of Hertfordshire from the county's formation in Saxon times. The town also gave its name to the hundred of Hertford.

The borough evolved from the burhs established either side of the Lea in 913. Hertford was described as having burgesses in the Domesday Book of 1086, indicating that it was then administered as a borough. A government survey in 1834 noted that Hertford's earliest surviving municipal charter dated from 1554.

The borough was initially governed by the king's reeves. By the thirteenth century, the reeves had been replaced by a bailiff, elected by the burgesses. Charters of 1554 and 1589 established a common council of eleven chief burgesses and a bailiff. Another charter of 1605 changed the bailiff's title to mayor.

The borough boundaries appear to have initially covered a relatively small area of what is now the town centre. The earliest known description of the borough boundaries dates from 1621. The boundaries were significantly enlarged under a new charter of 1680 to cover the built up area as it then was.

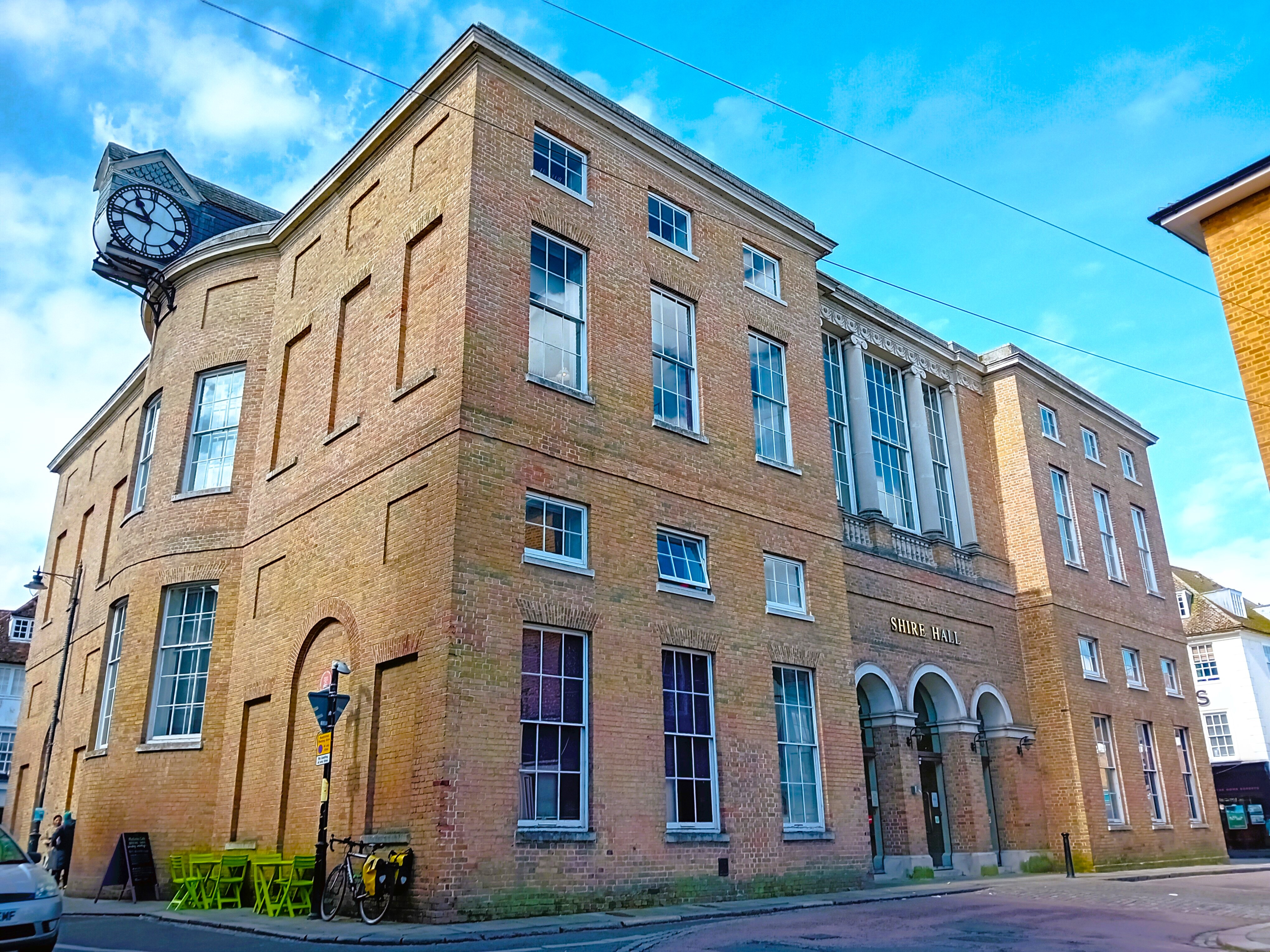
Shire Hall

The borough was reformed to become a municipal borough in 1836 under the Municipal Corporations Act 1835, which standardised how most boroughs operated across the country. As part of those reforms, the borough boundaries were enlarged to match the Hertford constituency. The borough was then administered by a body formally called the "mayor, aldermen and burgesses of the borough of Hertford", generally known as the corporation. The corporation used part of the Shire Hall as its town hall until 1911, when it moved into the surviving gatehouse of Hertford Castle.

The borough boundaries were enlarged in 1892, when the added areas included Bengeo on the north bank of the River Beane. The borough was enlarged again in 1935, when the added areas included the village of Hertingfordbury to the west of the town.

The borough of Hertford was abolished in 1974 under the Local Government Act 1972. District-level functions passed to the new East Hertfordshire District Council. A successor parish called Hertford was created covering the former borough, with its parish council taking the name Hertford Town Council.

=== Coat of arms ===
From at least 1634, Hertford Corporation used an escutcheon (shield) depicting a hart above water to indicate a ford. The borough council was granted the right to complement its arms with a badge in 1925, and supporters were added in 1937. The arms were transferred to the new town council in 1975.

Coat of arms of Hertford Town Council
Escutcheon Argent on water barry wavy a hart lodged Proper (recorded at the 1634 visitation). Supporters On either side a lion Ermine gorged with a collar pendent therefrom by a chain Gules an escutcheon Or charged with three chevrons also Gules (granted 20 October 1937). Motto Pride In Our Past Faith In Our Future Other elements Standard: Argent the bands Azure fimbriated and inscribed Pro Hertfordae honore Gold fringed Argent and Azure. Badge Within a chaplet of roses Gules a hart's head caboshed Proper between the attires an escutcheon Or charged with three chevronels Gules (granted 23 September 1925).

== Geography ==
Hertford is at the confluence of four river valleys: the Rib, Beane and Mimram join the River Lea at Hertford to flow east and then south toward the Thames as the Lee Navigation, after Hertford Castle Weir. The shared valley of the Lea and the Beane is called Hartham Common and this provides a large park to one side of the town centre running towards Ware and lying below the ridge upon which Bengeo is situated.

The town centre still has its medieval layout with many timber-framed buildings hidden under later frontages, particularly in St Andrew Street. Hertford suffers from traffic problems caused by the existence of the 1960s A414 dual carriageway called Gascoyne Way which carved through the town, destroying many historic buildings in its path and cutting off the southern part of the town from the northern part. Plans have long existed to connect the A10 with the A414 on the west side of Hertford, a proper bypass, but they have so far foundered. Nevertheless, the town retains very much a country-town feel, despite lying only 19.2 miles (30.9 km) north of Central London. This is aided by its proximity to larger towns such as Harlow, Bishop's Stortford and Stevenage where modern development has been focused.

Suburbs and estates

- Bengeo
- Foxholes Estate
- Horns Mill
- Rush Green
- Sele Farm

Nearby Hertford

- Hertford Heath
- Hertingfordbury
- Waterford

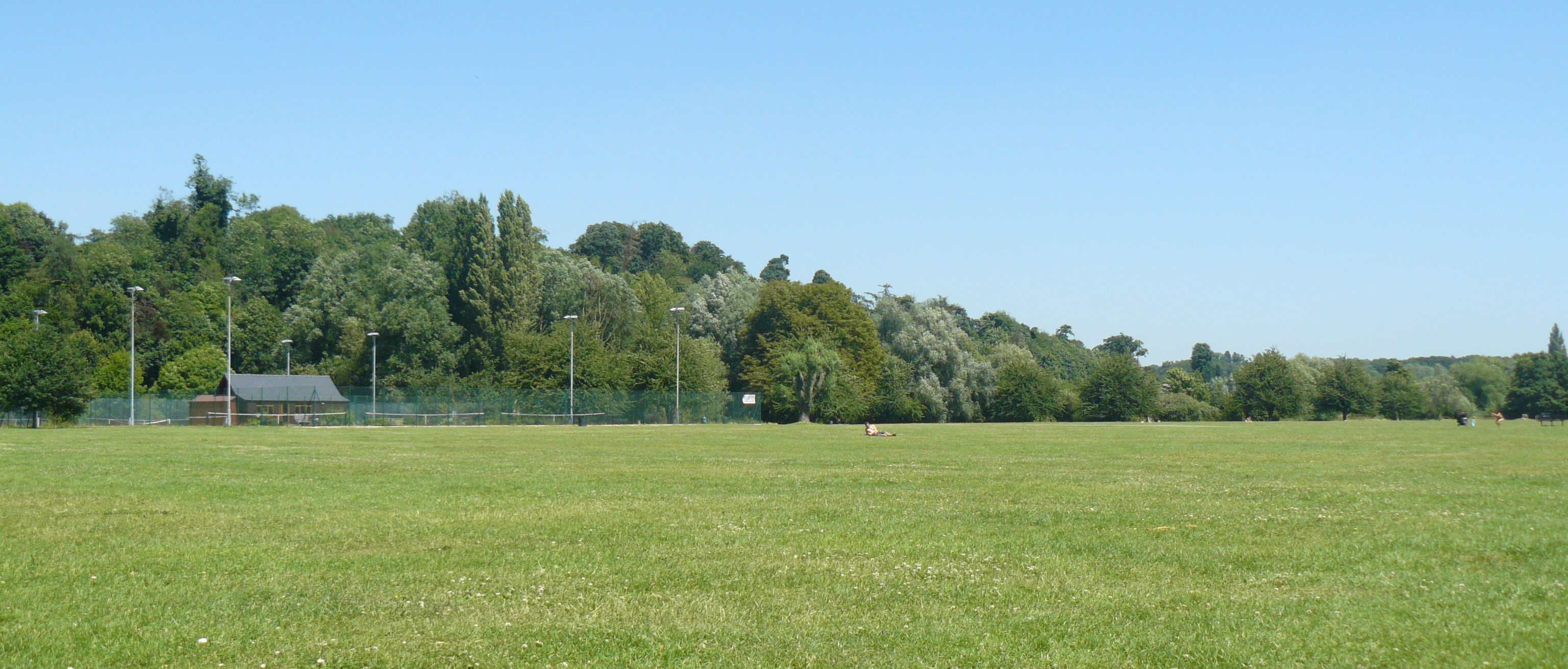
Hartham Common

== Economy ==
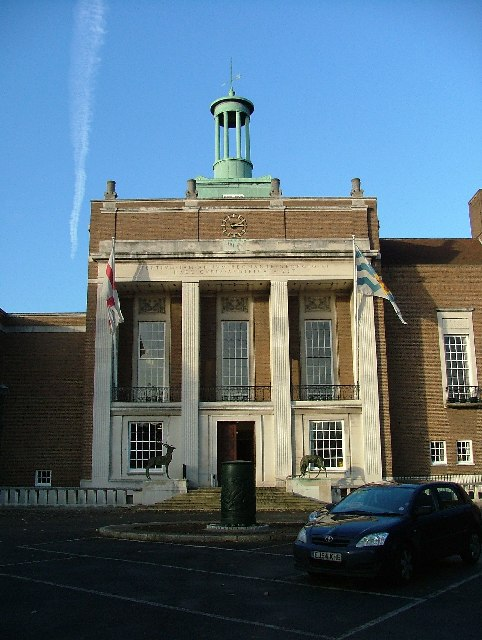
Hertfordshire County Hall in Hertford

A fair amount of employment in the town is centred on County Hall (Hertfordshire County Council), Wallfields (East Hertfordshire District Council) and McMullens Brewery, one of a dwindling number of independent pre-1970 family brewers in the United Kingdom. Many residents commute to work in London.

Hertford differs from neighbouring towns as it lacks a modern shopping development (mall). However, it has most of the usual supermarkets. A Tesco store occupies part of the former Christ's Hospital Bluecoat Girls School, which closed down in 1985. Sainsbury's opened a new store on part of the McMullens Brewery site in June 2012. A Waitrose occupied a reasonably large store in the Bircherley Green Shopping area that closed on 12 September 2017. The local branch of Woolworths closed for good on 27 December 2008, after the collapse of that store chain. There are fewer of the usual chain shops found in most high streets and this makes Hertford stand out from other "clone towns". There are a high number of independent shops in the town, with a variety of boutiques and salons.

== Sport and leisure ==
Hertford has a leisure centre and swimming pool, skatepark, bowling green and tennis courts on Hartham Common.

=== Football ===
The town has a Non-League football club, Hertford Town F.C., which plays at Hertingfordbury Park. Hertford Town Youth FC, a FA Charter Standard Football Club, plays at County Hall Playing Fields, situated next to the headquarters of Hertfordshire County Council at County Hall in Hertford. Other clubs in the surrounding area include Bury Rangers, Hertford Heath Youth FC and Bengeo Tigers Football Club (an award-winning FA Charter Standard Community Football Club.)

=== Cricket ===
Hertford Cricket Club is based in the town. Records for a Hertford club go back a far as 1825,. However, the club in its present form has been in existence since 1860. The club plays its matches at Balls park, Hertford. Currently the club runs five teams and all the teams play in the local league.

== Notable people ==
- Frederick Scott Archer (1813 – 1857), son of a Hertford butcher, was an early photographer best known for having invented the photographic collodion process
- The band Deep Purple formed in Hertford in 1968.
- Alfred Russel Wallace who proposed a theory of natural selection at the same time as Charles Darwin lived in Hertford from ages five to thirteen and attended Hertford Grammar School.
- John Wilkes, the radical politician, was educated in Hertford.
- Sergeant Alfred Alexander Burt, soldier in the Hertfordshire Regiment who was born and lived in Hertford. He was awarded the Victoria Cross for his valour on 27 September 1915 during the Battle of Loos.
- Captain W E Johns, Writer of the Biggles books was born in Bengeo, attended Hertford Grammar School and lived in Hertford.

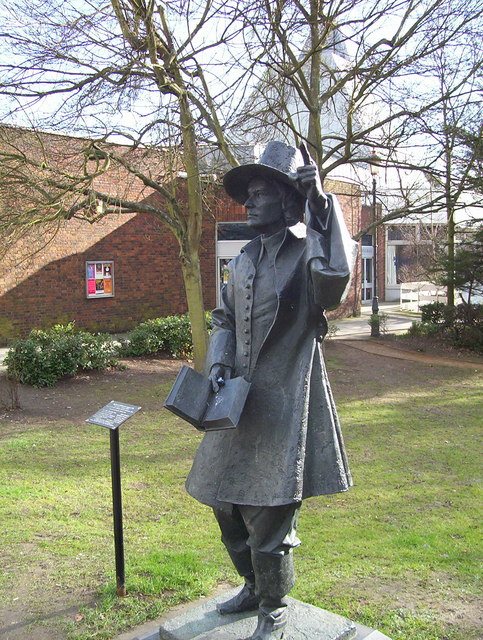
The statue of Samuel Stone

- Samuel Stone, Puritan minister who established the American town of Hartford, Connecticut with Thomas Hooker. He lived in Fore Street, Hertford and was baptised at All Saints Church. There is a statue commemorating him, close to the Hertford Theatre.
- Jane Wenham was tried at the Hertford Assizes for witchcraft in 1712. The jury found her guilty, one of the last in England to be convicted of this offence. Judge Powell had no choice but to condemn her to death, but through his influence she was later given a Royal Pardon.
- Jack Trevor Story, the author of "The Trouble with Harry" and other works, was born in Hertford in 1917.
- Television and radio reporter and presenter Tom Heap was born in Hertford.
- Actor Rupert Grint comes from Hertford, and although he now lives outside the town, he lived within Hertford when he began filming for the Harry Potter film series. He attended Richard Hale School until finishing his GCSE exams in 2004. Other famous former pupils of Richard Hale School are listed on the school's page.
- Dani Filth, singer of Cradle of Filth was born in Hertford, but grew up in Ipswich.
- Singer George Ezra was born and grew up in Hertford, attending Simon Balle School.
- International rugby union players Robbie Morris and Jamie George.
- Cricketers Stuart Cradock, John Hughes and Lawrence Wright were born in Hertford.
- The Labour Party MP for Liverpool Walton between 1964 and 1984, Labour Chairman, government minister and shadow cabinet minister Eric Heffer was born in Hertford in 1922

== Landmarks ==
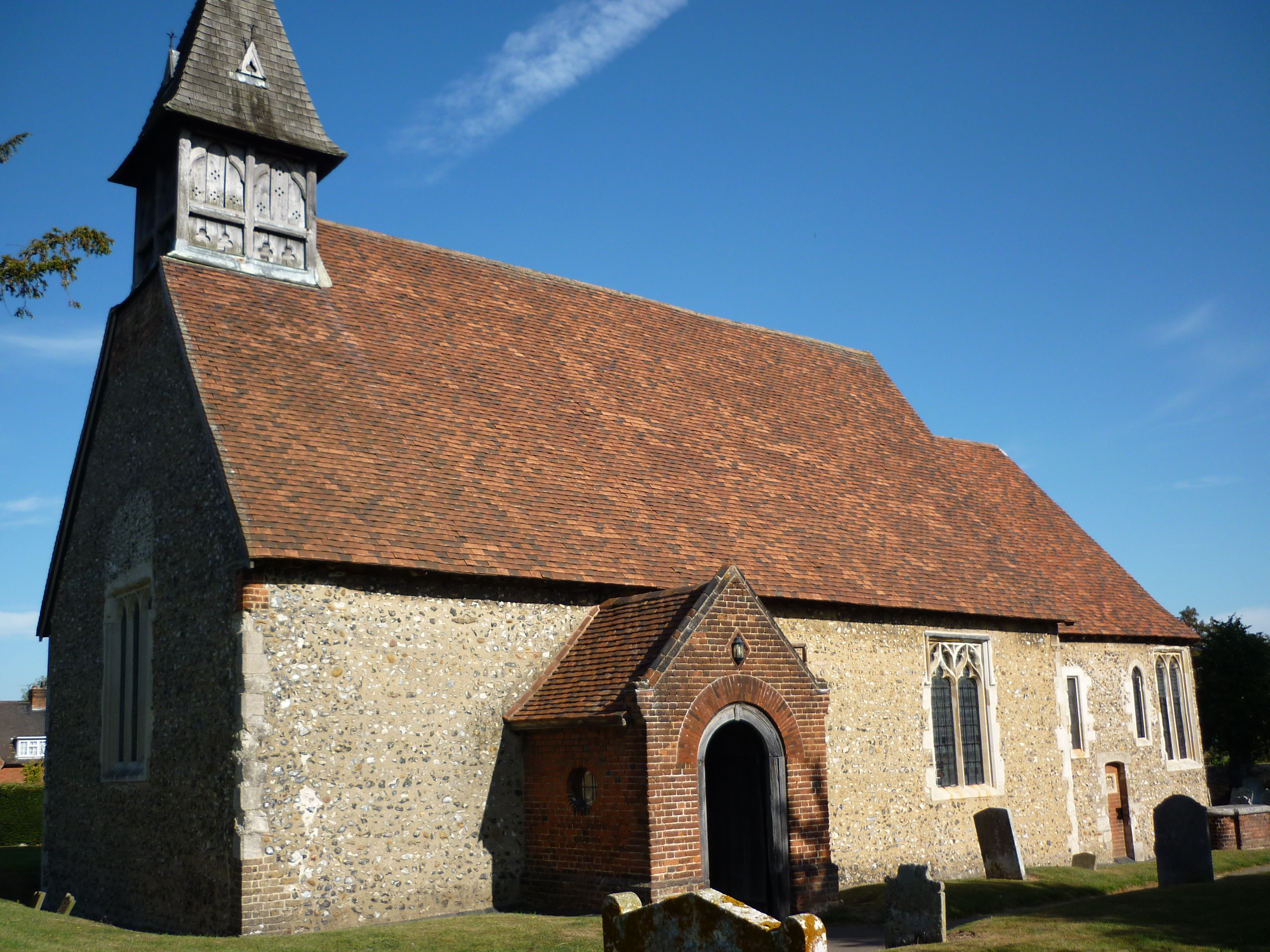
Church of Saint Leonard, Bengeo

- In the town are the remains of the original Hertford Castle, principally a motte. The castle's gatehouse, the central part of which dates to a rebuild by Edward IV in 1463, is the home to Hertford Town Council. The Motte, from the original Motte and Bailey castle in Hertford, can be found just behind Beam (formerly Castle Hall/Hertford Theatre), a short distance from the modern castle.
- There are several churches in the town. All Saints' and St Andrew's are late and mid 19th century respectively, although both stand on the sites of medieval places of worship. In the northern suburb of Bengeo lies St Leonard's, a two-celled Norman church of considerable architectural interest.
- In Railway Street can be found the oldest purpose-built Quaker Meeting House in the world, in use since 1670.

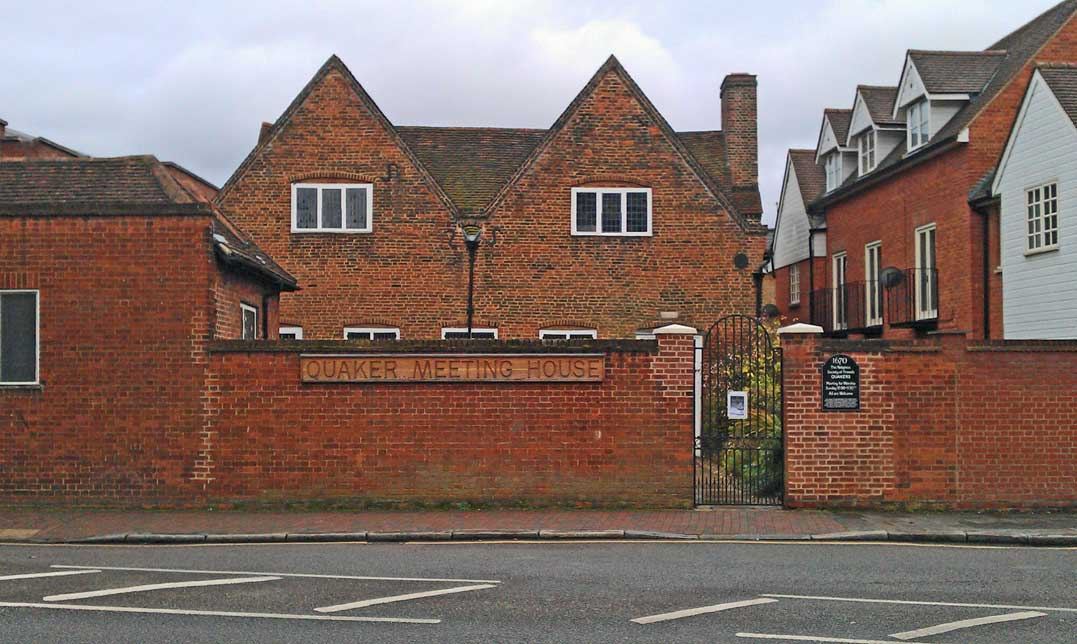
Hertford Quaker Meeting House

- The Parliament of England temporarily moved to Hertford during a plague outbreak in London in 1563. This is why the main square in the town, Parliament Square, is so named, although it is a twentieth-century creation.
- The home of Alfred Russel Wallace (see above), now named Wallace House, can be found at 11 St. Andrew St. and is marked with a plaque.
- Built in 1779, the Shire Hall was designed by Robert Adam. The ground floor houses Court Rooms.
- The Corn Exchange was built on the site of a former gaol. After years in the doldrums it is now a live entertainment venue.

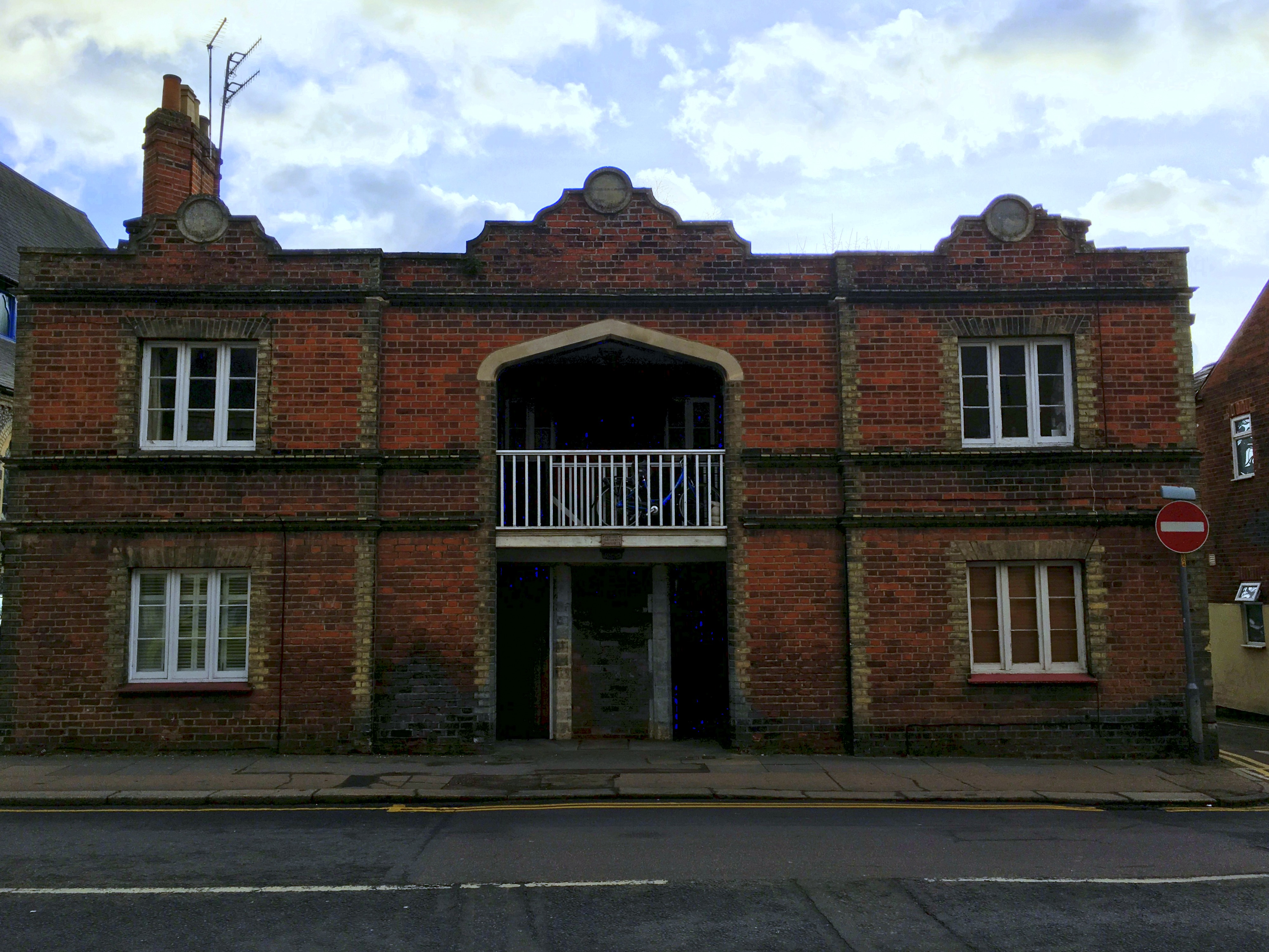
The Prince Albert Cottage

- The Egyptian House in Fore Street, built c. 1824, is an early example of Egyptian Revival architecture. It was a grocery store from the Victorian era until the 1960s, and is currently a restaurant.
- In Cowbridge, there is a Prince Albert Cottage. The first of these cottages was originally built in Hyde Park by the Society for Improving the Condition of the Labouring Classes in 1851 at the time of the Great Exhibition. Prince Albert was involved in their design and financing.
- Hertford Museum is housed in a 17th-century historic town house, with a Jacobean-style knot garden.
- A stained-glass window in St Andrew's Church is part of a fringe theory that links Hertford to the Knights Templar and the Holy Grail.

== Transport ==
=== Rail ===
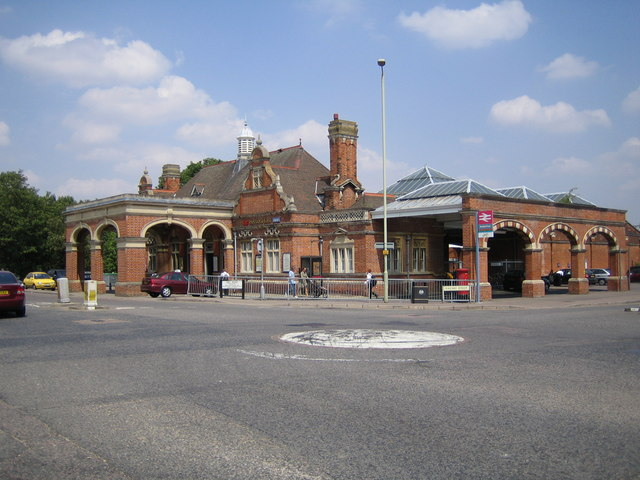
Hertford East railway station

Two railway stations serve Hertford - Hertford East and Hertford North. Transport for London Oyster cards are valid for payment and travel at both stations.

==== Hertford East ====
Hertford East is the northwestern terminus of the Hertford East Branch Line. Greater Anglia manages the station and operates trains between Hertford East and London Liverpool Street in the City of London.

The Hertford East Branch Line along with the West Anglia Main Line provide the town with direct connections to Ware, Broxbourne, Cheshunt, Waltham Cross, Tottenham Hale and Hackney Downs. At Broxbourne - the southeastern terminus of the branch line - the West Anglia Main Line runs northbound towards Bishop's Stortford, Audley End and Cambridge.

==== Hertford North ====
Hertford North is on the Hertford Loop Line, a branch of the East Coast Main Line.

Great Northern operates trains northbound towards Watton-at-Stone and Stevenage. Southbound, Great Northern trains run towards London Moorgate in the City through Enfield Chase, Alexandra Palace, Finsbury Park and Highbury and Islington. Some timetabled services run southbound into London King's Cross instead of Moorgate.

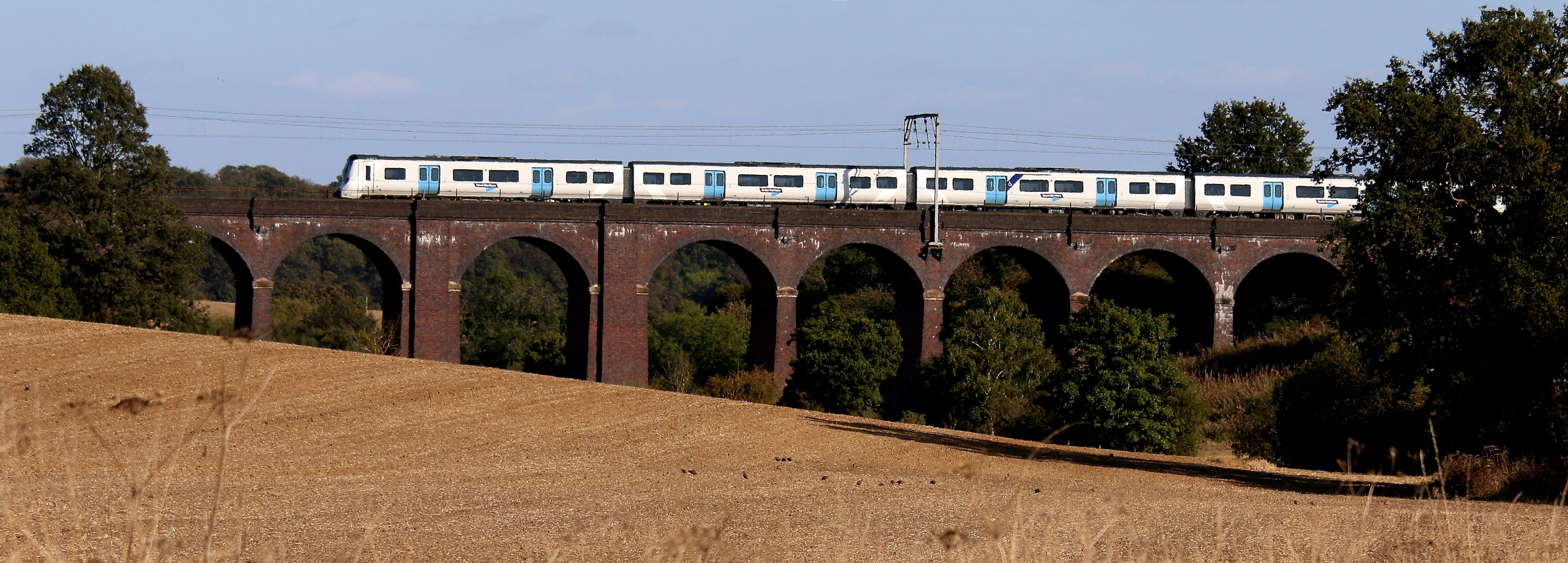
A Class 717 operated by Great Northern on the Northaw Viaduct, between Hertford North and London Moorgate

North of Stevenage, trains run towards Hitchin, Peterborough, the North and Scotland, and towards Letchworth, Royston and Cambridge. South of Finsbury Park, services run towards King's Cross, London St Pancras, Farringdon, Gatwick Airport and Brighton.

=== Road ===
The A10 runs north-south through the east of Hertford. Kingsmead Viaduct carries the A10 across the River Lea between Hertford and Ware. Southbound, the route runs towards the M25 London Orbital motorway and the City of London, through Cheshunt, Enfield and Tottenham. Northbound, the route runs towards King's Lynn in Norfolk via Buntingford, Royston, Cambridge and Ely.

The A414 runs east-west through Hertford, along Hertingfordbury Road, Gascoyne Way and London Road. The primary route runs eastbound towards the A10, Harlow, the M11 motorway, Chelmsford and Maldon. Westbound, the route carries traffic towards Hatfield, the A1(M) motorway, St Albans and Hemel Hempstead.

The A119 runs eastbound from Hertford into Ware. The route runs northbound from Hertford towards Watton-at-Stone and the A602 for Stevenage.

=== Bus and coach ===
Hertford Bus Station lies to the east of Bircherley Street in Hertford town centre.

Long-distance routes through Hertford include:

- 724 (Arriva Green Line) - Harlow (via Ware), or Heathrow Airport (via Welwyn Garden City, Hatfield, St Albans, Watford, Rickmansworth, Denham and Hillingdon)
- 737 (National Express) - Stansted Airport (via Harlow), or Oxford (via Hatfield, Luton Airport, Luton and Milton Keynes)

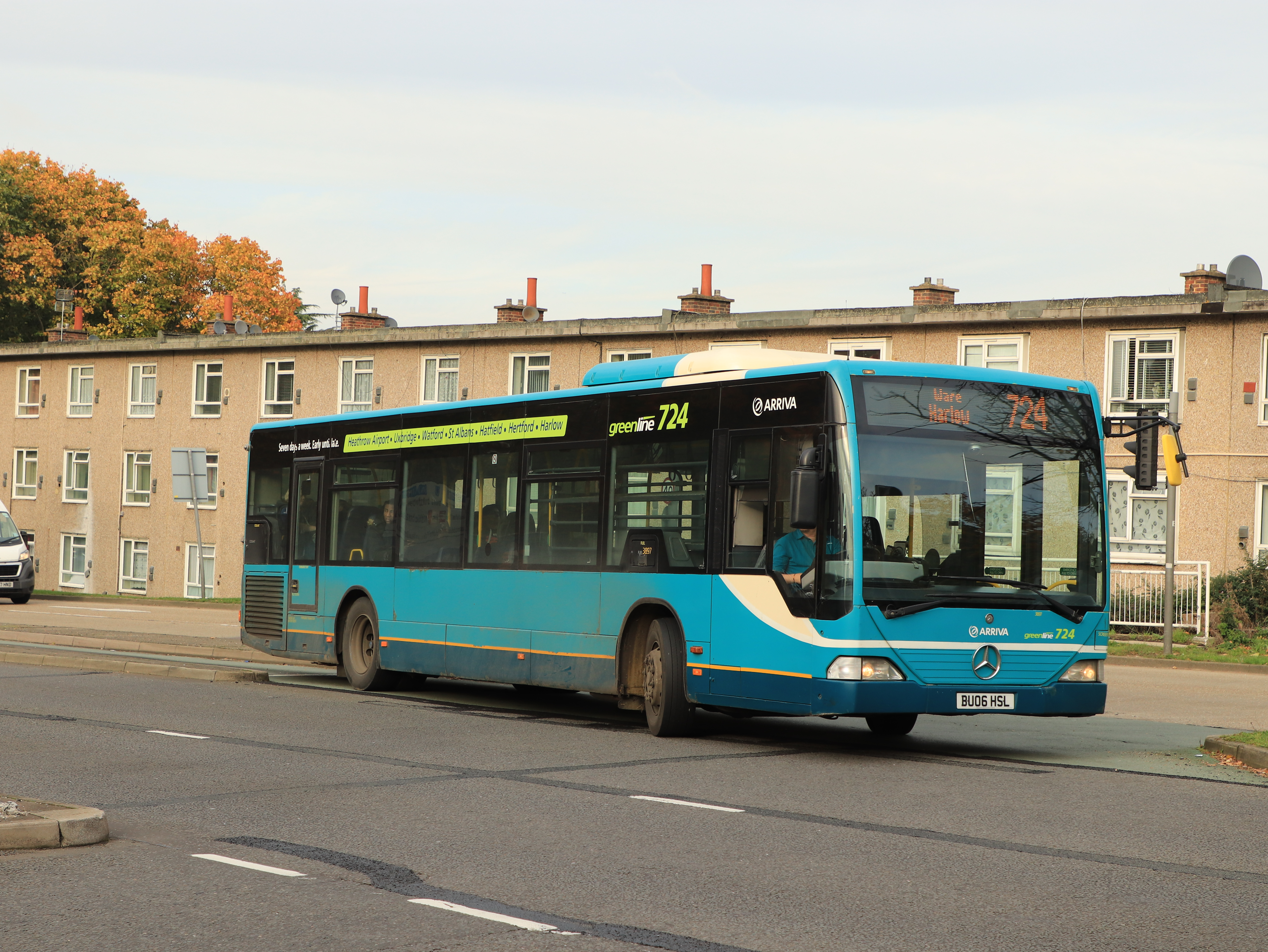
A 724-branded bus operated by Arriva Shires & Essex

Hertfordshire County Council manages the Intalink enhanced partnership which choreographs the local bus network. In January 2024, the local town network was connected into an integrated group of routes numbered H1-H6, operated by Vectare under the Central Connect brand.

Bus routes in Hertford include:

- 308/380 (Arriva) - Cuffley and Bayford
- 310 (Arriva) - Waltham Cross (via Ware, Broxbourne and Cheshunt)
- 323 (Arriva) - Haldens Estate (via Campfield Road, Great Gannett, & Welwyn Garden City
- 324 (Centrebus) - Ware, or Welwyn Garden City
- 331 (Arriva) - Royston (via Ware, Puckeridge and Buntingford)
- H6 (Central Connect) - Bengeo circular
- 341/641 (Uno) - Broxbourne (via Ware and Hoddesdon), or Hatfield (via Essendon)
- 35 (Central Connect) - Bishop's Stortford (via Much Hadham)
- 378/379 (Arriva) - Stevenage (via Tewin and Datchworth)
- 38/38A (Central Connect) - Stevenage (via Tonwell), or Ware
- 390 (Arriva/Centrebus) - Stevenage, or Ware
- 395 (Arriva) - Ware
- 907 (Centrebus) - Cheshunt or Stevenage via Hoddesdon, Ware,

=== Cycling ===
National Cycle Route 61 runs east-west through Hertford. Between Welwyn Garden City and Ware, through Hertford, the route is also known as Cole Green Way. The route's western terminus is near Taplow in Berkshire, near Slough and Maidenhead. To the east, NCR61 meets NCR1 near Hoddesdon.

Hertford is the northern terminus of the Lee Navigation and the associated towpath, which carries NCR61 for part of its route. The towpath's southern terminus is in Limehouse, East London. The cycle route passes through Ware, Hoddesdon, Broxbourne, Enfield Lock, Tottenham, Leyton and Hackney Wick.

=== River ===
Hertford is the northern terminus of the navigable River Lea, which is managed by the Canal and River Trust. Southbound, the river runs towards Bromley-by-Bow in East London, through Ware, Hoddesdon, Broxbourne, Enfield Lock, Tottenham, Leyton and Hackney Wick. The river meets the navigable River Stort at Hoddesdon, which runs northbound through Harlow, Sawbridgeworth and Bishop's Stortford.

The Hertford Union Canal and the Limehouse Cut connect the Lee Navigation with the Regent's Canal in London.

Lee and Stort Boat Company runs a waterbus at various points throughout the year, with a route between Hertford and Ware.

== Education ==
Secondary schools in Hertford include the Sele School, Richard Hale School and Simon Balle All-through School (which also includes primary provision; other primary schools include Hollybush JMI, Millmead Community School, Bengeo Primary School, Morgans Primary School and Nursery, Abel Smith School (named after banker and MP Abel Smith (1788–1859)), St Andrew's School, St. Josephs RC School and Wheatcroft School.

Private schools include Hertford Prep, previously known as St. Joseph's in the Park in Hertingfordbury, Duncombe School, (a preparatory school in Bengeo) and Haileybury College in Hertford Heath.

Pinewood and Middleton Schools are special needs schools that are available in neighbouring Ware.

Former schools include The Pines JMI School, which was built on the Pinehurst estate in 1977 and closed in 2003.

== Media ==
Hertford is within the BBC London and ITV London region. Television signals are received from the Crystal Palace TV transmitter and the local relay transmitter. Local radio stations are BBC Three Counties Radio on 90.4 FM and Heart Hertfordshire on 106.9 FM. Hertford's local newspaper is the Hertfordshire Mercury.

== Entertainment ==
BEAM Hertford, previously known as Hertford Theatre and Castle Hall, is a modern, multi purpose theatre, cinema and venue complex on The Wash in the town centre. .

The Hertford Corn Exchange is a building where entertainment such as comedy and art exhibitions take place. Hertford has many food, drink and entertainment establishments which have grown in number considerably since the eighties and nineties. It attracts people from nearby towns, and often the North London suburbs. There are approximately 25 pubs and clubs in the area, and around 35 restaurants, takeaways and snack bars. Hertford also benefits from public swimming pool and gym facilities and a small skatepark, all situated on Hartham Common.

== Town twinning ==
Hertford is twinned with:

- Évron, France
- Wildeshausen, Germany
- Hartford, Connecticut, United States
