= Lawrence Wright (cricketer) =

English cricket

Lawrence Wright (born 11 May 1940) is a former English cricketer. He was a right-handed batsman who played for Hertfordshire. He was born in Hertford.

Wright, who represented the team in the Minor Counties Championship between 1960 and 1972, made a single List A appearance for the team, during the 1964 Gillette Cup. From the middle order, he scored 7 runs.
