= Horns Mill Weir =

Weir on the River Lea in Hertfordshire, England

Coordinates: 51.787037°N 0.086657°W

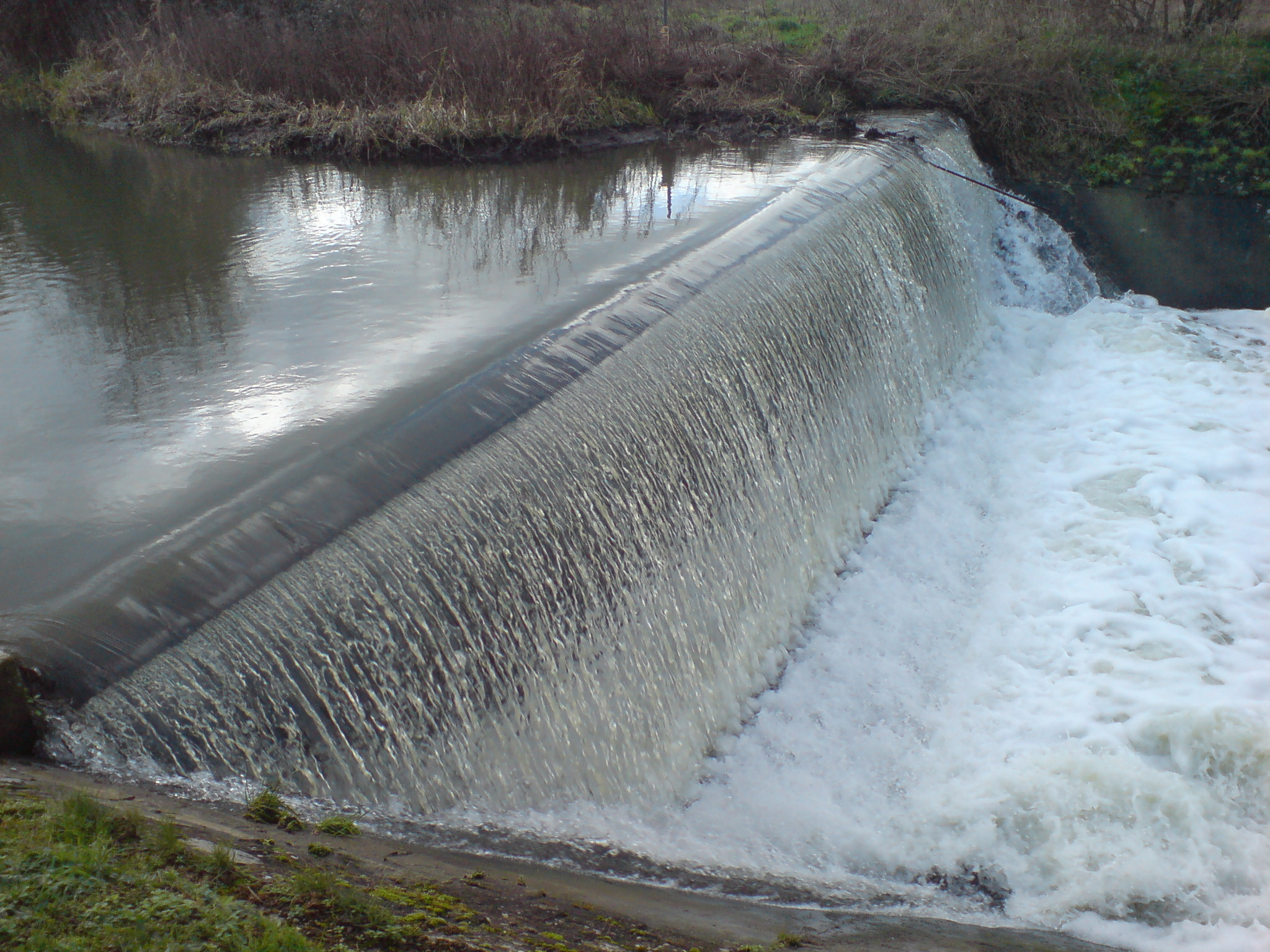
Horns Mill Weir in high flows

Horns Mill Weir is a weir on the River Lea, next to Horns Mill, Hertford.
