= Larry Bud Wright =

American football coach

Larry "Bud" Wright (born December 13, 1940) is the former head coach of Indiana's Sheridan High School Blackhawks football team. He is the winningest coach in Indiana high school football history, with 457 wins as of the 2024 season. He has coached the Blackhawks for 59 seasons and has coached for 60 seasons overall.

== History ==
Wright was born December 13, 1940, in Frankfort, Indiana, and is a 1963 Graduate of Ball State University. In his 58 years at Sheridan High through the 2023 season, he had a record of 456–210, including nine Indiana High School state championships. His nine titles are tied for first all-time in Indiana among coaches. Wright led Sheridan to the Class A title in 1980, 1984, 1987, 1988, 1992, 1998, 2005, 2006, and 2007. He has also led the Blackhawks to 10 semi-state, 14 regional, and 19 sectional championships. He was inducted into the Indiana High School Football Coaches Hall of Fame on September 28, 2002.

== State championship scores ==
- November 14, 1980 - Sheridan 27, North Judson 9
- November 23, 1984 - Sheridan 19, North Judson 10
- November 17, 1987 - Sheridan 10, Jimtown 0
- November 25, 1988 - Sheridan 59, Bremen 0
- November 27, 1992 - Sheridan 6, Cardinal Ritter 0
- November 27, 1998 - Sheridan 56, North White 33
- November 25, 2005 - Sheridan 21, Knightstown 7
- November 24, 2006 - Sheridan 34, Cardinal Ritter 28 - OT
- November 23, 2007 - Sheridan 34, Rockville 28

== Records ==
Wright's teams and players from Sheridan High School hold multiple Indiana High School Athletic Association records.

=== State of Indiana individual records ===
- Scoring in a single season: Brett Law: 1988 (453 points)
- Scoring in a career: Brett Law: 1986–1989 (952 points)

=== State of Indiana Class A championship game team records ===
- Points scored (tied) - Sheridan vs. Bremen, 1988 (59 points)
- Margin of victory - Sheridan vs. Bremen, 1988 (59–0)
- Rushing yards - Sheridan vs. Bremen, 1988 (451 rushing yards)
- Rushing touchdowns (tied) - Sheridan vs. North White, 1998 (7 rushing touchdowns)
- Fewest yards allowed - Sheridan vs. Bremen, 1988 (36 yards)
- Fewest first downs allowed (tied) - Sheridan vs. Bremen, 1988 (2 first downs)

=== State of Indiana Class A championship game individual records ===
- Points scored - Brett Law - Sheridan vs. Bremen, 1988 (34 points)
- Rushing touchdowns (tied) - Brett Law - Sheridan vs. Bremen, 1988 (5 rushing touchdowns)
- Rushing yards - Brett Law - Sheridan vs. Bremen, 1988 (301 rushing yards)
