= Two-tier local government in England =

Following the Local Government Act 1972, a standardised two-tier system of local government was introduced across England in 1974, with an upper level of county councils classified as metropolitan counties and non-metropolitan counties, and a lower level of metropolitan districts and non-metropolitan districts governed by district councils. It followed a similar two-tier system being introduced solely in Greater London in the London Government Act 1963, which introduced the upper-level Greater London Council and lower-level London boroughs in 1965.

Over time, the two-tier system has been replaced with a simplified single-tier system of unitary authorities, which combine the roles previously held separately by county councils and district councils. This process started with the Local Government Act 1985 which abolished the Greater London Council and metropolitan county councils in 1986. The two-tier structure in the rest of England was abolished gradually over time, firstly in the 1990s following the Local Government Act 1992, and subsequently in reforms in 2009 and 2019–23. The final remaining two-tier local authorities are scheduled to be abolished and replaced with unitary authorities by 2028, as part of the upcoming structural changes to local government in England.

== Function comparison ==
In two-tier areas, local government functions are divided between county and district councils, to the level where they can be practised most efficiently:

- Borough/district councils are responsible for local planning and building control, council housing, environmental health, markets and fairs, refuse collection and recycling, cemeteries and crematoria, leisure services, parks, and tourism.
- County councils are responsible for running the largest and most expensive local services such as education, social services, libraries, main roads, public transport, fire services, Trading Standards, waste disposal and strategic planning.

Service	Two-tier		Unitary authority
Service	Non-metropolitan county	Non-metropolitan district	Unitary authority
Education	Yes	No	Yes
Transport	Yes	No	Yes
Housing	No	Yes	Yes
Planning	Yes (Note: Planning authority for minerals, waste and county council developments)	Yes	Yes
Planning applications	No	Yes	Yes
Fire and public safety	Yes	No	Yes
Social care	Yes	No	Yes
Libraries	Yes	No	Yes
Waste management	Yes	No	Yes
Rubbish collection	No	Yes	Yes
Recycling	No	Yes	Yes
Trading standards	Yes	No	Yes
Council Tax collections	No	Yes	Yes

== List of two-tier districts and counties over time ==
English local authority districts by year of restructuring from two-tier governance into unitary authorities: 1986; 1995–1998: 1995 1996 1997 1998; 2009; 2019–2023: 2019 2020 2021 2023; 2027+: 2027 Paused or withdrawn Not yet announced

The following table shows the progression of the structure of local government in England from the introduction of two-tier local government in 1974 to its planned phasing out in 2028 after the upcoming structural changes to local government in England, after which every district of England is expected to be a unitary authority with no remaining two-tier county councils. The table shows both newly created and abolished districts, and renamed districts.

Under section 74 of the Local Government Act 1972, the council of a district, county or London borough (or county borough in Wales) may change its name, providing the resolution to do so gains two-thirds of the votes at a special meeting. Until 1 April 1978, the council had to have the permission of the Secretary of State, but since that date they may do so unilaterally. At least one district name change was vetoed: the shadow authority for North Wolds wished to become "Bridlington and Yorkshire Wolds" before 1974 at the same time as other name changes were allowed. Several English districts have done this, whilst others have been renamed under the 1990s United Kingdom local government reform. A few districts have changed names twice.

Districts in green are unitary authorities.

Two-tier county							District							Became unitary (date)
1974	1988	1998	2009	2019	2023	2028	1974	1988	1998	2009	2019	2023	2028	Became unitary (date)
Avon (NM)		–					Bristol (NM, City)							1 April 1996
Avon (NM)		–					Woodspring (NM)		North Somerset					1 April 1996
Avon (NM)		–					Bath (NM, City)		Bath and North East Somerset					1 April 1996
Avon (NM)		–					Wansdyke (NM)		Bath and North East Somerset					1 April 1996
Avon (NM)		–					Kingswood (NM)		South Gloucestershire					1 April 1996
Avon (NM)		–					Northavon (NM)		South Gloucestershire					1 April 1996
Bedfordshire (NM)			–				Bedford (B, NM)	North Bedfordshire (Note: Renamed 15 October 1975)	Bedford (Note: Renamed 1 October 1992)					1 April 2009
Bedfordshire (NM)			–				Mid Bedfordshire (NM)			Central Bedfordshire				1 April 2009
Bedfordshire (NM)			–				South Bedfordshire (NM)			Central Bedfordshire				1 April 2009
		–					Luton (B, NM)							1 April 1997
Berkshire (Note: County's existence not officially abolished, but ceased to be used in government) (NM, R)		–					Bracknell (B, NM)	Bracknell Forest (Note: Renamed on 27 April 1988)						1 April 1998
Berkshire (NM, R)		–					Reading (B, NM)							1 April 1998
Berkshire (NM, R)		–					Slough (B, NM)							1 April 1998
Berkshire (NM, R)		–					Windsor and Maidenhead (B, NM, R)							1 April 1998
Berkshire (NM, R)		–					Wokingham (B, NM)							1 April 1998
Berkshire (NM, R)		–					Newbury (B, NM)		West Berkshire (Note: Renamed and became unitary 1 April 1998)				Ridgeway (Note: Excluding some areas from South Oxfordshire and Vale of White Horse)	1 April 1998
Oxfordshire (NM)						–	South Oxfordshire (Note: Initially named "Wallingford" in legislation; renamed on 20 September 1973 by shadow authority before coming into force.) (NM)						Ridgeway	1 April 2028
Oxfordshire (NM)						–	Vale of White Horse (NM)						Ridgeway	1 April 2028
Oxfordshire (NM)						–	Oxford (NM, City)						Greater Oxford (Note: Including some areas from Cherwell, South Oxfordshire, Vale of White Horse.)	1 April 2028
Oxfordshire (NM)						–	Cherwell (NM)						North Oxfordshire (Note: Excluding some areas from Cherwell.)	1 April 2028
Oxfordshire (NM)						–	West Oxfordshire (NM)						North Oxfordshire	1 April 2028
Buckinghamshire (NM)					–		Aylesbury Vale (NM)					Buckinghamshire		1 April 2020
Buckinghamshire (NM)					–		Chiltern (NM)					Buckinghamshire		1 April 2020
Buckinghamshire (NM)					–		Beaconsfield (NM)	South Bucks (Note: Renamed to "South Bucks" on 1 April 1980)				Buckinghamshire		1 April 2020
Buckinghamshire (NM)					–		Wycombe (NM)					Buckinghamshire		1 April 2020
		–					Milton Keynes (NM, City (2022))							1 April 1997
Cambridgeshire (NM)						–	Cambridge (NM, City)						TBD	1 April 2028
Cambridgeshire (NM)						–	South Cambridgeshire (NM)						TBD	1 April 2028
Cambridgeshire (NM)						–	East Cambridgeshire (NM)						TBD	1 April 2028
Cambridgeshire (NM)						–	Fenland (NM)						TBD	1 April 2028
Cambridgeshire (NM)						–	Huntingdon (NM)	Huntingdonshire (Note: Renamed on 1 October 1984)					TBD	1 April 2028
		–					Peterborough (NM, City)						TBD	1 April 1997
1974	1988	1998	2009	2019	2023	2028	1974	1988	1998	2009	2019	2023	2028	
Cheshire (NM)				–			Chester (NM, City)			Cheshire West and Chester				1 April 2009
Cheshire (NM)				–			Ellesmere Port (B, NM)	Ellesmere Port and Neston (Note: Renamed 21 June 1976)		Cheshire West and Chester				1 April 2009
Cheshire (NM)				–			Vale Royal (B, NM)			Cheshire West and Chester				1 April 2009
Cheshire (NM)				–			Congleton (B, NM)			Cheshire East				1 April 2009
Cheshire (NM)				–			Crewe and Nantwich (Note: Initially named "Crewe" in legislation; renamed on 17 January 1974 by shadow authority before coming into force.) (B, NM)			Cheshire East				1 April 2009
Cheshire (NM)				–			Macclesfield (B, NM)			Cheshire East				1 April 2009
		–					Halton (B, NM)							1 April 1998
		–					Warrington (B, NM)							1 April 1998
Cleveland (NM)		–					Hartlepool (B, NM)							1 April 1996
Cleveland (NM)		–					Middlesbrough (B, NM)							1 April 1996
Cleveland (NM)		–					Langbaurgh (B, NM)	Langbaurgh-on-Tees (Note: Renamed 1 January 1988)	Redcar and Cleveland (Note: Renamed and became unitary on 1 April 1996)					1 April 1996
Cleveland (NM)		–					Stockton-on-Tees (B, NM)							1 April 1996
Cornwall (NM)			–				Caradon (NM)			Cornwall				1 April 2009
Cornwall (NM)			–				Carrick (NM)			Cornwall				1 April 2009
Cornwall (NM)			–				Kerrier (NM)			Cornwall				1 April 2009
Cornwall (NM)			–				North Cornwall (NM)			Cornwall				1 April 2009
Cornwall (NM)			–				Penwith (NM)			Cornwall				1 April 2009
Cornwall (NM)			–				Restormel (B, NM)			Cornwall				1 April 2009
–							Isles of Scilly (Sui generis)							1890
County Durham (NM)			–				Chester-le-Street (NM)			County Durham				1 April 2009
County Durham (NM)			–				Derwentside (NM)			County Durham				1 April 2009
County Durham (NM)			–				Durham (NM, City)			County Durham				1 April 2009
County Durham (NM)			–				Easington (NM)			County Durham				1 April 2009
County Durham (NM)			–				Sedgefield (B, NM)			County Durham				1 April 2009
County Durham (NM)			–				Teesdale (NM)			County Durham				1 April 2009
County Durham (NM)			–				Wear Valley (NM)			County Durham				1 April 2009
		–					Darlington (NM)							1 April 1997
Cumbria (NM)					–		Allerdale (B, NM)					Cumberland		1 April 2023
Cumbria (NM)					–		Carlisle (NM, City)					Cumberland		1 April 2023
Cumbria (NM)					–		Copeland (B, NM)					Cumberland		1 April 2023
Cumbria (NM)					–		Barrow-in-Furness (B, NM)					Westmorland and Furness		1 April 2023
Cumbria (NM)					–		Eden (NM)					Westmorland and Furness		1 April 2023
Cumbria (NM)					–		South Lakeland (NM)					Westmorland and Furness		1 April 2023
1974	1988	1998	2009	2019	2023	2028	1974	1988	1998	2009	2019	2023	2028	
Derbyshire (NM)						–	Bolsover (NM)						Derbyshire North (Note: Including some areas from Amber Valley)	1 April 2028
Derbyshire (NM)						–	Chesterfield (B, NM)						Derbyshire North	1 April 2028
Derbyshire (NM)						–	Derbyshire Dales (NM)						Derbyshire North	1 April 2028
Derbyshire (NM)						–	High Peak (B, NM)						Derbyshire North	1 April 2028
Derbyshire (NM)						–	North East Derbyshire (NM)						Derbyshire North	1 April 2028
Derbyshire (NM)						–	Amber Valley (B, NM)						Derbyshire South (Note: Excluding some areas from Amber Valley)	1 April 2028
Derbyshire (NM)						–	Erewash (B, NM)						Derbyshire South	1 April 2028
Derbyshire (NM)						–	South Derbyshire (NM)						Derbyshire South	1 April 2028
		–					Derby (NM, City)						Derbyshire South	1 April 1997
Devon (NM)						–	Exeter (Note: Expanding to include areas from East Devon, Mid Devon and Teignbridge from 2028) (NM, City)							1 April 2028
Devon (NM)						–	East Devon (NM)						Devon (Note: Excluding some areas from East Devon, Mid Devon, South Hams and Teignbridge)	1 April 2028
Devon (NM)						–	Tiverton (NM)	Mid Devon (Note: Renamed 6 February 1978)					Devon	1 April 2028
Devon (NM)						–	North Devon (NM)						Devon	1 April 2028
Devon (NM)						–	South Hams (NM)						Devon	1 April 2028
Devon (NM)						–	Teignbridge (NM)						Devon	1 April 2028
Devon (NM)						–	Torridge (NM)						Devon	1 April 2028
Devon (NM)						–	West Devon (B, NM)						Devon	1 April 2028
		–					Plymouth (NM, City)						Greater Plymouth (Note: Expanding to include areas from South Hams in 2028)	1 April 1998
		–					Torbay (Note: Expanding to include areas from South Hams and Teignbridge in 2028) (B, NM)						Torbay and South Devon	1 April 1998
Dorset (NM)					–		Wimborne (NM)	East Dorset (Note: Renamed 1 January 1988)			Dorset			1 April 2019
Dorset (NM)					–		North Dorset (NM)				Dorset			1 April 2019
Dorset (NM)					–		Purbeck (NM)				Dorset			1 April 2019
Dorset (NM)					–		West Dorset (NM)				Dorset			1 April 2019
Dorset (NM)					–		Weymouth and Portland (B, NM)				Dorset			1 April 2019
Dorset (NM)					–		Christchurch (B, NM)				Bournemouth, Christchurch and Poole			1 April 2019
		–					Bournemouth (B, NM)				Bournemouth, Christchurch and Poole			1 April 1997
		–					Poole (B, NM)				Bournemouth, Christchurch and Poole			1 April 1997
1974	1988	1998	2009	2019	2023	2028	1974	1988	1998	2009	2019	2023	2028	
East Sussex (NM)						–	Eastbourne (B, NM)						East Sussex (Note: Excluding some areas from Lewes)	1 April 2028
East Sussex (NM)						–	Hastings (NM)						East Sussex	1 April 2028
East Sussex (NM)						–	Lewes (NM)						East Sussex	1 April 2028
East Sussex (NM)						–	Rother (NM)						East Sussex	1 April 2028
East Sussex (NM)						–	Wealden (NM)						East Sussex	1 April 2028
		–					Brighton (B, NM)		Brighton and Hove (City (2001))					1 April 1997 (Note: Expanding to include some areas from Lewes in 2028)
		–					Hove (B, NM)		Brighton and Hove (City (2001))					1 April 1997
		–					Thurrock (B, NM)						South West Essex	1 April 1998
Essex (NM)						–	Basildon (B, NM)						South West Essex	1 April 2028
Essex (NM)						–	Braintree (NM)						North East Essex	1 April 2028
Essex (NM)						–	Colchester (B, NM)						North East Essex	1 April 2028
Essex (NM)						–	Tendring (NM)						North East Essex	1 April 2028
Essex (NM)						–	Brentwood (B, NM)						Mid Essex	1 April 2028
Essex (NM)						–	Chelmsford (NM, City (2012))						Mid Essex	1 April 2028
Essex (NM)						–	Maldon (NM)						Mid Essex	1 April 2028
Essex (NM)						–	Epping Forest (NM)						West Essex	1 April 2028
Essex (NM)						–	Harlow (NM)						West Essex	1 April 2028
Essex (NM)						–	Uttlesford (NM)						West Essex	1 April 2028
Essex (NM)						–	Castle Point (B, NM)						South East Essex	1 April 2028
Essex (NM)						–	Rochford (NM)						South East Essex	1 April 2028
		–					Southend-on-Sea (B, NM, City (2022))						South East Essex	1 April 1998
Gloucestershire (NM)						–	Cheltenham (B, NM)						Gloucestershire	1 April 2028
Gloucestershire (NM)						–	Cotswold (NM)						Gloucestershire	1 April 2028
Gloucestershire (NM)						–	Forest of Dean (NM)						Gloucestershire	1 April 2028
Gloucestershire (NM)						–	Gloucester (NM, City)						Gloucestershire	1 April 2028
Gloucestershire (NM)						–	Stroud (NM)						Gloucestershire	1 April 2028
Gloucestershire (NM)						–	Tewkesbury (B, NM)						Gloucestershire	1 April 2028
1974	1988	1998	2009	2019	2023	2028	1974	1988	1998	2009	2019	2023	2028	
Greater London (Note: County's existence not officially abolished, but ceased to be used in government. Later revived for unrelated use in regional devolved government.) (Note: The twelve boroughs of inner London and the City of London continued to have their areas' education responsibilities filled by the Inner London Education Authority until 1990.)	–						Barking (Note: Renamed 1 January 1980) (LB)	Barking and Dagenham						1 April 1986
Greater London	–						Barnet (LB)							1 April 1986
Greater London	–						Bexley (LB)							1 April 1986
Greater London	–						Brent (LB)							1 April 1986
Greater London	–						Bromley (LB)							1 April 1986
Greater London	–						Camden (LB)							1 April 1986
Greater London	–						Croydon (LB)							1 April 1986
Greater London	–						Ealing (LB)							1 April 1986
Greater London	–						Enfield (LB)							1 April 1986
Greater London	–						Greenwich (LB, R)							1 April 1986
Greater London	–						Hackney (LB)							1 April 1986
Greater London	–						Hammersmith (Note: Renamed to "Hammersmith and Fulham" on 1 April 1979) (LB)	Hammersmith and Fulham						1 April 1986
Greater London	–						Haringey (LB)							1 April 1986
Greater London	–						Harrow (LB)							1 April 1986
Greater London	–						Havering (LB)							1 April 1986
Greater London	–						Hillingdon (LB)							1 April 1986
Greater London	–						Hounslow (LB)							1 April 1986
Greater London	–						Islington (LB)							1 April 1986
Greater London	–						Kensington and Chelsea (LB, R)							1 April 1986
Greater London	–						Kingston upon Thames (LB, R)							1 April 1986
Greater London	–						Lambeth (LB)							1 April 1986
Greater London	–						Lewisham (LB)							1 April 1986
Greater London	–						City of London (City, Sui generis)							1 April 1986
Greater London	–						Merton (LB)							1 April 1986
Greater London	–						Newham (LB)							1 April 1986
Greater London	–						Redbridge (LB)							1 April 1986
Greater London	–						Richmond upon Thames (LB)							1 April 1986
Greater London	–						Southwark (LB)							1 April 1986
Greater London	–						Sutton (LB)							1 April 1986
Greater London	–						Tower Hamlets (LB)							1 April 1986
Greater London	–						Waltham Forest (LB)							1 April 1986
Greater London	–						Wandsworth (LB)							1 April 1986
Greater London	–						Westminster (LB, City)							1 April 1986
1974	1988	1998	2009	2019	2023	2028	1974	1988	1998	2009	2019	2023	2028	
Greater Manchester (M)	–						Bolton (B, M)							1 April 1986
Greater Manchester (M)	–						Bury (B, M)							1 April 1986
Greater Manchester (M)	–						Manchester (M, City)							1 April 1986
Greater Manchester (M)	–						Oldham (B, M)							1 April 1986
Greater Manchester (M)	–						Rochdale (B, M)							1 April 1986
Greater Manchester (M)	–						Salford (M, City)							1 April 1986
Greater Manchester (M)	–						Stockport (B, M)							1 April 1986
Greater Manchester (M)	–						Tameside (B, M)							1 April 1986
Greater Manchester (M)	–						Trafford (B, M)							1 April 1986
Greater Manchester (M)	–						Wigan (B, M)							1 April 1986
		–					Southampton (NM, City)						South West Hampshire (Note: Also including some areas from New Forest and Test Valley.)	1 April 1997
Hampshire (NM)						–	Eastleigh (B, NM)						South West Hampshire	1 April 2028
Hampshire (NM)						–	Basingstoke (Note: Renamed to "Basingstoke and Deane" on 20 January 1978) (B, NM)	Basingstoke and Deane					North Hampshire	1 April 2028
Hampshire (NM)						–	Hart (NM)						North Hampshire	1 April 2028
Hampshire (NM)						–	Rushmoor (B, NM)						North Hampshire	1 April 2028
Hampshire (NM)						–	East Hampshire (Note: Initially named "Petersfield" in legislation; renamed on 8 October 1973 by shadow authority before coming into force.) (NM)						Mid Hampshire (Note: Excluding some areas from East Hampshire, Winchester, New Forest, and Test Valley)	1 April 2028
Hampshire (NM)						–	New Forest (B, NM)						Mid Hampshire	1 April 2028
Hampshire (NM)						–	Test Valley (B, NM)						Mid Hampshire	1 April 2028
Hampshire (NM)						–	Winchester (NM, City)						Mid Hampshire	1 April 2028
Hampshire (NM)						–	Fareham (B, NM)						South East Hampshire (Note: Also including areas from East Hampshire and Winchester.)	1 April 2028
Hampshire (NM)						–	Gosport (B, NM)						South East Hampshire	1 April 2028
Hampshire (NM)						–	Havant (B, NM)						South East Hampshire	1 April 2028
		–					Portsmouth (NM, City)						South East Hampshire	1 April 1997
Hereford and Worcester (NM)		–					Hereford (NM, City)		Herefordshire					1 April 1998
Hereford and Worcester (NM)		–					Leominster (Note: Part transferred to Malvern Hills district in 1998) (NM)		Herefordshire					1 April 1998
Hereford and Worcester (NM)		–					South Herefordshire (NM)		Herefordshire					1 April 1998
Hereford and Worcester (NM)		Worcestershire (NM)				–	Malvern Hills (NM)		Malvern Hills (Note: The core of the previous Malvern Hills district, plus some areas from Leominster district, and minus some areas transferred to Herefordshire) (NM)				South Worcestershire	1 April 2028
Hereford and Worcester (NM)		Worcestershire (NM)				–	Worcester (NM, City)						South Worcestershire	1 April 2028
Hereford and Worcester (NM)		Worcestershire (NM)				–	Wychavon (NM)						South Worcestershire	1 April 2028
Hereford and Worcester (NM)		Worcestershire (NM)				–	Bromsgrove (NM)						North Worcestershire	1 April 2028
Hereford and Worcester (NM)		Worcestershire (NM)				–	Redditch (B, NM)						North Worcestershire	1 April 2028
Hereford and Worcester (NM)		Worcestershire (NM)				–	Wyre Forest (NM)						North Worcestershire	1 April 2028
1974	1988	1998	2009	2019	2023	2028	1974	1988	1998	2009	2019	2023	2028	
Hertfordshire (NM)						–	Broxbourne (B, NM)						East Hertfordshire and Broxbourne (Note: Including some parts of Welwyn Hatfield and excluding some parts of North Hertfordshire)	1 April 2028
Hertfordshire (NM)						–	East Hertfordshire (NM)						East Hertfordshire and Broxbourne	1 April 2028
Hertfordshire (NM)						–	North Hertfordshire (NM)						East Hertfordshire and Broxbourne	1 April 2028
Hertfordshire (NM)						–	Stevenage (B, NM)						Central Hertfordshire (Note: Including some parts of North Hertfordshire and excluding some parts of Welwyn Hatfield)	1 April 2028
Hertfordshire (NM)						–	Welwyn Hatfield (B, NM)						Central Hertfordshire	1 April 2028
Hertfordshire (NM)						–	Dacorum (B, NM)						West Hertfordshire	1 April 2028
Hertfordshire (NM)						–	St Albans (NM, City)						West Hertfordshire	1 April 2028
Hertfordshire (NM)						–	Hertsmere (B, NM)						South West Hertfordshire	1 April 2028
Hertfordshire (NM)						–	Three Rivers (NM)						South West Hertfordshire	1 April 2028
Hertfordshire (NM)						–	Watford (B, NM)						South West Hertfordshire	1 April 2028
Humberside (NM)		–					Beverley (Note: Renamed to "East Yorkshire Borough of Beverley" on 12 May 1981) (B, NM)	East Yorkshire Borough of Beverley	East Riding of Yorkshire (Note: Excluding some parts of Boothferry)					1 April 1996
Humberside (NM)		–					Boothferry (B, NM)		East Riding of Yorkshire					1 April 1996
Humberside (NM)		–					Holderness (B, NM)		East Riding of Yorkshire					1 April 1996
Humberside (NM)		–					North Wolds (Note: Renamed to "East Yorkshire" on 1 February 1981) (B, NM)	East Yorkshire	East Riding of Yorkshire					1 April 1996
Humberside (NM)		–					Kingston upon Hull (NM, City)							1 April 1996
Humberside (NM)		–					Glanford (B, NM)		North Lincolnshire (Note: Including some parts of Boothferry)					1 April 1996
Humberside (NM)		–					Scunthorpe (B, NM)		North Lincolnshire					1 April 1996
Humberside (NM)		–					Cleethorpes (B, NM)		North East Lincolnshire					1 April 1996
Humberside (NM)		–					Grimsby (Note: Renamed to "Great Grimsby" on 1 January 1979) (B, NM)	Great Grimsby	North East Lincolnshire					1 April 1996
Isle of Wight (NM)		–					Medina (B, NM)		Isle of Wight					1 April 1995
Isle of Wight (NM)		–					South Wight (B, NM)		Isle of Wight					1 April 1995
Kent (NM)						–	Ashford (B, NM)						Mid Kent	1 April 2028
Kent (NM)						–	Shepway (Note: Renamed 1 April 2018) (NM)				Folkestone and Hythe		Mid Kent	1 April 2028
Kent (NM)						–	Swale (B, NM)						Mid Kent	1 April 2028
Kent (NM)						–	Canterbury (NM, City)						East Kent	1 April 2028
Kent (NM)						–	Dover (NM)						East Kent	1 April 2028
Kent (NM)						–	Thanet (NM)						East Kent	1 April 2028
Kent (NM)						–	Maidstone (B, NM)						West Kent	1 April 2028
Kent (NM)						–	Sevenoaks (NM)						West Kent	1 April 2028
Kent (NM)						–	Tonbridge and Malling (B, NM)						West Kent	1 April 2028
Kent (NM)						–	Tunbridge Wells (B, NM)						West Kent	1 April 2028
Kent (NM)						–	Dartford (B, NM)						North Kent	1 April 2028
Kent (NM)						–	Gravesham (B, NM)						North Kent	1 April 2028
		–					Gillingham (B, NM)		Medway				North Kent	1 April 1998
		–					Medway (Note: Renamed to "Rochester-upon-Medway" on 3 December 1979) (NM)	Rochester-upon-Medway (City)	Medway				North Kent	1 April 1998
1974	1988	1998	2009	2019	2023	2028	1974	1988	1998	2009	2019	2023	2028	
		–					Blackburn (B, NM)		Blackburn with Darwen (Note: Renamed 2 May 1997.)				Pennine Lancashire	1 April 1998
Lancashire (NM)						–	Burnley (B, NM)						Pennine Lancashire	1 April 2028
Lancashire (NM)						–	Hyndburn (B, NM)						Pennine Lancashire	1 April 2028
Lancashire (NM)						–	Pendle (B, NM)						Pennine Lancashire	1 April 2028
Lancashire (NM)						–	Rossendale (B, NM)						Pennine Lancashire	1 April 2028
Lancashire (NM)						–	Chorley (B, NM)						South Lancashire	1 April 2028
Lancashire (NM)						–	South Ribble (B, NM)						South Lancashire	1 April 2028
Lancashire (NM)						–	West Lancashire (B, NM)						South Lancashire	1 April 2028
Lancashire (NM)						–	Lancaster (NM, City)						North Lancashire	1 April 2028
Lancashire (NM)						–	Preston (NM, City)						North Lancashire	1 April 2028
Lancashire (NM)						–	Ribble Valley (B, NM)						North Lancashire	1 April 2028
Lancashire (NM)						–	Fylde (B, NM)						Fylde Coast	1 April 2028
Lancashire (NM)						–	Wyre (B, NM)						Fylde Coast	1 April 2028
		–					Blackpool (B, NM)						Fylde Coast	1 April 1998
		–					Leicester (NM, City)						Leicester (Note: Expanding to include Oadby and Wigston, most of Blaby, and parts of Charnwood and South Leicestershire in 2028)	1 April 1997
Leicestershire (NM)						–	Blaby (NM)						Leicester	1 April 2028
Leicestershire (NM)						–	Oadby and Wigston (B, NM)						Leicester	1 April 2028
Leicestershire (NM)						–	Charnwood (B, NM)						Leicestershire and Rutland (Note: Including parts of Blaby; excluding parts of Charnwood and South Leicestershire)	1 April 2028
Leicestershire (NM)						–	Harborough (NM)						Leicestershire and Rutland	1 April 2028
Leicestershire (NM)						–	Hinckley and Bosworth (B, NM)						Leicestershire and Rutland	1 April 2028
Leicestershire (NM)						–	Melton (B, NM)						Leicestershire and Rutland	1 April 2028
Leicestershire (NM)						–	North West Leicestershire (NM)						Leicestershire and Rutland	1 April 2028
		–					Rutland (NM)						Leicestershire and Rutland	1 April 1997
Lincolnshire (NM)						–	Lincoln (Note: Expanding to include areas from North Kesteven and West Lindsey from 2028) (NM, City)							1 April 2028
Lincolnshire (NM)						–	Boston (B, NM)						Lincolnshire (Note: Excluding some areas from North Kesteven and West Lindsey)	1 April 2028
Lincolnshire (NM)						–	East Lindsey (NM)						Lincolnshire	1 April 2028
Lincolnshire (NM)						–	North Kesteven (NM)						Lincolnshire	1 April 2028
Lincolnshire (NM)						–	South Holland (NM)						Lincolnshire	1 April 2028
Lincolnshire (NM)						–	South Kesteven (NM)						Lincolnshire	1 April 2028
Lincolnshire (NM)						–	West Lindsey (NM)						Lincolnshire	1 April 2028
1974	1988	1998	2009	2019	2023	2028	1974	1988	1998	2009	2019	2023	2028	
Merseyside (M)	–						Knowsley (B, M)							1 April 1986
Merseyside (M)	–						Liverpool (M, City)							1 April 1986
Merseyside (M)	–						St Helens (B, M)							1 April 1986
Merseyside (M)	–						Sefton (B, M)							1 April 1986
Merseyside (M)	–						Wirral (B, M)							1 April 1986
Norfolk (NM)						–	Breckland (NM)						West Norfolk (Note: Also including some areas from South Norfolk)	1 April 2028
Norfolk (NM)						–	West Norfolk (Note: Renamed 14 May 1981) (B, NM)	King's Lynn and West Norfolk					West Norfolk	1 April 2028
Norfolk (NM)						–	Broadland (NM)						East Norfolk (Note: Excluding some areas from Broadland and South Norfolk)	1 April 2028
Norfolk (NM)						–	Great Yarmouth (B, NM)						East Norfolk	1 April 2028
Norfolk (NM)						–	North Norfolk (Note: Initially named "Pastonacres" in legislation; renamed on 20 September 1973 by shadow authority before coming into force.) (NM)						East Norfolk	1 April 2028
Norfolk (NM)						–	South Norfolk (NM)						East Norfolk	1 April 2028
Norfolk (NM)						–	Norwich (NM, City)						Greater Norwich (Note: Including some areas from Broadland and South Norfolk)	1 April 2028
North Yorkshire (NM)					–		Craven (NM)					North Yorkshire		1 April 2023
North Yorkshire (NM)					–		Hambleton (Note: Some areas from Hambleton, Ryedale and Selby transferred to York in 1996) (NM)					North Yorkshire		1 April 2023
North Yorkshire (NM)					–		Harrogate (B, NM)					North Yorkshire		1 April 2023
North Yorkshire (NM)					–		Richmondshire (NM)					North Yorkshire		1 April 2023
North Yorkshire (NM)					–		Ryedale (NM)					North Yorkshire		1 April 2023
North Yorkshire (NM)					–		Scarborough (B, NM)					North Yorkshire		1 April 2023
North Yorkshire (NM)					–		Selby (NM)					North Yorkshire		1 April 2023
		–					York (NM, City)		York					1 April 1996
Northamptonshire (NM)					–		Corby (B, NM)					North Northamptonshire		1 April 2021
Northamptonshire (NM)					–		East Northamptonshire (NM)					North Northamptonshire		1 April 2021
Northamptonshire (NM)					–		Kettering (B, NM)					North Northamptonshire		1 April 2021
Northamptonshire (NM)					–		Wellingborough (B, NM)					North Northamptonshire		1 April 2021
Northamptonshire (NM)					–		Daventry (NM)					West Northamptonshire		1 April 2021
Northamptonshire (NM)					–		Northampton (B, NM)					West Northamptonshire		1 April 2021
Northamptonshire (NM)					–		South Northamptonshire (NM)					West Northamptonshire		1 April 2021
1974	1988	1998	2009	2019	2023	2028	1974	1988	1998	2009	2019	2023	2028	
Northumberland (NM)			–				Alnwick (NM)			Northumberland				1 April 2009
Northumberland (NM)			–				Berwick-upon-Tweed (B, NM)			Northumberland				1 April 2009
Northumberland (NM)			–				Blyth Valley (B, NM)			Northumberland				1 April 2009
Northumberland (NM)			–				Castle Morpeth (B, NM)			Northumberland				1 April 2009
Northumberland (NM)			–				Tynedale (NM)			Northumberland				1 April 2009
Northumberland (NM)			–				Wansbeck (NM)			Northumberland				1 April 2009
Nottinghamshire (NM)						–	Ashfield (NM)						Nottinghamshire (Note: Including some areas from Broxtowe, Gedling and Rushcliffe)	1 April 2028
Nottinghamshire (NM)						–	Bassetlaw (NM)						Nottinghamshire	1 April 2028
Nottinghamshire (NM)						–	Mansfield (NM)						Nottinghamshire	1 April 2028
Nottinghamshire (NM)						–	Newark (Note: Renamed 1 April 1985) (NM)	Newark and Sherwood					Nottinghamshire	1 April 2028
Nottinghamshire (NM)						–	Broxtowe (B, NM)						Greater Nottingham (Note: Excluding some areas from Broxtowe, Gedling and Rushcliffe)	1 April 2028
Nottinghamshire (NM)						–	Gedling (B, NM)						Greater Nottingham	1 April 2028
Nottinghamshire (NM)						–	Rushcliffe (B, NM)						Greater Nottingham	1 April 2028
		–					Nottingham (NM, City)						Greater Nottingham	1 April 1997
Salop (Note: Renamed 1 April 1980) (NM)	Shropshire		–				Bridgnorth (NM)			Shropshire				1 April 2009
Salop (NM)	Shropshire		–				North Shropshire (NM)			Shropshire				1 April 2009
Salop (NM)	Shropshire		–				Oswestry (B, NM)			Shropshire				1 April 2009
Salop (NM)	Shropshire		–				Shrewsbury (Note: Renamed 12 June 1974) (B, NM)	Shrewsbury and Atcham		Shropshire				1 April 2009
Salop (NM)	Shropshire		–				South Shropshire (NM)			Shropshire				1 April 2009
Salop (NM)		–					The Wrekin (Note: Initially named "Wrekin" in legislation; renamed to "The Wrekin" on 17 January 1974 by shadow authority before coming into force.) (B, NM)		Telford and Wrekin (Note: Renamed 1 April 1998)					1 April 1998
Somerset (NM)					–		Mendip (NM)					Somerset		1 April 2023
Somerset (NM)					–		Sedgemoor (NM)					Somerset		1 April 2023
Somerset (NM)					–		Yeovil (Note: Renamed 1 April 1985) (NM)	South Somerset				Somerset		1 April 2023
Somerset (NM)					–		Taunton Deane (B, NM)				Somerset West and Taunton (Note: Created 1 April 2019) (NM)	Somerset		1 April 2023
Somerset (NM)					–		West Somerset (NM)				Somerset West and Taunton (NM)	Somerset		1 April 2023
South Yorkshire (M)	–						Barnsley (B, M)							1 April 1986
South Yorkshire (M)	–						Doncaster (B, M)							1 April 1986
South Yorkshire (M)	–						Rotherham (B, M)							1 April 1986
South Yorkshire (M)	–						Sheffield (M, City)							1 April 1986
1974	1988	1998	2009	2019	2023	2028	1974	1988	1998	2009	2019	2023	2028	
Staffordshire (NM)						–	Cannock Chase (NM)						South and Mid Staffordshire	1 April 2028
Staffordshire (NM)						–	East Staffordshire (B, NM)						South and Mid Staffordshire	1 April 2028
Staffordshire (NM)						–	Lichfield (NM)						South and Mid Staffordshire	1 April 2028
Staffordshire (NM)						–	South Staffordshire (NM)						South and Mid Staffordshire	1 April 2028
Staffordshire (NM)						–	Stafford (B, NM)						South and Mid Staffordshire	1 April 2028
Staffordshire (NM)						–	Tamworth (B, NM)						South and Mid Staffordshire	1 April 2028
Staffordshire (NM)						–	Newcastle-under-Lyme (B, NM)						North Staffordshire	1 April 2028
Staffordshire (NM)						–	Staffordshire Moorlands (NM)						North Staffordshire	1 April 2028
		–					Stoke-on-Trent (NM, City)						North Staffordshire	1 April 1998
Suffolk (NM)						–	Babergh (NM)						Western Suffolk (Note: Including some areas from Mid Suffolk; excluding some areas from Babergh)	1 April 2028
Suffolk (NM)						–	Forest Heath (NM)				West Suffolk (Note: Created 1 April 2019) (NM)		Western Suffolk	1 April 2028
Suffolk (NM)						–	St Edmundsbury (B, NM)				West Suffolk (NM)		Western Suffolk	1 April 2028
Suffolk (NM)						–	Ipswich (B, NM)						Ipswich and South Suffolk (Note: Including some areas from Babergh, Mid Suffolk and Suffolk Coastal)	1 April 2028
Suffolk (NM)						–	Mid Suffolk (NM)						Central and Eastern Suffolk (Note: Excluding some areas from East Suffolk and Mid Suffolk)	1 April 2028
Suffolk (NM)						–	Suffolk Coastal (NM)				East Suffolk (Note: Created 1 April 2019) (NM)		Central and Eastern Suffolk	1 April 2028
Suffolk (NM)						–	Waveney (NM)				East Suffolk (NM)		Central and Eastern Suffolk	1 April 2028
Surrey (NM)						–	Elmbridge (B, NM)						East Surrey	1 April 2027
Surrey (NM)						–	Epsom and Ewell (B, NM)						East Surrey	1 April 2027
Surrey (NM)						–	Mole Valley (NM)						East Surrey	1 April 2027
Surrey (NM)						–	Reigate and Banstead (B, NM)						East Surrey	1 April 2027
Surrey (NM)						–	Tandridge (NM)						East Surrey	1 April 2027
Surrey (NM)						–	Guildford (B, NM)						West Surrey	1 April 2027
Surrey (NM)						–	Runnymede (B, NM)						West Surrey	1 April 2027
Surrey (NM)						–	Spelthorne (B, NM)						West Surrey	1 April 2027
Surrey (NM)						–	Surrey Heath (B, NM)						West Surrey	1 April 2027
Surrey (NM)						–	Waverley (B, NM)						West Surrey	1 April 2027
Surrey (NM)						–	Woking (B, NM)						West Surrey	1 April 2027
Tyne and Wear (M)	–						Gateshead (B, M)							1 April 1986
Tyne and Wear (M)	–						Newcastle upon Tyne (M, City)							1 April 1986
Tyne and Wear (M)	–						North Tyneside (B, M)							1 April 1986
Tyne and Wear (M)	–						South Tyneside (B, M)							1 April 1986
Tyne and Wear (M)	–						Sunderland (M, City)							1 April 1986
1974	1988	1998	2009	2019	2023	2028	1974	1988	1998	2009	2019	2023	2028	
Warwickshire (NM)						–	North Warwickshire (B, NM)						North Warwickshire	1 April 2028
Warwickshire (NM)						–	Nuneaton (Note: Renamed 1 October 1980) (B, NM)	Nuneaton and Bedworth					North Warwickshire	1 April 2028
Warwickshire (NM)						–	Rugby (B, NM)						North Warwickshire	1 April 2028
Warwickshire (NM)						–	Stratford-on-Avon (NM)						South Warwickshire	1 April 2028
Warwickshire (NM)						–	Warwick (NM)						South Warwickshire	1 April 2028
West Midlands (M)	–						Birmingham (M, City)							1 April 1986
West Midlands (M)	–						Coventry (M, City)							1 April 1986
West Midlands (M)	–						Dudley (B, M)							1 April 1986
West Midlands (M)	–						Sandwell (B, M)							1 April 1986
West Midlands (M)	–						Solihull (B, M)							1 April 1986
West Midlands (M)	–						Walsall (B, M)							1 April 1986
West Midlands (M)	–						Wolverhampton (M, City (2000))							1 April 1986
West Sussex (NM)						–	Adur (NM)						TBD	1 April 2028
West Sussex (NM)						–	Arun (NM)						TBD	1 April 2028
West Sussex (NM)						–	Worthing (B, NM)						TBD	1 April 2028
West Sussex (NM)						–	Chichester (NM)						TBD	1 April 2028
West Sussex (NM)						–	Crawley (B, NM)						TBD	1 April 2028
West Sussex (NM)						–	Horsham (NM)						TBD	1 April 2028
West Sussex (NM)						–	Mid Sussex (NM)						TBD	1 April 2028
West Yorkshire (M)	–						Bradford (M, City)							1 April 1986
West Yorkshire (M)	–						Calderdale (B, M)							1 April 1986
West Yorkshire (M)	–						Kirklees (B, M)							1 April 1986
West Yorkshire (M)	–						Leeds (M, City)							1 April 1986
West Yorkshire (M)	–						Wakefield (M, City)							1 April 1986
Wiltshire (NM)			–				Kennet (NM)			Wiltshire				1 April 2009
Wiltshire (NM)			–				North Wiltshire (NM)			Wiltshire				1 April 2009
Wiltshire (NM)			–				Salisbury (NM)			Wiltshire				1 April 2009
Wiltshire (NM)			–				West Wiltshire (NM)			Wiltshire				1 April 2009
		–					Thamesdown (B, NM)		Swindon (Note: Renamed 1 April 1997)					1 April 1997
1974	1988	1998	2009	2019	2023	2028	1974	1988	1998	2009	2019	2023	2028	

== List of remaining two-tier counties ==
As of May 2026, this is a list of the remaining two-tier counties of England. These are two-tier non-metropolitan counties with a county council and district council structure.

Two-tier counties of England
Non-metropolitan county	Land area		Population (2025)	Density	
Non-metropolitan county	(km^{2})	(mi^{2})	Population (2025)	(/km^{2})	(/mi^{2})
Cambridgeshire	3,046	1,176	716,983	235	610
Derbyshire	2,547	983	827,217	325	840
Devon	6,564	2,534	845,541	129	330
East Sussex	1,709	660	561,855	329	850
Essex	3,458	1,335	1,576,125	456	1,180
Gloucestershire	2,652	1,024	671,908	253	660
Hampshire	3,678	1,420	1,451,703	395	1,020
Hertfordshire	1,643	634	1,239,398	754	1,950
Kent	3,544	1,368	1,652,769	466	1,210
Lancashire	2,894	1,117	1,308,567	452	1,170
Leicestershire	2,083	804	752,448	361	930
Lincolnshire	5,937	2,292	794,009	134	350
Norfolk	5,384	2,079	945,427	176	460
Nottinghamshire	2,085	805	862,326	414	1,070
Oxfordshire	2,605	1,006	769,831	296	770
Staffordshire	2,620	1,010	913,073	348	900
Suffolk	3,800	1,500	789,850	208	540
Surrey	1,663	642	1,255,255	755	1,960
Warwickshire	1,975	763	644,021	326	840
West Sussex	1,991	769	921,240	463	1,200
Worcestershire	1,741	672	624,209	359	930
