= Central Hertfordshire =

- Propsed unitary authority area
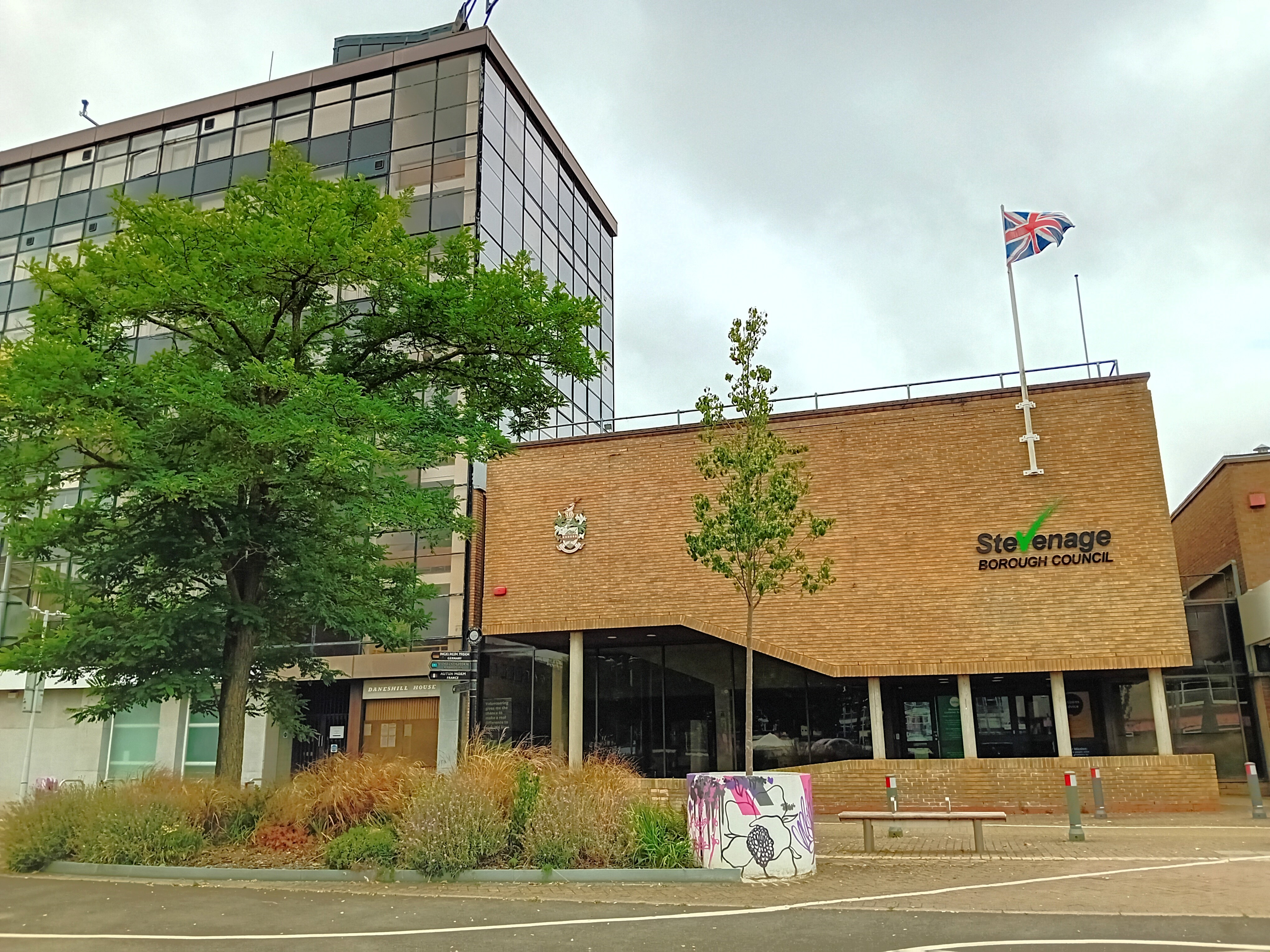
- Stevenage Borough Council headquarters

- Interactive map
- Coordinates: 51.9023°N 0.2008°W
- Sovereign state: United Kingdom
- Country: England
- Region: East of England
- Ceremonial county: Hertfordshire

Government
  - Type: Unitary authority
  - Body: Central Hertfordshire Council

Area
  - Total: 130 sq mi (337 km^{2})

Population (2024 estimate)
  - Total: 322,394
- Time zone: UTC+0 (GMT)
  - Summer (DST): UTC+1 (BST)

Central Hertfordshire was a proposed unitary authority area in the ceremonial county of Hertfordshire, England. It was planned to be formed on 1 April 2028, with elections to shadow authority planned to take place in May 2027. The largest settlement would have been Stevenage and it would also include Baldock, Hatfield, Hitchin, Letchworth and Welwyn Garden City. The area has a 2024 estimated population of 320,795. Plans to create it were halted in September 2026 and the 2027 election was cancelled. In October 2026, plans to create it were withdrawn.

== Formation ==
It would have been formed from the district of Stevenage, combined with most of the districts of North Hertfordshire and Welwyn Hatfield. The wards of Ermine, Royston Heath, Royston Meridian, Royston Palace, and Weston and Sandon from North Hertfordshire and the Welwyn Hatfield ward of Northaw and Cuffley would instead have joined an Eastern Hertfordshire unitary.

The district was being formed as part of ongoing local government changes throughout England, in which all areas of the country that have separate county councils and district councils will see those replaced with single-tier, or unitary, local governance. In Hertfordshire there would have been four unitary authorities, with the other three being West Hertfordshire, South West Hertfordshire and East Hertfordshire and Broxbourne. The alternative proposals for two or three unitaries for Hertfordshire were not accepted.

In September 2026, the Hertfordshire proposals were halted by the government and placed under review. In October 2026, plans to create it were withdrawn. The decision was threatened with judicial review by Hertfordshire County Council.

== Governance ==
It would have been run by Central Hertfordshire Council, which would have comprised 89 councillors.

== Parishes ==
Baldock, Hitchin, Letchworth, Stevenage and Welwyn Garden City are currently unparished, the rest of the area is parished. Welwyn Hatfield Borough Council is considering the creation of a parish council for Welwyn Garden City.
