= East Hertfordshire and Broxbourne =

- Proposed unitary authority area
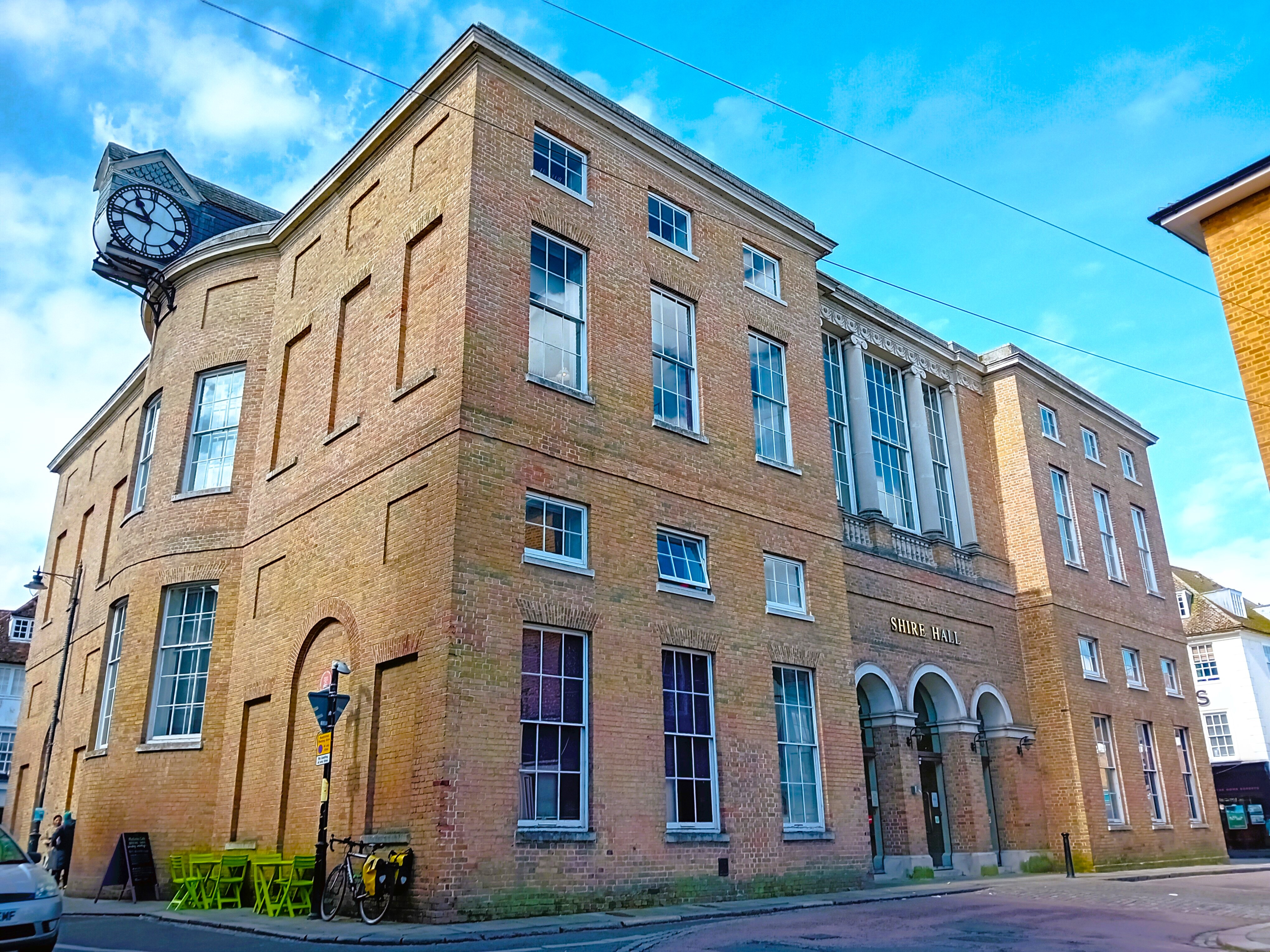
- Shire Hall, Hertford

- Interactive map
- Coordinates: 51.7962°N 0.0775°W
- Sovereign state: United Kingdom
- Country: England
- Region: East of England
- Ceremonial county: Hertfordshire

Government
  - Type: Unitary authority
  - Body: East Hertfordshire and Broxbourne Council

Area
  - Total: 278 sq mi (721 km^{2})

Population (2024 estimate)
  - Total: 288,175
- Time zone: UTC+0 (GMT)
  - Summer (DST): UTC+1 (BST)

East Hertfordshire and Broxbourne or Eastern Hertfordshire was a proposed unitary authority area in the ceremonial county of Hertfordshire, England. It was planned to be formed on 1 April 2028 and elections to a shadow authority were planned take place in May 2027. It would have contained the county town, Hertford. It was also planned to include Bishop's Stortford, Cheshunt, Hoddesdon, Royston, Waltham Cross and Ware. The area has a 2024 estimated population of 284,893. Plans to create it were halted in September 2026 and the first election was cancelled. In October 2026, the plans to create it were withdrawn.

== Formation ==
It was to be formed from the Broxbourne and East Hertfordshire districts plus five wards from North Hertfordshire (Ermine, Royston Heath, Royston Meridian, Royston Palace, and Weston and Sandon) and one ward (Northaw and Cuffley) from Welwyn Hatfield. Cheshunt and Hoddesdon are currently unparished, the rest of the area is parished.

It was being formed as part of ongoing local government changes throughout England, in which all areas of the country that have separate county councils and district councils will see those replaced with single-tier, or unitary, local governance. The alternative proposals for two and three unitaries were not accepted.

In September 2026, the Hertfordshire proposals were halted by the government and placed under review. In October 2026, plans to create it were withdrawn. The decision was threatened with judicial review by Hertfordshire County Council.

== Governance ==
It was to be run by East Hertfordshire and Broxbourne Council, which would comprise 75 councillors.

== Name ==
The name of the proposed council has changed throughout its development. The current name in use for the proposed council is 'East Hertfordshire and Broxbourne', however, this is not confirmed as a final decision. Councils are able to change their official name under the Local Government Act 1972 through a two-thirds majority of councillors.

The original name of 'Eastern Hertfordshire' was the temporary name given in the Ministry of Housing, Communities and Local Government's original 'Proposals for local government reorganisation in Hertfordshire', to describe the proposed plan to merge district councils on the eastern side of Hertfordshire into unitary councils. Other proposed names in this document were also based on the general geographical location of the proposed unitary councils as described with the cardinal and ordinal directions.

On 16 July 2026, when the proposal to split Hertfordshire into four unitary councils was confirmed, the names used in the proposal were directly used as the names given to the confirmed councils to be implemented, with these being North West Hertfordshire, South West Hertfordshire, Central Hertfordshire and Eastern Hertfordshire.

The 'Eastern Hertfordshire' name was opposed by Broxbourne Borough Council Leader Corina Gander, due to the name's overall similarity to that of the existing East Hertfordshire Council, raising concerns that the similarities of the two names may result in the new council being "called East Herts", which was a shortened name already used for the existing East Hertfordshire area. Gander argued that the name may not fully represent the Broxbourne Borough area, noting that "East Herts wouldn’t lose their identity but Broxbourne would."

The name of the council was officially altered on 21 July 2026 to 'East Hertfordshire and Broxbourne', after the requests and feedback from councillors. This was the name used in proposals as of 10 August 2026; however, the name of the council is not final and will only be officially set out in "secondary legislation establishing them".

In addition, in late July 2026, there was a proposal for the name of the new council to be altered to 'Ermine', taking after the Roman road Ermine Street which was routed through Ware, Braughing, and Royston. All of the above locations mentioned are planned to be included in the new unitary council, although the Roman road also extends between London and York. The proposal was introduced in opposition to the 'East Hertfordshire and Broxbourne' name, brought forward particularly by councillors from the five wards of North Hertfordshire, as the name would only represent the former district councils of East Hertfordshire and Broxbourne. One notable supporter of the 'Ermine' name was North Hertfordshire Councillor Ruth Brown, who said on the matter, "The proposed name of East Hertfordshire & Broxbourne sounds like an amalgamation of the two previous councils and completely fails to recognise the inclusion of Royston and the surrounding villages."
