= Tring (hundred) =

Historical hundred

Tring hundred was a judicial and taxation subdivision (a hundred) of Hertfordshire, in the west of the county, that existed from the 10th century until it was absorbed by neighbouring Dacorum hundred in the 16th century.

Tring contained the parishes of Aldbury, Great Berkhampsted, Little Gaddesden, Hemel Hempstead, King's Langley, Puttenham, Redbourn (partial), Shenley, Tring, Wigginton and Great Gaddesden (partial).

Haslam proposes that the hundred was originally part of a larger "proto-hundred" which comprised the Hertfordshire hundred of Tring, Yardley hundred in Buckinghamshire and Stanbridge hundred in Bedfordshire; this territory was originally created to support the burh at Leighton Buzzard built by King Edward the Elder in the 900s to defend against the Danes. The interlocking nature of Yardley and Tring hundreds is taken as evidence that they were originally part of a single unit that was later subdivided into three hundreds, each of whom was then grouped into a separate county.
