= Danais (hundred) =

Historical division of Hertfordshire, England

Coordinates: 51°46′N 00°32′W

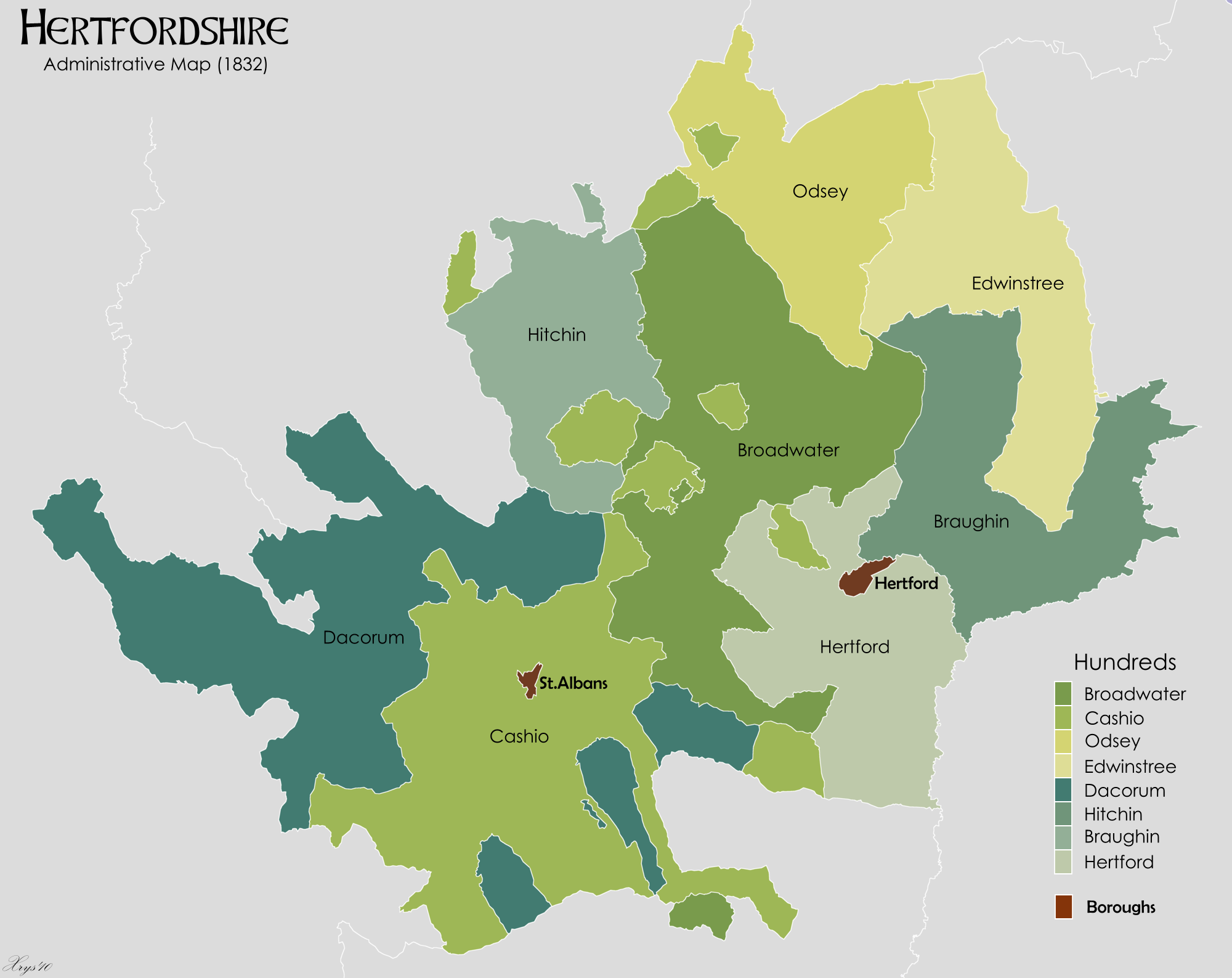
Hundreds of Hertfordshire in 1832

Danais (Latinised as Dacorum) Hundred was a judicial and taxation subdivision (a hundred) of Hertfordshire, in the west of the county, that existed from the 10th to the 19th century. It gave its name to the modern local government district of Dacorum, established in 1974, which covers a similar area. Danais was Latinised to Dacorum in 1196. The name Danais means the Hundred of the Danes and refers to its incorporation into the Danelaw for a period in the tenth century.

The territory of the hundred is interwoven with that of Cashio (also known as the "Liberty of St Albans"), which suggests that Cashio was carved out of Danais in the early eleventh century in order to provide a single jurisdiction for the Abbot of St Albans.

The parishes in Danais at the time of Domesday were:

- Abbots Langley (partial)
- Aldenham
- Barworth
- Bushey
- Caddington
- Flamstead
- Great Gaddesden (partial)
- Kensworth
- Redbourn (partial)
- Shenley
- Wheathampstead
- Windbridge (partial)

Haslam proposes that Danais hundred, including those parts of Cashio that had been carved out, was originally a larger "proto-hundred" which was originally created to support the burh at St Albans built by King Edward the Elder in the 900s to defend against the Danes, who had been pushed back to the River Lea. The interlocking nature of Danais and Cashio hundreds, together with the unique status of Cashio as a Liberty of the church, is taken as evidence that they were originally part of a single unit that was later subdivided into hundreds.

In the 16th century, Dacorum absorbed the hundred of Tring, and afterwards the hundred also included the following parishes:

- Aldbury
- Great Berkhampsted
- Little Gaddesden
- Hemel Hempstead
- King's Langley
- Puttenham
- Redbourn (remainder)
- Shenley
- Wigginton
- Great Gaddesden (remainder)

== See also ==
- List of hundreds of England and Wales - Hertfordshire
