= Hertfordshire =

County of England

- Non-metropolitan and ceremonial county
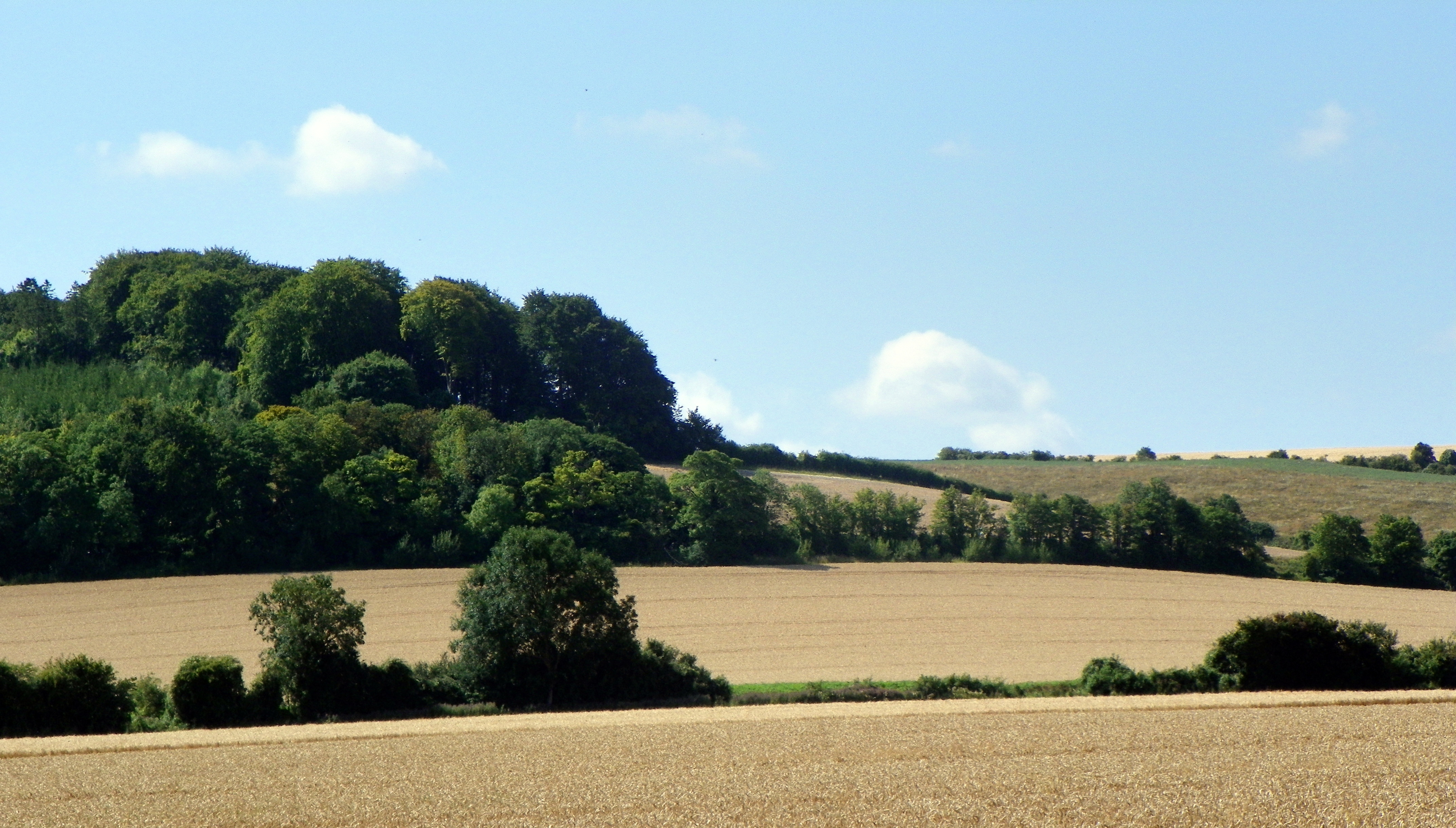
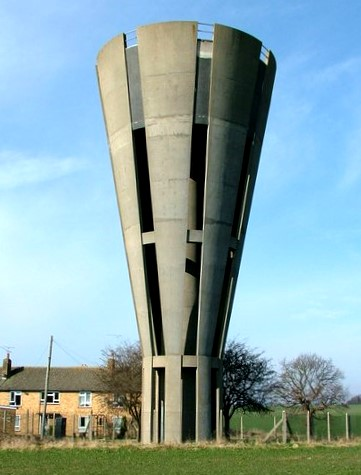
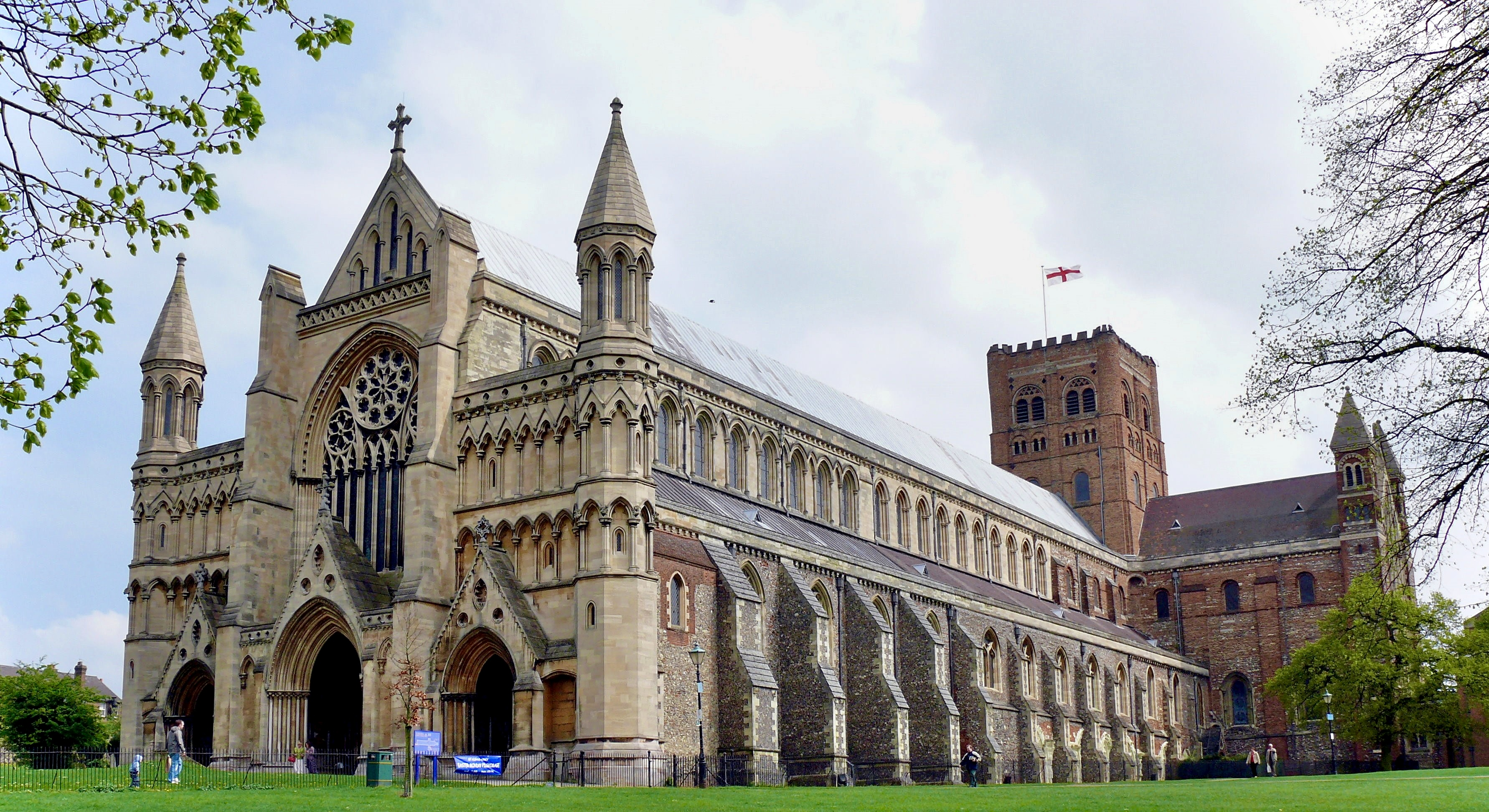
- The Chiltern Hills near Hexton, Tonwell Water Tower, and St Albans Cathedral

- Coordinates: 51°49′N 0°13′W
- Sovereign state: United Kingdom
- Constituent country: England
- Region: East of England
- Established: Likely 10th century
- Time zone: UTC+0 (GMT)
  - Summer (DST): UTC+1 (BST)
- UK Parliament: List of MPs
- Police: Hertfordshire Constabulary
- County town: Hertford
- Largest town: Watford
- Ceremonial county
- Lord Lieutenant: Robert Voss
- High Sheriff: Anna Louise Rankin
- Area: 1,643 km^{2} (634 sq mi)
  - Rank: 36th of 48
- Population (2024): 1,236,191
  - Rank: 13th of 48
  - Density: 752/km^{2} (1,950/sq mi)
- Non-metropolitan county
- County council: Hertfordshire County Council
- Control: No overall control
- Admin HQ: Hertford
- Area: 1,643 km^{2} (634 sq mi)
  - Rank: 21st of 21
- Population (2025): 1,239,398
  - Rank: 6th of 21
  - Density: 754/km^{2} (1,950/sq mi)
- ISO 3166-2: GB-HRT
- GSS code: E10000015
- ITL: UKH23
- Website: hertfordshire.gov.uk
- Districts
- Districts of Hertfordshire
- Districts: List: North Hertfordshire; Stevenage; East Hertfordshire; Dacorum; St Albans; Welwyn Hatfield; Broxbourne; Three Rivers; Watford; Hertsmere

Hertfordshire (/ˈhɑːrt.fərd.ʃər/ /-.ʃɪər/, HART-fərd-shər, -sheer; often abbreviated Herts) is a ceremonial county in the East of England. It borders Bedfordshire to the north-west, Cambridgeshire to the north-east, Essex to the east, Greater London to the south and Buckinghamshire to the west. The largest settlement is Watford.

The county has an area of 634 square miles (1,640 km^{2}) and had an estimated population of 1,236,191 in 2024. Watford is in the south-west of the county, and its other settlements include Stevenage in the north, the city of St Albans in the centre, and Hemel Hempstead in the west. For local government purposes Hertfordshire is a non-metropolitan county with ten districts. Potters Bar in the south-east of the county was historically part of Middlesex.

Hertfordshire centres on the headwaters and upper valleys of the rivers Lea and the Colne; both flow south and each is accompanied by a canal. Elevations are higher in the north and west, reaching more than 800 feet (240 m) in the Chilterns near Tring. Hertfordshire's undeveloped land is mainly agricultural and much of the county is covered by the Metropolitan green belt.

Since 1903, Letchworth, in the far north, has served as the prototype garden city while Stevenage became the first town to expand under post-war Britain's New Towns Act 1946. Services have become the largest sector of the county's economy.

== History ==
The county's landmarks span many centuries, ranging from the Six Hills in Stevenage built by local inhabitants during the Roman period, to Leavesden Film Studios. The volume of intact medieval and Tudor buildings surpasses London, in places in well-preserved conservation areas, especially in St Albans, which includes remains of the Roman town of Verulamium.

In 913, Hertfordshire was the area assigned to a fortress constructed at Hertford under the rule of Edward the Elder. Hertford is derived from the Anglo-Saxon heort ford, meaning deer crossing (of a watercourse). The name Hertfordshire is first recorded in the Anglo-Saxon Chronicle in 1011. Deer feature in many county emblems. Many of the names of the current settlements date back to the Anglo-Saxon period, with many featuring standard placename suffixes attributed to the Anglo-Saxons: "ford", "ton", "den", "bourn", "ley", "stead", "ing", "lett", "wood", and "worth", are represented in this county by Hertford, Royston, Harpenden, Redbourn, Cuffley, Wheathampstead, Tring, Radlett, Borehamwood and Rickmansworth.

There is evidence of human life in Hertfordshire from the Mesolithic period. It was first farmed during the Neolithic period and permanent habitation appeared at the beginning of the Bronze Age. This was followed by tribes settling in the area during the Iron Age.

Following the Roman conquest of Britain in AD 43, the Catuvellauni tribe accepted peace and adapted to Roman life, resulting in the development of several new towns, including Verulamium (St Albans), where in c. 293 the first recorded British martyrdom is traditionally believed to have taken place. Saint Alban, a Romano-British soldier, took the place of a Christian priest and was beheaded on Holywell Hill. His martyr's cross of a yellow saltire on a blue field is reflected in the flag and coat of arms of Hertfordshire as the yellow field to the stag or Hart representing the county. He is the Patron Saint of Hertfordshire.

With the departure of the Roman Legions in the early 5th century, the now-unprotected territory was invaded and colonised by the Anglo-Saxons. By the 6th century, the majority of the modern county was part of the Kingdom of Essex.

Over time the Kingdom of Essex lost its western areas (including most of its areas that are now part of modern Hertfordshire) to the western Anglians of Mercia, and the core eastern area of Essex (of which the modern county of Essex was the main part) lost its independence to Wessex in 825. The region finally became an English shire in the 10th century, on the merger of the West Saxon and Mercian kingdoms.

In the midst of the Norse invasions, Hertfordshire was on the front lines of much of the fighting. King Edward the Elder, in his reconquest of Norse-held lands in what was to become England, established a "burh" or fort in Hertford, which was to curb Norse activities in the area. His father, King Alfred the Great, established the River Lea as a boundary between his kingdom and that of the Norse lord Guthrum, with the north and eastern parts of the county being within the Danelaw. There is little evidence however of Norse placenames within this region, and many of the Anglo-Saxon features remained intact to this day. The county however suffered from renewed Norse raids in the late 10th to early 11th centuries, as armies led by Danish kings Swein Forkbeard and Cnut the Great harried the country as part of their attempts to undermine and overthrow English king Æthelred the Unready.

=== Norman invasion onwards ===
A century later, William of Normandy received the surrender of some senior English Lords and Clergy at Berkhamsted, before entering London unopposed and being crowned at Westminster. Hertfordshire was used for some of the new Norman castles at Bishop's Stortford, and at King's Langley, a staging post between London and the royal residence of Berkhamsted.

The Domesday Book recorded the county as having nine hundreds. Tring and Danais became one—Dacorum—from Danis Corum or Danish rule harking back to a Viking not Saxon past. The other seven were Braughing, Stevenage, Cashio, Buntingford, Hertford, Hitchin and Odsey.

In the later Plantagenet period, St. Albans Abbey was an initial drafting place of what was to become Magna Carta. And in the later Wars of the Roses, St. Albans was the scene of two major battles between the Lancastrians and the Yorkists.

In Tudor times, Hatfield House was often visited by Queen Elizabeth I. Stuart King James I used the locale for hunting and facilitated the construction of a waterway, the New River, supplying drinking water to London.

As London grew, Hertfordshire became conveniently close to the English capital; much of the area was owned by the nobility and aristocracy, this patronage helped to boost the local economy. However, the greatest boost to Hertfordshire came during the Industrial Revolution, after which the population rose dramatically. In 1903, Letchworth became the world's first garden city and Stevenage became the first town to redevelop under the New Towns Act 1946 (9 & 10 Geo. 6. c. 68).

The flag of the historic county of Hertfordshire

The first shooting-down of a zeppelin over Great Britain during WW1 happened in Cuffley.

From the 1920s until the late 1980s, the town of Borehamwood was home to one of the major British film studio complexes, including the MGM-British Studios. Many well-known films were made here including the first three Star Wars movies (IV, V, & VI). The studios generally used the name of Elstree. American director Stanley Kubrick not only used to shoot in those studios but also lived in the area until his death. Big Brother UK and Who Wants to Be a Millionaire? have been filmed there. EastEnders is filmed at Elstree. Hertfordshire has seen development at Warner Bros. Studios, Leavesden; the Harry Potter series was filmed here and the 1995 James Bond film GoldenEye.

On 17 October 2000, the Hatfield rail crash killed four people with over 70 injured. The crash exposed the shortcomings of Railtrack, and resulted in speed restrictions and major track replacement. On 10 May 2002, seven people died in the fourth of the Potters Bar rail accidents; the train was travelling at high speed when it derailed and flipped into the air when one of the carriages slid along the platform where it came to rest.

In early December 2005, there were explosions at the Hertfordshire Oil Storage Terminal at Buncefield on the edge of Hemel Hempstead.

== Geography ==
Hertfordshire is located in the south-eastern part of England and is the county immediately north of London. It is officially part of the East of England region, a mainly statistical unit. To the east is Essex, to the west is Buckinghamshire and to the north are Bedfordshire and Cambridgeshire. A significant minority of the population across all districts commute to Central London.

The county's boundaries were roughly fixed by the Counties (Detached Parts) Act 1844 which eliminated exclaves; amended when, in 1965 under the London Government Act 1963, East Barnet Urban District and Barnet Urban District were abolished, their area was transferred to form part of the present-day London Borough of Barnet and the Potters Bar Urban District of Middlesex was transferred to Hertfordshire.

The highest point in the county is at 244 m (801 ft) (AOD) on the Ridgeway long distance national path, on the border of Hastoe near Tring with Drayton Beauchamp, Buckinghamshire.

At the 2011 census, among the county's ten districts, East Hertfordshire had the lowest population density (290 people per km^{2}) while the Borough of Watford had the highest (4210 per km^{2}). Compared with neighbouring Bedfordshire and Buckinghamshire, Hertfordshire lacks large towns or cities on the scale of Luton or Milton Keynes, whose populations exceed 200,000, but its overall population (1.2 million in 2021) is greater than those of the two aforementioned counties.

The River Lea flows through the county, passing Harpenden, Wheathampstead, Welwyn Garden City, Hertford, Ware, and Broxbourne before reaching Cheshunt and ultimately joining the River Thames. The far west of the county is the most hilly, with the Chiltern Hills surrounding Tring, Berkhamsted and the Ashridge estate. This Area of Outstanding Natural Beauty runs from near Hitchin in the north to Berkshire and Oxfordshire.

Many of the county's major settlements are in the central, northern and southern areas, such as Watford, Hemel Hempstead, Kings Langley, Rickmansworth, St. Albans, Harpenden, Redbourn, Radlett, Borehamwood, Potters Bar, Stevenage, Hatfield, Welwyn and Welwyn Garden City, Hitchin, Letchworth and Baldock. These are all small to medium-sized locations, featuring a mix of post-WWII new towns and older/more historical locales. The City of St. Albans is an example of a historical settlement, as its cathedral and abbey date to the Norman period, and there are ruins from the Roman settlement of Verulamium nearby the current city centre. Stevenage is a mix of post-WWII new town planning amidst its prior incarnation as a smaller town. The Old Town in Stevenage represents this historic core and has many shops and buildings reflecting its pre-WWII heritage. Hitchin also has a historic centre, with many Tudor and Stuart era buildings interspersed amongst more contemporary structures.

Hertfordshire's eastern regions are predominantly rural and arable, intermixed with villages and small to medium-sized towns. Royston, Buntingford and Bishop's Stortford, as well as Ware and the county town of Hertford are major settlements in this regard. The area is less elevated than the west, with gently rising and rivers such as the Stort. This river rises in Essex and terminates via a confluence with the Lea near to Ware. Apart from the Lea and Stort, the River Colne is the major watercourse in the county's west. This runs near Watford and Radlett, and has a complex system/drainage area running south into both Greater London and Buckinghamshire.

An unofficial status, the purple star-shaped flower with yellow stamens, the Pasqueflower is among endemic county flowers.

=== Geology ===
The rocks of Hertfordshire belong to the great shallow syncline known as the London Basin. The beds dip in a south-easterly direction towards the syncline's lowest point roughly under the River Thames. The most important formations are the Cretaceous Chalk, exposed as the high ground in the north and west of the county, forming the Chiltern Hills and the younger Palaeocene, Reading Beds and Eocene, London Clay which occupy the remaining southern part. The eastern half of the county was covered by glaciers during the Ice Age and has a superficial layer of glacial boulder clays.

=== Natural resources and environment ===
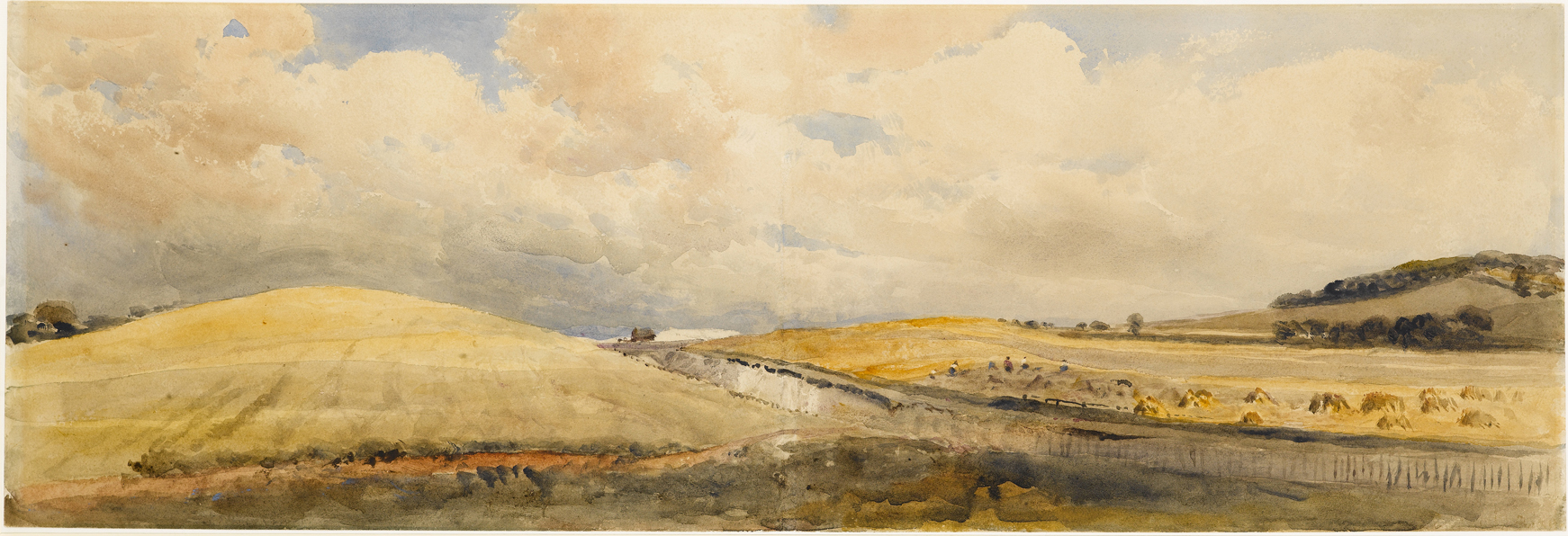
Peter de Wint, Cornfields near Tring Station, Hertfordshire, 1847, Princeton University Art Museum

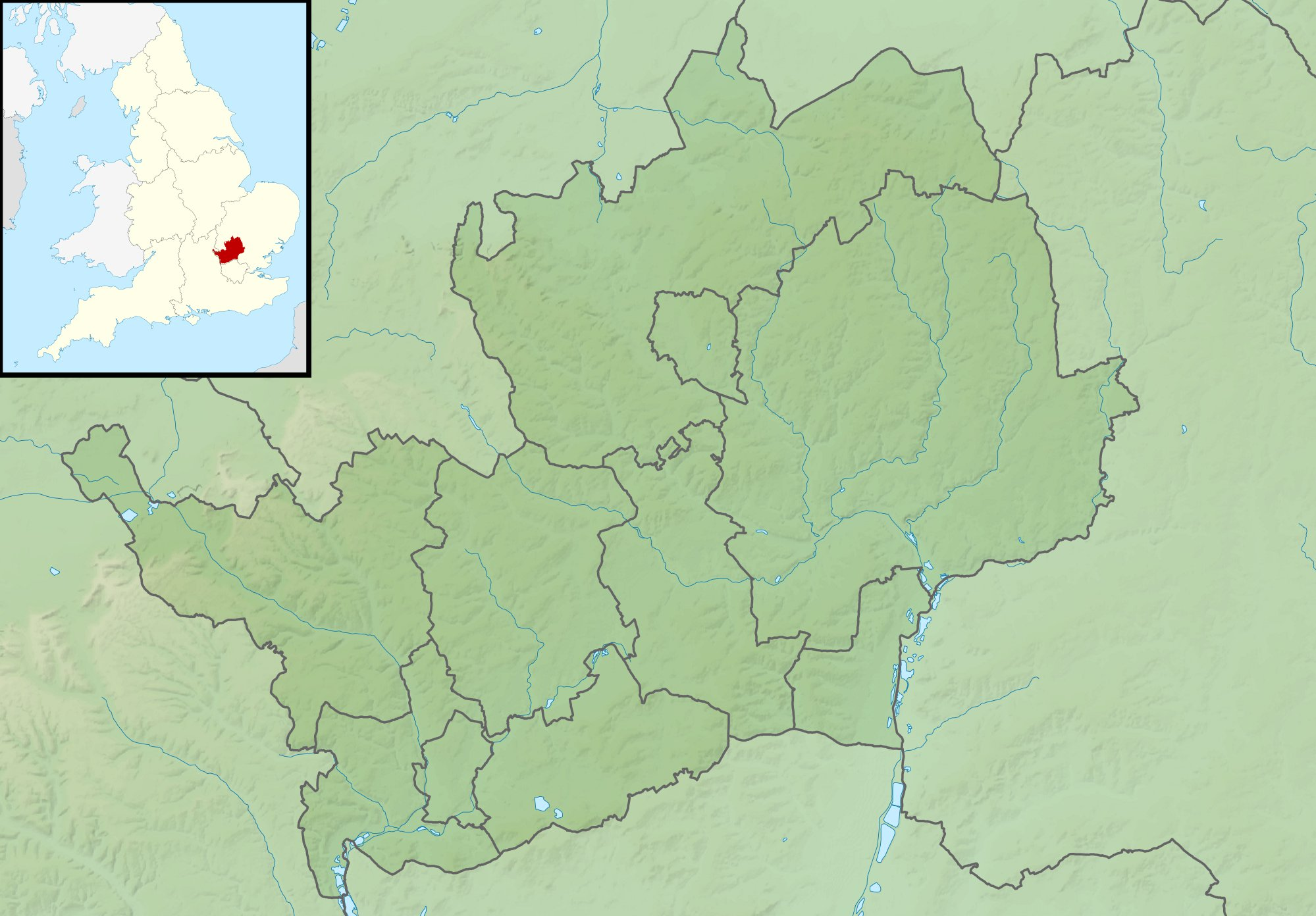
Relief map

Outside built-up areas in the west, and moreso in the east, there is diverse countryside. These range from beech woods of the Chilterns, clayland buffer zone countryside of Braughing and the Hadhams across to ancient hornbeam coppices west of the upper Lea valley. The county has sweeping panoramas of chalklands near Royston, Baldock, Hexton and Tring.

Large parts of the county are used for agriculture.

Some quarrying of sand and gravel occurs around St Albans. In the past, clay has supplied local brick-making and still does in Bovingdon, just south-west of Hemel Hempstead. The chalk that is the bedrock of much of the county provides an aquifer that feeds streams and is also exploited to provide water supplies for much of the county and beyond. Chalk has also been used as a building material and, once fired, the resultant lime was spread on agricultural land to improve fertility. The mining of chalk since the early 18th century has left unrecorded underground galleries that occasionally collapse unexpectedly and endanger buildings.

Fresh water is supplied to London from Ware, using the New River built by Hugh Myddleton and opened in 1613. Local rivers, although small, supported developing industries such as paper production at Nash Mills.

Hertfordshire affords habitat for a variety of flora and fauna. A bird once common in the shire is the hooded crow, the old name of which is the eponymous name of the regional newspaper, the Royston Crow published in Royston. A product, now largely defunct, was watercress, based in Hemel Hempstead and Berkhamsted supported by reliable, clean chalk rivers.

=== Urban areas ===
Main towns in Hertfordshire and environs

== Economy ==
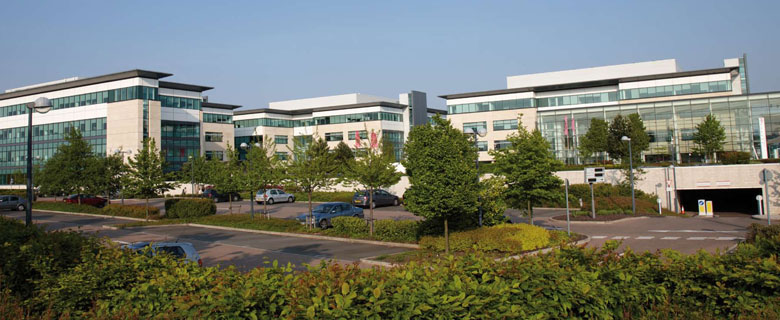
View of one of the buildings at Hatfield Business Park, currently the headquarters of EE

This is a table of trends of regional gross value added of Hertfordshire at current basic prices with figures in millions of British Pounds Sterling.

Year	Regional Gross Value Added (Note: Components may not sum to totals due to rounding)	Agriculture (Note: includes hunting and forestry)	Industry (Note: includes energy and construction)	Services (Note: includes financial intermediation services indirectly measured)
1995	11,742	96	3,292	8,354
2000	18,370	77	4,138	14,155
2003	20,937	82	4,348	16,507

Hertfordshire has the main operational and/or headquarters UK site of some very large employers. Clockwise from north:

In Stevenage (a subsidiary of: BAE Systems, Airbus and Finmeccanica) MBDA, develops missiles. In the same town, Airbus (Defence & Space Division) produces satellites.

Hatfield was where de Havilland developed the first commercial jet liner, the Comet. Now the site is a business park and new campus for the University of Hertfordshire. This major employment site notably hosts EE, Computacenter and Ocado groceries and other goods e-commerce.

Welwyn Garden City hosts Tesco's UK base, hosts the UK Cereal Partners factory and in pharmaceuticals it hosts Roche UK's headquarters (subsidiary of the Swiss Hoffman-La Roche). GlaxoSmithKline has plants in Ware and Stevenage.

Hemel Hempstead has large premises of Dixons Carphone.

The National Pharmacy Association (NPA), the trade association for UK pharmacies, is based in St Albans.

Kings Langley has the plant-office of Pure, making DAB digital radios.

Watford hosts national companies such as J D Wetherspoon, Camelot Group, Bathstore, and Caversham Finance (BrightHouse). It is also the UK base of multi-nationals Hilton Worldwide, TotalEnergies, TK Maxx, Costco, JJ Kavanagh and Sons, Vinci and Beko. The 2006 World Golf Championship and the 2013 Bilderberg Conference, took place at The Grove hotel. Warner Bros. owns and runs its main UK base since the 2000s, Warner Bros. Studios, in Leavesden, Watford.

Rickmansworth hosts Skanska.

== Media ==
=== Television ===
Most of the county is served by BBC London & ITV London, however Stevenage and North Hertfordshire is served by BBC East & ITV Anglia. Some northwestern parts of the county around Tring can also receive BBC South and ITV Meridian.

=== Radio ===
Local radio for the county is provided by BBC Three Counties Radio, BBC Radio Cambridgeshire (covering Royston), Heart Hertfordshire, Greatest Hits Radio Bucks, Beds and Herts (formerly Mix 96), Mix 92.6 (formerly Radio Verulam St. Albans) and Community Radio Dacorum (Hemel Hempstead).

=== Newspapers ===
Local newspapers in the county are:

- Hertfordshire Mercury (serving East and North Hertfordshire)
- The Comet (Stevenage and North Hertfordshire)
- Hemel Hempstead Gazette & Express (Hemel Hempstead, Berkhamsted and Tring)
- Watford Observer (for Watford)
- Welwyn Hatfield Times (serving Welwyn Garden City and Hatfield)

== Sport ==
=== Watersports ===
Waltham Cross, Broxbourne, is the location of the Lee Valley White Water Centre, a purpose-built venue opened in 2010 for the 2012 Summer Olympics. The site consists of two white water courses; one 300m Grade IV "Olympic" run; and one 160m Grade III "legacy" run.

During the games the center was the venue for the canoe and kayak slalom events.

Lee Valley has since hosted the ICF Canoe Slalom World Championships twice. First in 2015, and most recently in 2023, where Britain topped the medal table with 5 golds.

=== Football ===
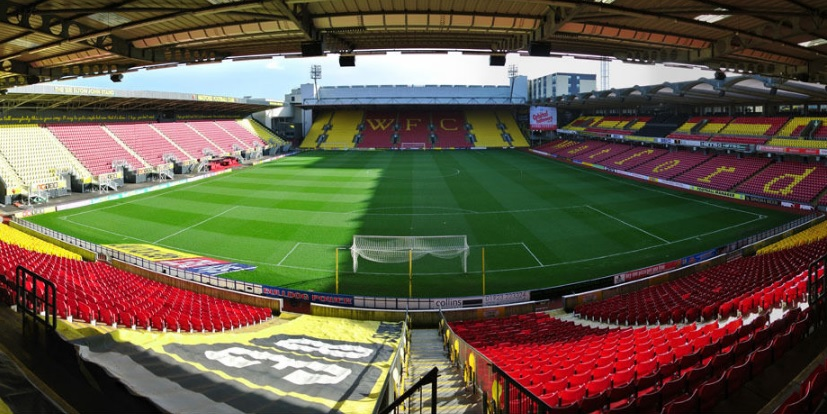
Vicarage Road stadium in Watford

As of the 2024–25 season, there are four professional football teams in Hertfordshire: Watford, Stevenage, Arsenal WFC and Boreham Wood

Watford have played their home games at Vicarage Road since 1922. The club joined the Football League in 1920 as a founding member of the Third Division and first played in the First Division of English football in 1982, finishing as runners-up to champions Liverpool. Watford was promoted to the Premier League at the end of the 2020–2021 season. After spending one season in the Premier League, they were relegated to the Championship again for the 2022–2023 season.

Stevenage F.C. was formed in 1976 as Stevenage Borough and have played at Broadhall Way since 1980. Stevenage was the first club to win a competitive match at the new Wembley Stadium, beating Kidderminster Harriers 3–2 in the 2007 FA Trophy Final. The club currently play in the EFL League One and have been managed by former player Alex Revell since February 2020.

Arsenal, whilst based at the Emirates Stadium in the London Borough of Islington, has long held a training ground in the county. Until 1999, it held the London Colney University of London facility, until it built a new purpose-built compound adjacent to it. Watford FC currently utilises the old Arsenal training area as its training facility.

Arsenal W.F.C. play at Meadow Park in Borehamwood. The club was formed in 1987 and have played in the FA Women's Super League since its inaugural season in 2011.

Hertfordshire has many semi-professional and amateur clubs. The highest placed are Boreham Wood, Hemel Hempstead Town and St Albans City, who all play in the National League South, the sixth tier of English football.

=== Rugby ===
==== Rugby league ====
Hemel Stags are a rugby league team based in Hemel Hempstead. Hemel Stags have played at Pennine Way Stadium since the club's founding in 1981. Until 2018, the club played in league 1, the third tier of the British rugby league system, and now compete in the Conference League South.

==== Rugby union ====
The Hertfordshire Rugby Football Union is the governing body for rugby union in Hertfordshire and is responsible for any interested parties involved in rugby.

Tring Rugby play matches at Cow Lane, Tring. The first XV currently play in the Regional 1 South East, League. A level 5 league.

=== GAA ===
Gaelic Football is played within Hertfordshire, with clubs from Oxfordshire all the way to Cambridge playing in the Hertfordshire League and Championship. Eire Óg, Oxford are the 2022 County Champions. Hurling is played by an amalgamated team, St Declan's CLG, with players contributed from all football teams across Hertfordshire. St Declan's currently play in the Warwickshire League and Championship, having previously played in the London GAA championship.

=== Netball ===
London Mavericks, previously Hertfordshire Mavericks and Saracens Mavericks, have competed in the Netball Super League since 2005. The franchise represents the East region and plays a number of home fixtures at the University of Hertfordshire sports village. Mavericks have appeared in the Netball Super League Grand Final seven times, winning the title in both 2008 and 2011.

Turnford Netball Club and Hatfield Netball Club are both netball teams from Hertfordshire which play in the England Netball Premier League, the highest level of club/amateur netball in the country.

== Landmarks ==
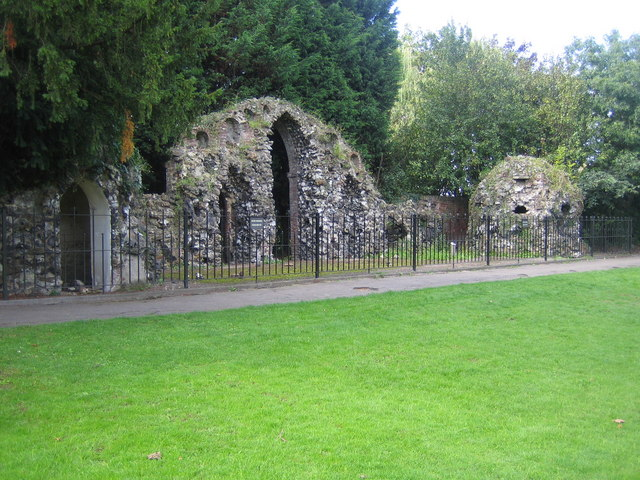
Cedars Park

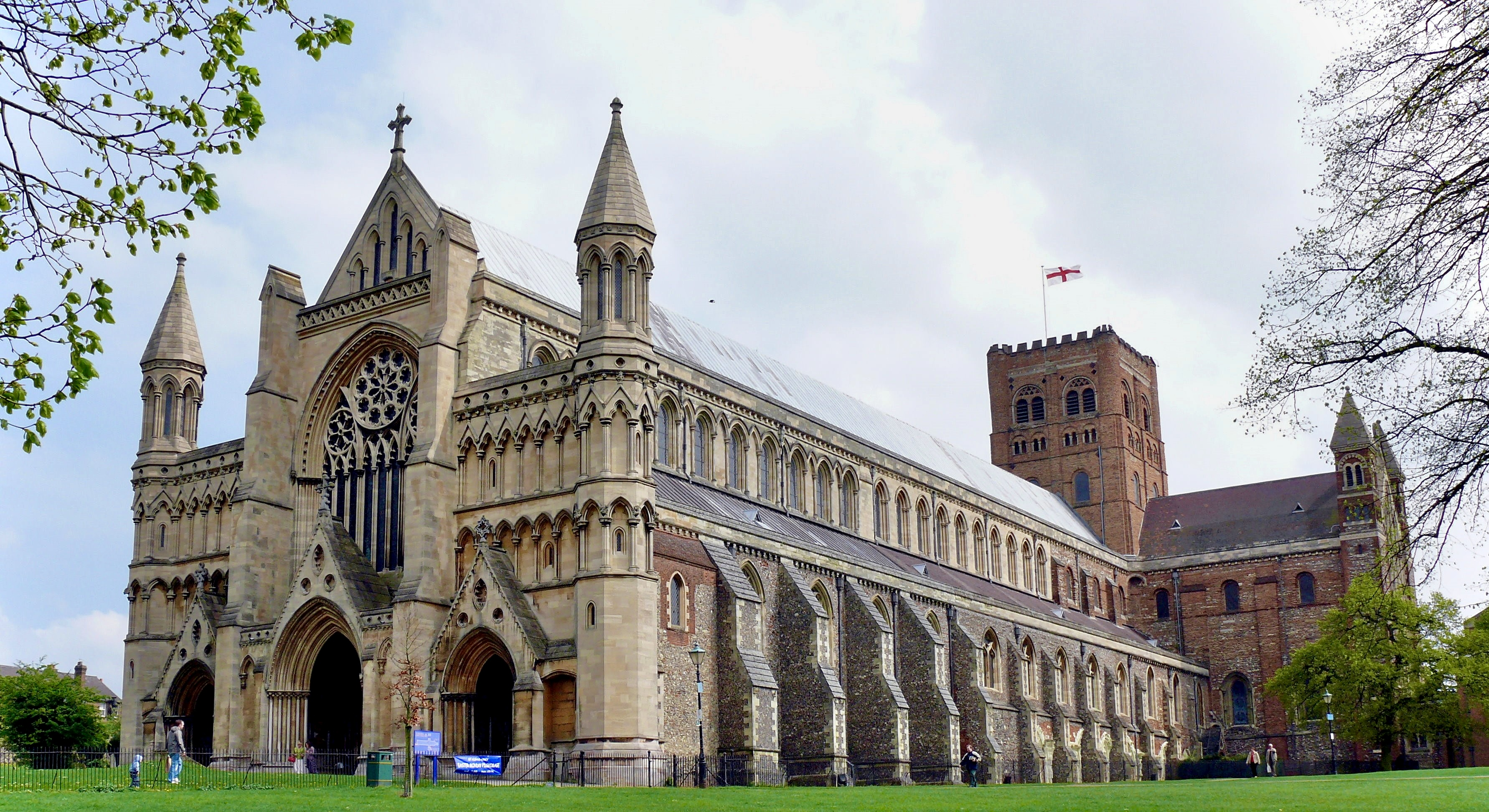
St Albans Abbey

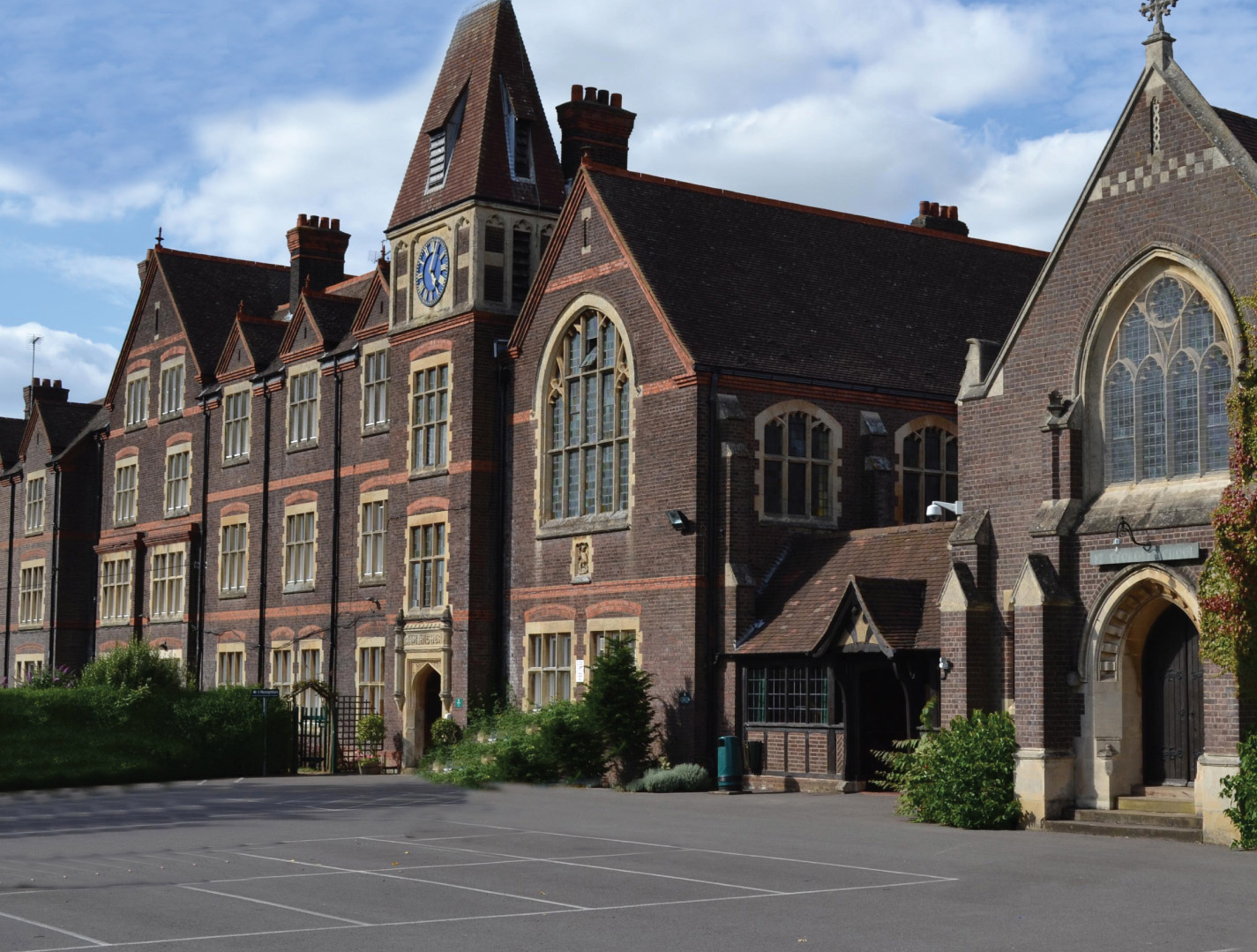
St George's School

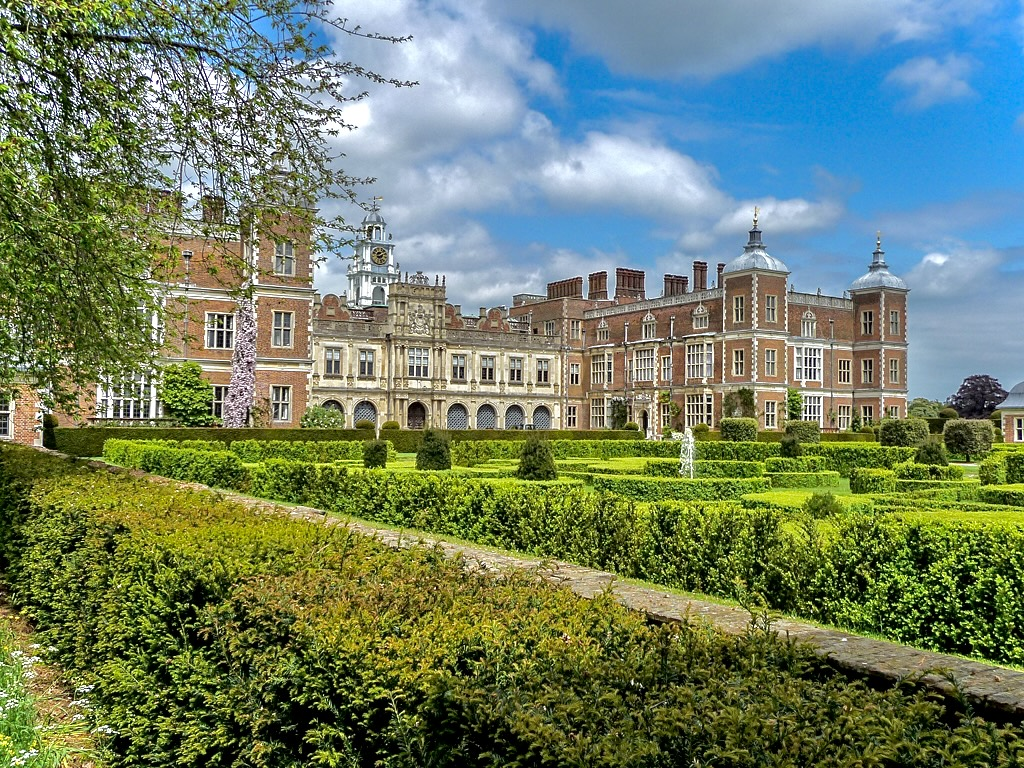
Hatfield House

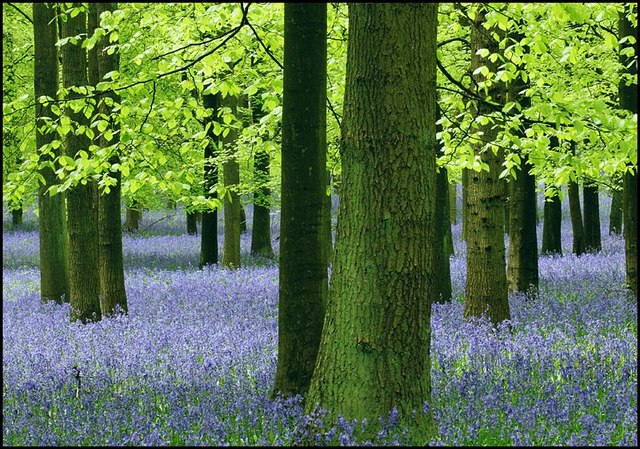
Bluebells in Dockey Wood

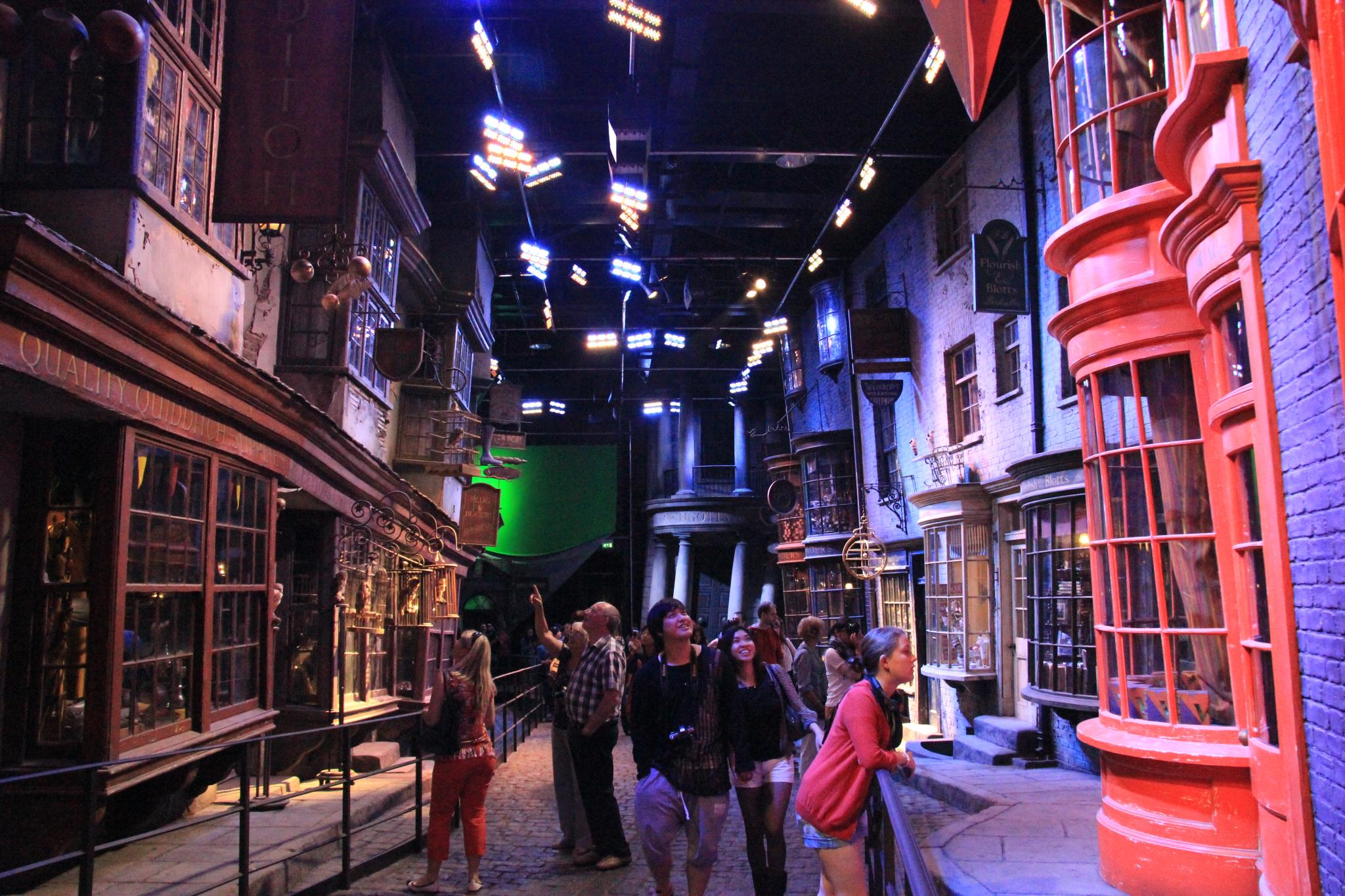
The Warner Bros. Making of Harry Potter Studio Tour at Leavesden

Below is a list of notable visitor attractions in Hertfordshire:

- Aldenham Country Park
- Ashridge – the estate surrounding the neo-Gothic house by James Wyatt (not open to the public) is National Trust land.
  - Bridgewater Monument, built in 1832 in memory of Francis Egerton, 3rd Duke of Bridgewater. 108 feet (33 m) tall and open to the public to ascend to the top
- Berkhamsted Castle
- Cedars Park, Broxbourne – historic park once the site of James I's favourite residence, Theobalds Palace. Maintained by Broxbourne Services and the Friends of Cedars Park.
- de Havilland Aircraft Heritage Centre, between London Colney and South Mimms
- Frogmore Paper Mill, Apsley
- Hatfield
  - Hatfield House – Jacobean house, gardens and park
  - Mill Green Watermill in Hatfield
  - University of Hertfordshire – a public research university based in Hatfield
- Henry Moore Foundation, Much Hadham – sculpture park on the work of Henry Moore
- Knebworth House, 250 acres (1.0 km^{2}) of country park, venue of many rock and pop festivals
- Leavesden Film Studios, home of the Warner Bros. Making of Harry Potter studio tour
- Letchworth Garden City – the world's first Garden City. Site of the first planned Green Belt, the UK's first roundabout, and a number of experiments in early town planning and house and factory design
  - Spirella Building
- Magic Roundabout (Hemel Hempstead) – a complex road junction
- Royston Cave – in Royston town centre
- Rye House Gatehouse in Hoddesdon (part of the Rye House Plot to assassinate King Charles II)
- St Albans
  - Beech Bottom Dyke – large-scale Iron Age defensive or boundary ditch
  - Redbournbury Watermill - 18th Century working flour mill and bakery
  - Sopwell Nunnery
  - St Albans Cathedral
  - Verulamium – Roman town remains, including museum of Roman life and the remains of a Roman amphitheatre
- Scott's Grotto, Ware
- Shaw's Corner, Ayot St Lawrence – home of George Bernard Shaw
- Stevenage – the first UK New Town
  - Six Hills Roman barrows site
- Therfield Heath – a local nature reserve in the north of the county
- Welwyn Roman Baths
- Welwyn Viaduct to the north of Welwyn Garden City
- Walter Rothschild Zoological Museum, Tring – a museum-annotated collection of dead mammals, birds, reptiles and insects
- Watford Museum, fine art and local artefacts

=== Main footpaths ===
- The Ridgeway
- Icknield Way
- Grand Union Canal Walk
- Harcamlow Way
- Hertfordshire Way
- Hertfordshire Chain Walk

== Local government ==
Local government in Hertfordshire is carried out by Hertfordshire County Council and ten lower-tier districts: North Hertfordshire, Stevenage, East Hertfordshire, Dacorum, St Albans, Welwyn Hatfield, Broxbourne, Three Rivers, Watford, and Hertsmere.

=== Future ===
In July 2026, the UK Government announced that it intends to reorganise Hertfordshire into four unitary authority areas by April 2028. These will cover the west, south-west, centre, and east of the county respectively.

West Hertfordshire will combine the current Dacorum and St Albans districts. South West Hertfordshire will combine the existing Hertsmere, Three Rivers, and Watford districts. Central Hertfordshire will combine the existing Stevenage district with the western part of North Hertfordshire and most of Welwyn Hatfield. The new East Hertfordshire and Broxbourne will combine the existing Broxbourne and East Hertfordshire districts with the eastern part of North Hertfordshire and the south-east of Welwyn Hatfield.

Elections to the new unitary authorities will take place in May 2027.

== Transport ==
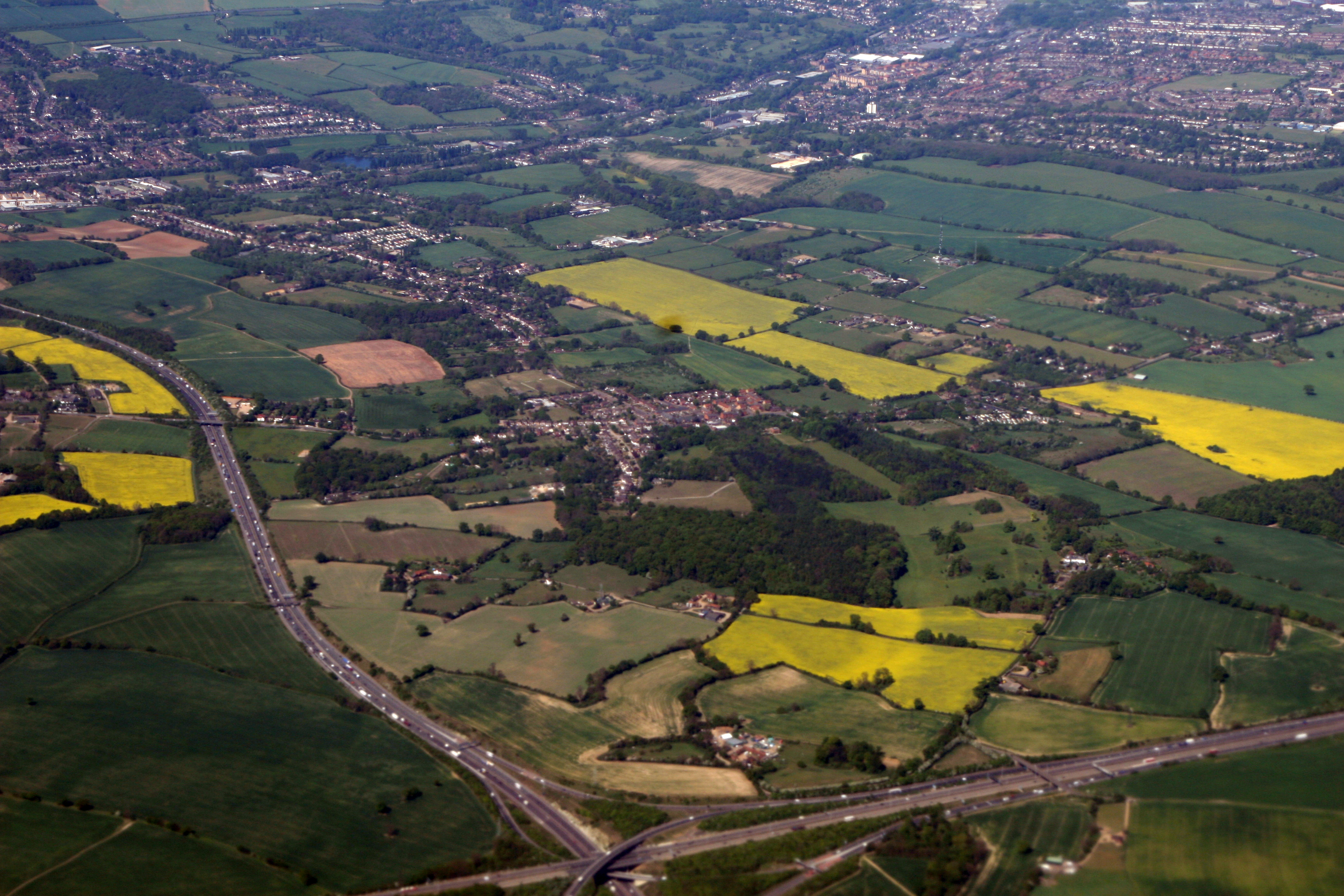
Junction of the M1 and M25 near Hemel Hempstead

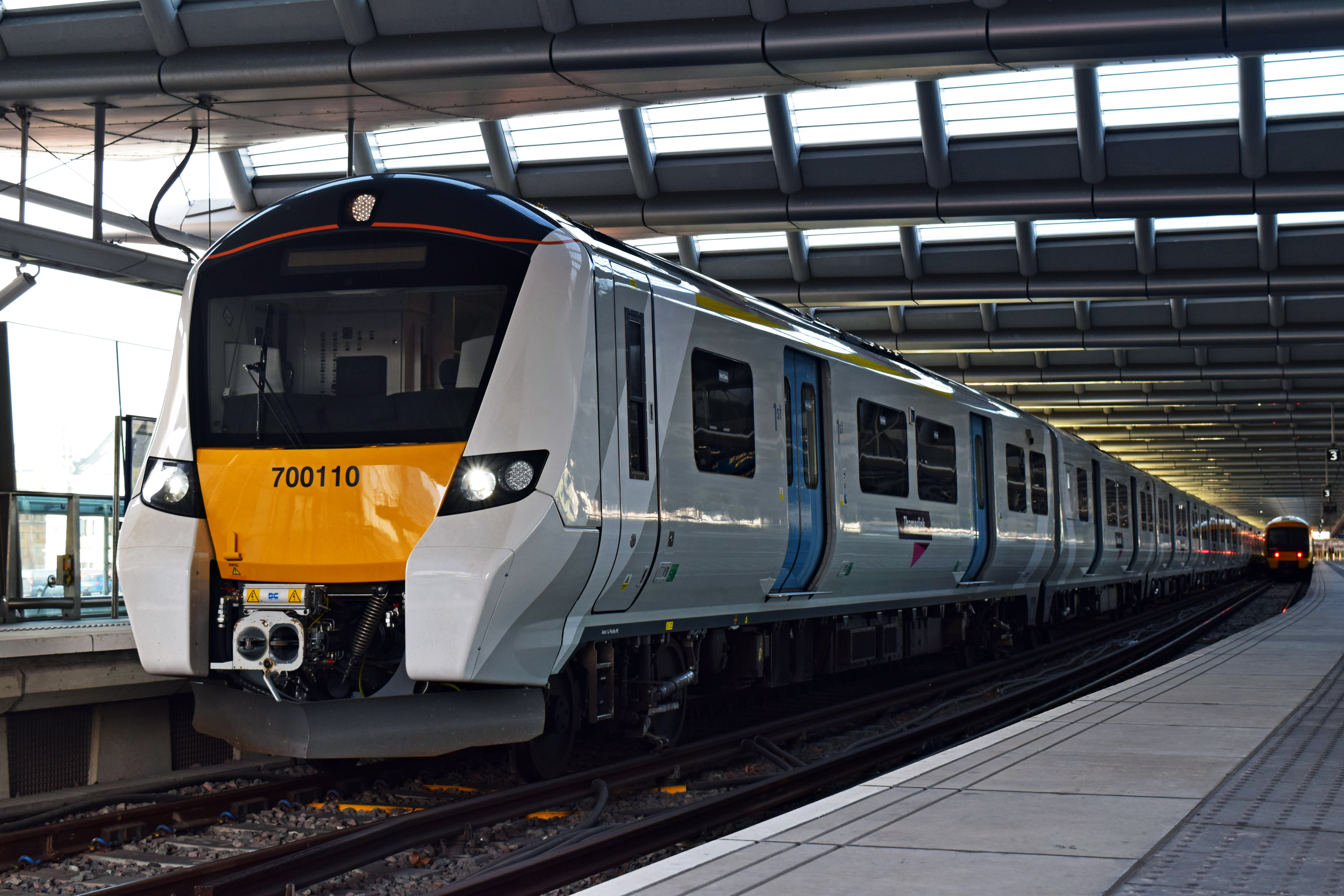
Greater Thameslink Railway provide frequent train services through Hertfordshire on the Midland Main Line and East Coast Main Line.

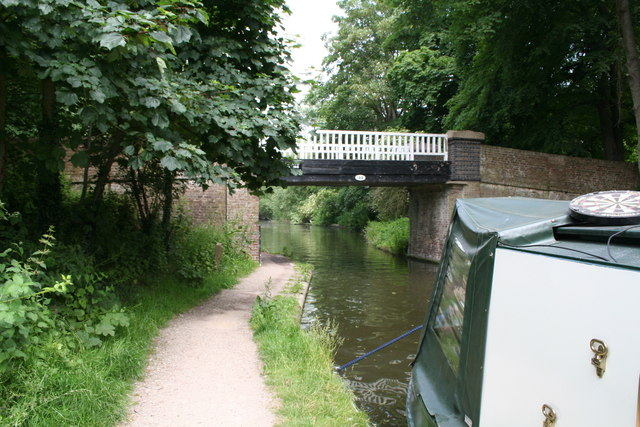
Bridge 168 on the Grand Union Canal

Hertfordshire is a home county with many towns forming part of the London commuter belt and has some of the principal roads in England including the A1, A1(M), A41, A414, M1, M11, and the M25.

Four principal national railway lines pass through the county:

- the West Coast Main Line from Euston. Avanti West Coast operates high speed intercity services via Watford Junction to the Midlands, North Wales, the North West England and Scotland. West Midlands Trains provides local commuter and regional services.
- the East Coast Main Line from London King's Cross. Local commuter and regional services are provided by Greater Thameslink Railway. London North Eastern Railway runs high speed intercity services via Stevenage to the east coast of Northern England and Scotland
- the Midland Main Line which forms part of the Thameslink route between Bedford and Brighton via Central London with services are provided by Greater Thameslink Railway. East Midlands Railway provide intercity services along the line from London St Pancras to the East Midlands and Yorkshire
- the West Anglia Main Line from London Liverpool Street. Local commuter and regional services are provided by Greater Anglia mainly in the east of the county

A number of other local rail routes also cross Hertfordshire:

- the London–Aylesbury line from London Marylebone runs via Rickmansworth and Chorleywood
- the Abbey Line, a local line from Watford to St Albans Abbey
- the Cambridge line, a branch of the East Coast line which runs via Royston and Letchworth to Cambridge

Three commuter lines operated by Transport for London enter the county:

- The Weaver line, a suburban metro line from Liverpool Street to Cheshunt via Seven Sisters
- The Lioness line, a suburban metro line from Euston to Watford Junction
- Five stations on the London Underground Metropolitan line

The distance travelled by buses in Hertfordshire has reduced by 56.5% since 2017.

Stansted Airport and Luton Airport are both within 10 miles (16 km) of the county's borders in Essex and Bedfordshire, respectively. The commercial airfield at Elstree is for light aircraft.

The Grand Union Canal passes through Rickmansworth, Watford, Hemel Hempstead, Berkhamsted and Tring.

== Education ==
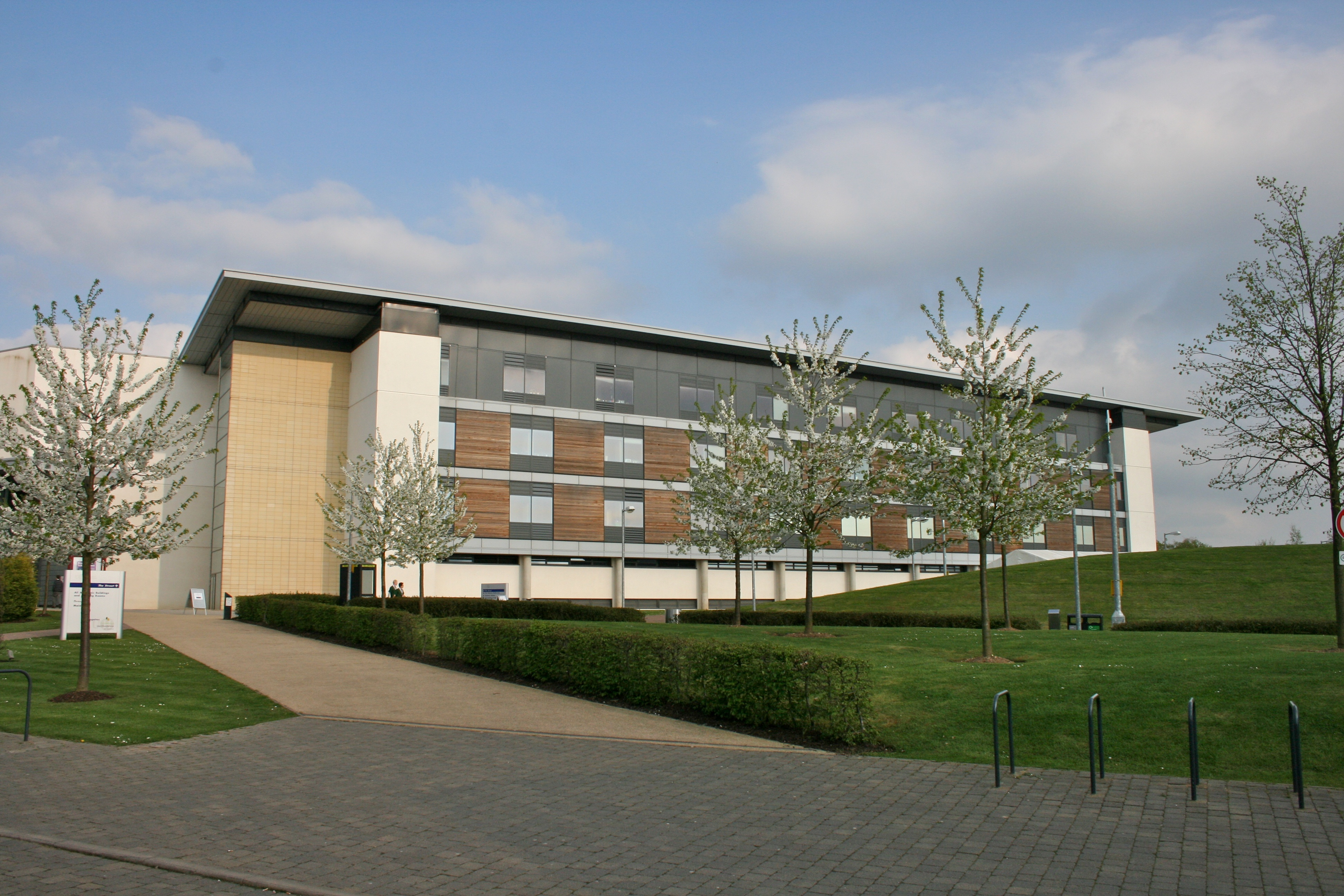
University of Hertfordshire

Hertfordshire has 26 independent schools and 73 state secondary schools.

The state secondary schools are entirely comprehensive, although 7 schools in the south and southwest of the county are partially selective (see Education in Watford). All state schools have sixth forms, and there are no sixth form colleges. The tertiary colleges, each with multiple campuses, are Hertford Regional College, North Hertfordshire College, Oaklands College and West Herts College. The University of Hertfordshire is a modern university based largely in Hatfield. It has more than 23,000 students.

== Literature ==
Hertfordshire is the location of Jack Worthing's country house in Oscar Wilde's play The Importance of Being Earnest.

Jane Austen's novel Pride and Prejudice is primarily set in Hertfordshire.

The location of Mr Jarndyce's Bleak House in Charles Dickens's Bleak House is near St Albans.

The eponymous residence in E. M. Forster's novel Howards End was based on Rooks Nest House just outside Stevenage.

George Orwell based Animal Farm on Wallington, Hertfordshire, where he lived between 1936 and 1940. Manor Farm and The Great Barn both feature in the novel.

== See also ==
- Lord Lieutenant of Hertfordshire
- High Sheriff of Hertfordshire
- Custos Rotulorum of Hertfordshire – Keeper of the Rolls
- Hertfordshire (UK Parliament constituency) – Historical list of MPs for Hertfordshire constituency
- List of English and Welsh endowed schools (19th century)#Hertfordshire
- List of Jewish communities in Hertfordshire
- Hertfordshire GAA
- The Hundred Parishes
