= West Hertfordshire (district) =

- Proposed unitary authority area
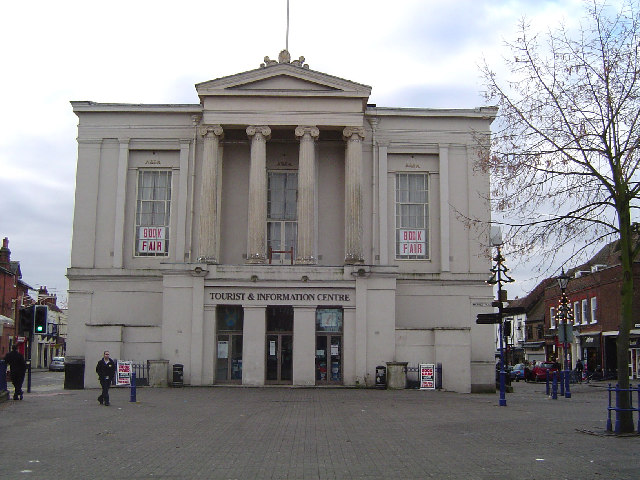
- St Albans Town Hall

- Interactive map
- Coordinates: 51.7521°N 0.3390°W
- Sovereign state: United Kingdom
- Country: England
- Region: East of England
- Ceremonial county: Hertfordshire

Government
  - Type: Unitary authority
  - Body: West Hertfordshire Council

Area
  - Total: 81.65 sq mi (211.46 km^{2})

Population (2024 estimate)
  - Total: 312,432
- Time zone: UTC+0 (GMT)
  - Summer (DST): UTC+1 (BST)

West Hertfordshire or North West Hertfordshire was a proposed unitary authority area in the ceremonial county of Hertfordshire, England. It was planned to be formed on 1 April 2028, with elections planned to take place in May 2027 to a shadow authority. The largest settlement would have been Hemel Hempstead and it would have also included Berkhamsted, Harpenden, St Albans, and Tring. The area has a 2024 estimated population of 312,432. Plans to create it were halted in September 2026 and the 2027 election was cancelled. In October 2026, plans to create it were withdrawn.

== Formation ==
It would have been formed from the Dacorum and St Albans districts. Hemel Hempstead and St Albans are currently unparished, the rest of the area is parished. The St Albans district currently holds city status, and its district council has considered maintaining this by either establishment of charter trustees, or a civil parish for St Albans.

The district is being formed as part of ongoing local government changes throughout England, in which all areas of the country that have separate county councils and district councils will see those replaced with single-tier, or unitary, local governance. The alternative proposals for two unitaries and three unitaries were not accepted.

In September 2026, the Hertfordshire proposals were halted by the government and placed under review. In October 2026, plans to create it were withdrawn. The decision was threatened with judicial review by Hertfordshire County Council.

== Governance ==
It would have been run by West Hertfordshire Council, which would have comprised 84 councillors.
