= South West Hertfordshire (district) =

- Proposed unitary authority area
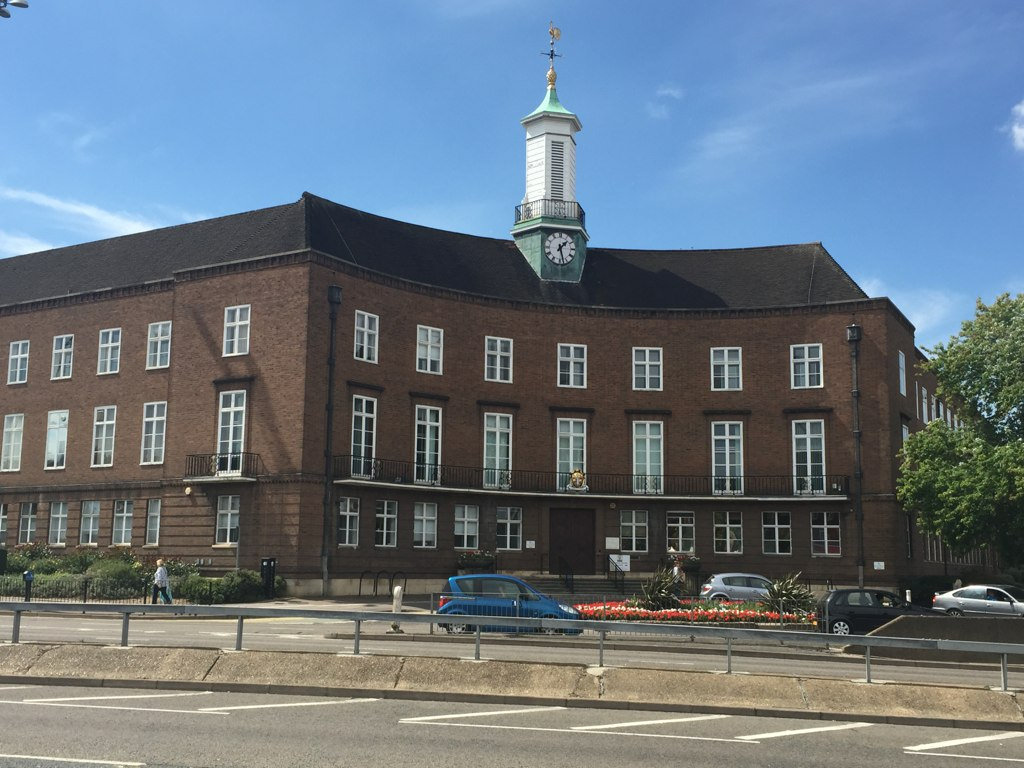
- Watford Town Hall

- Interactive map
- Coordinates: 51.6590°N 0.4033°W
- Sovereign state: United Kingdom
- Country: England
- Region: East of England
- Ceremonial county: Hertfordshire

Government
  - Type: Unitary authority
  - Body: South West Hertfordshire Council

Area
  - Total: 81.65 sq mi (211.46 km^{2})

Population (2024 estimate)
  - Total: 313,190
- Time zone: UTC+0 (GMT)
  - Summer (DST): UTC+1 (BST)

South West Hertfordshire was a proposed unitary authority area in the ceremonial county of Hertfordshire, England.

It was planned to be formed on 1 April 2028, with shadow elections to the new authority planned to take place in May 2027. The largest settlement would have been Watford and it would also have included Abbots Langley, Bushey, Borehamwood, Chorleywood, Maple Cross, Potters Bar, Radlett and Rickmansworth. Most of the district is part of the Greater London Built-up Area, but is outside the Greater London administrative area. The area has a 2024 estimated population of 313,190.

Plans to create it were halted in September 2026 and the 2027 election was cancelled. In October 2026, plans to create it were withdrawn.

== Formation ==
It would have been formed from the Hertsmere, Three Rivers and Watford districts. Bushey, Maple Cross, Potters Bar, Watford, and an area near Loudwater are currently unparished, the rest of the area is parished. The establishment of charter trustees to maintain civic identity in Hertsmere was considered and rejected by the district council's cabinet.

The district was being formed as part of ongoing local government changes throughout England, in which all areas of the country that have separate county councils and district councils would see those replaced with single-tier, or unitary, local governance. The chosen proposal was supported by Hertsmere's district council. Alternative proposals for Hertfordshire were a two unitary east/west split for the entire county, and a three-unitary proposal that was backed by Watford and Three Rivers district councils, which would have split the three districts east/west.

In September 2026, the Hertfordshire proposals were halted by the government and placed under review. In October 2026, plans to create it were withdrawn. The decision was threatened with judicial review by Hertfordshire County Council.

== Governance ==
It would have been run by South West Hertfordshire Council, which would have comprised 79 councillors.
