= List of Oxfordshire boundary changes =

Boundary changes affecting the English county of Oxfordshire.

Date	Legislation	Effect
20 October 1844	Counties (Detached Parts) Act 1844	Little Faringdon transferred from Berkshire; Shilton (part) transferred from Berkshire; Caversfield†, (part of) Stratton Audley (Note: The parish of Stratton Audley was partly in Buckinghamshire and partly in Oxfordshire until 1844.) and Studley (Note: The hamlet of Studley formed part of the parish of Beckley, the remainder of which was in Oxfordshire.) transferred from Buckinghamshire; Ackhampstead‡ , (Note: Ackhampstead was a detached part of Oxfordshire within the Parish of Lewknor.) Lillingstone Lovell and Boycott‡ (Note: The township of Boycott was part of the parish of Stowe, otherwise in Buckinghamshire.) transferred to Buckinghamshire; Great Lemhill Farm (in the parish of Broughton Poggs) transferred to Gloucestershire; The parish of Shenington transferred from Gloucestershire; The parish of Widford transferred from Gloucestershire
1889	Local Government Act 1888	Grandpont and New Hinksey transferred from Berkshire
1895	Local Government Act 1894	Caversham transferred to Berkshire; Mollington (part) transferred from Warwickshire
25 March 1896	Local Government Board Provisional Order Confirmation (No.14) Act	The parish of Stokenchurch transferred to Buckinghamshire; Cadmore End and Studdridge (detached parts of the parish of Lewknor) transferred to Buckinghamshire; Ibstone (part) transferred to Buckinghamshire
1 April 1933	Ministry of Health Provisional Order Confirmation (Buckingham and Oxford) Act 1933	Towersey transferred from Buckinghamshire; Kingsey transferred to Buckinghamshire
5 June 1956	Ministry of Health and Local Government Declaration	Exchanged areas with Buckinghamshire along changed watercourse
26 October 1956	Ministry of Health and Local Government Declaration	Exchanged areas with Buckinghamshire along changed watercourse
1 April 1974	Local Government Act 1972	Abingdon, Didcot, Wallingford, Wantage and environs transferred from Berkshire (see List of places transferred from Berkshire to Oxfordshire in 1974)
1 April 1977		Mapledurham (part), Emmer Green (part), Caversham Park Village and Micklands Estate transferred to Berkshire
1 April 1991	The Berkshire, Buckinghamshire, Hampshire, Oxfordshire and Surrey (County Boundaries) Order 1991	Exchanges with Berkshire (16 hectares); Exchanged unpopulated areas with Buckinghamshire

== Notes ==
† These areas were entirely detached from the remainder of Buckinghamshire.
‡ Detached part of Oxfordshire surrounded by Buckinghamshire
