= List of Buckinghamshire boundary changes =

Boundary changes affecting the English county of Buckinghamshire.

Date	Legislation	Effect
20 October 1844	Counties (Detached Parts) Act 1844	Caversfield†, (part of) Stratton Audley (Note: The parish of Stratton Audley was partly in Buckinghamshire and partly in Oxfordshire until 1844.) and Studley (Note: The hamlet of Studley formed part of the parish of Beckley, the remainder of which was in Oxfordshire.) transferred to Oxfordshire; Luffield Abbey (part) transferred to Northamptonshire (Note: The extra-parochial place of Luffield Abbey was partly in Buckinghamshire and partly in Northamptonshire. In 1844 the part in the latter county was transferred to the Northamptonshire parish of Silverstone so that Luffield Abbey was entirely within Buckinghamshire thereafter.); Ackhampstead† (Note: The chapelry of Ackhampstead was a detached part of Oxfordshire within the Parish of Lewknor.), Lillingstone Lovell and Boycott‡ (Note: The township of Boycott was part of the parish of Stowe, otherwise in Buckinghamshire.) transferred from Oxfordshire; Coleshill§ (Note: Part the hamlet of Coleshill was a detached part of Hertfordshire. The hamlet was part of the parish of Amersham, otherwise in Buckinghamshire.) (part) from Hertfordshire
25 March 1883	Local Government Board Order 19622	Parts of Drayton Beauchamp and Marsworth transferred to Tring, Hertfordshire
24 March 1884	Local Government Board Orders 15986, 15987	Part of Biddlesden transferred to Syresham, Northamptonshire
25 March 1885	Local Government Board Order 16585	The Hudnall area of the parish of Edlesborough transferred to the parish of Little Gaddesden, Hertfordshire
25 March 1888	Local Government Board Order 21701	Part of Marsworth transferred to Puttenham, Hertfordshire.
30 September 1895	Local Government Board Provisional Order 1170	The parish of Nettleden (including an area transferred from Ivinghoe (Note: The remainder of Ivinghoe remained in Buckinghamshire.)) transferred to Little Gaddesden, Hertfordshire.
25 March 1896	Local Government Board Provisional Order Confirmation (No.14) Act	The parish of Stokenchurch transferred from Oxfordshire to Buckinghamshire; Cadmore End and Studdridge (detached parts of the parish of Lewknor) transferred from Oxfordshire; Ibstone (part) transferred from Oxfordshire
1 October 1900	Local Government Board Order 41337	Parts of the Buckinghamshire parish of Ashley Green exchanged with parts of parishes of Bovingdon and Northchurch, Hertfordshire.
1 April 1907	The Counties of Buckingham and Hertford (Alteration of County Boundaries) Order 1906	Part of Bovingdon, Hertfordshire transferred to Latimer, Buckinghamshire; Parts of the parish of Chalfont St Peter transferred to Chorleywood, part exchanged with area in parish of Rickmansworth Rural, both in Hertfordshire; Part of Chenies transferred to Chorleywood, Hertfordshire; Denham exchanged areas with Rickmansworth rural, Hertfordshire; Parts of Hawridge transferred to Northchurch, Wigginton, Hertfordshire; Latimer exchanged areas with Flaunden, Hertfordshire; Part of Little Gaddesden transferred from Hertfordshire to Edlesborough; Part of Rickmansworth Rural, Hertfordshire transferred to Gerrards Cross
1 April 1933	Ministry of Health Provisional Order Confirmation (Buckingham and Oxford) Act 1933	Towersey transferred to Oxfordshire; Kingsey transferred from Oxfordshire
5 June 1956	Ministry of Health and Local Government Declaration	Exchanged areas with Oxfordshire along changed watercourse
26 October 1956	Ministry of Health and Local Government Declaration	Exchanged areas with Oxfordshire along changed watercourse
21 December 1956	Ministry of Health and Local Government Declaration	Exchanged areas with Bedfordshire along changed watercourse
1 April 1965	The Counties of Bedford and Buckingham (Leighton-Linslade) Order 1965	Linslade (Note: Linslade Urban District was merged with Leighton Buzzard Urban District in Bedfordshire, to form Leighton-Linslade Urban District in the latter county.) transferred to Bedfordshire
1 April 1974	Local Government Act 1972	Slough and environs transferred to Berkshire See list of places transferred below.
1 April 1991	The Buckinghamshire, Hertfordshire, Northamptonshire and Oxfordshire (County Boundaries) Order 1991	Exchanged outlying areas of Chenies and Ashley Green with Hertfordshire; Exchanged unpopulated areas with Northamptonshire; Exchanged unpopulated areas with Oxfordshire
1 April 1991	The Bedfordshire, Buckinghamshire and Cambridgeshire (County Boundaries) Order 1991	Exchanged outlying areas of Astwood, North Crawley and Wavendon with Bedfordshire
1 April 1995	The Berkshire, Buckinghamshire and Surrey (County Boundaries) Order 1994	Colnbrook transferred to Berkshire

== List of places transferred from Buckinghamshire to Berkshire in 1974 ==
- Britwell (Note: The Britwell ward of Burnham parish was transferred to Berkshire to become the new parish of Britwell.)
- Burnham (part)
- Chalvey
- Cippenham
- Datchet
- Ditton
- Ditton Park
- Eton
- Eton Wick
- Horton
- Huntercombe
- Langley
- Salt Hill
- Slough
- Upton
- Wexham (part) (Note: The part of the parish of Wexham transferred to Berkshire was formed into a new parish of Wexham Court.)
- Wraysbury

== Notes ==
† These areas were entirely detached from the remainder of Buckinghamshire.
‡ Detached part of Oxfordshire surrounded by Buckinghamshire
§ Detached part of Hertfordshire surrounded by Buckinghamshire
