= List of Worcestershire boundary changes =

Worcestershire is a historic, ceremonial, and (except in the period 1972–1998) administrative county of England. Since 1998 it is classified as a non-metropolitan county.

Date	Legislation	Effect
20 October 1844	Counties (Detached Parts) Act 1844	Transferred Icomb and the hamlets of Alstone and Little Washbourne (both in the parish of Overbury) to Gloucestershire Transferred Broom and Clent from Staffordshire, the townships of Halesowen, Cakemore, Hasbury, Hawne, Hill, Illey, Lapal, Ridgacre, Hunnington, Oldbury and Romsley (all in the parish of Halesowen) from Shropshire and the chapelry of Rochford (in the parish of Tenbury) from Gloucestershire
1 October 1891		The Balsall Heath district, which had constituted the most northerly part of the Parish of King's Norton, was added to the County Borough of Birmingham, and for the purposes of the Local Government Act 1888 was thereafter deemed to be in the Administrative County of Warwick.
1893		Transferred Edvin Loach (a detached part) to Herefordshire
9 November 1909		Quinton Urban District was formally removed from Worcestershire and incorporated into the County Borough of Birmingham, and therefore into Warwickshire.
9 November 1911	LGB Provisional Order 1910 Confirmation (No. 13) Act, 1911	The Rural District of Yardley and the greater part of the Urban District of King's Norton and Northfield (which included most of Bartley Reservoir) were absorbed into the County Borough of Birmingham, and thereby became part of Warwickshire.
1 April 1931	Provisional Orders Confirmation (Gloucestershire Warwickshire and Worcestershire) Act, 1931	The town of Shipston-on-Stour and the parishes of Alderminster, Tidmington and Tredington ceded to Warwickshire. Redmarley D'Abitot, Staunton, Blockley, Daylesford and Evenlode parishes ceded to Gloucestershire
1 April 1966	The West Midlands Order, 1965	The Staffordshire towns of Smethwick and Rowley Regis were added, as components of the newly formed borough of Warley. Dudley was ceded to Staffordshire.
1 April 1974	Local Government Act 1972	Halesowen and Stourbridge were ceded to Dudley, which became part of the newly formed West Midlands county, as did Birmingham. The rest of Worcestershire became part of Hereford and Worcester.
Interregnum
1 April 1998	The Hereford and Worcester (Structural, Boundary and Electoral Changes) Order 1996	Herefordshire and Worcestershire re-established as two separate counties.

- On 1 April 1995 the Hereford and Worcester and West Midlands (County Boundaries) Order 1993 transferred part of the parish of Frankley (including the remaining south-west part of Bartley Reservoir) from Hereford and Worcester to Birmingham to become part of the West Midlands county. The area in question becoming the civil parish of New Frankley in 2000.

== See also ==
- Evolution of Worcestershire county boundaries
- List of boundary changes in the West Midlands (region)
