= Detached parts of Shropshire =

Shropshire exclave of Halesowen and Oldbury

Coordinates: 52.45°N 2.06°W

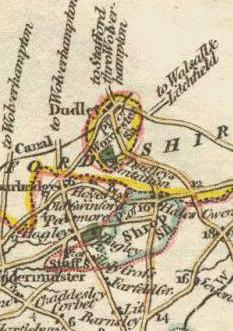
Map of Shropshire (Detached) marked as blue

Between the late 11th century and 1844, the English county of Shropshire (or Salop) possessed a large exclave within the present-day Black Country and surrounding area. This territory was gained from neighbouring Worcestershire, and the exclave's border corresponded with the medieval Manor of Hala (or Halas, Hales). Shropshire contained the townships of (what are now known as) Halesowen, Oldbury, Warley Salop, Ridgacre, Hunnington, Romsley and Langley. The exceptions were Cradley, Lutley and Warley Wigorn, which were exclaves or enclaves still aligned with the original county. Bounded entirely by Staffordshire and Worcestershire, Hala was part of Brimstree hundred, and totally detached from the rest of Shropshire. Bridgnorth, the nearest town within the main body of Shropshire, is 16.8 miles (27.03 km) away from Halesowen, whilst the county town of Shrewsbury is 34.6 miles (55.62 km) away.

In 1844, following enactment of the Counties (Detached Parts) Act 1844, these parts of Shropshire were reunited with Worcestershire and remained within that county until 1974. Halesowen and Oldbury are currently part of the West Midlands metropolitan county.

== History ==
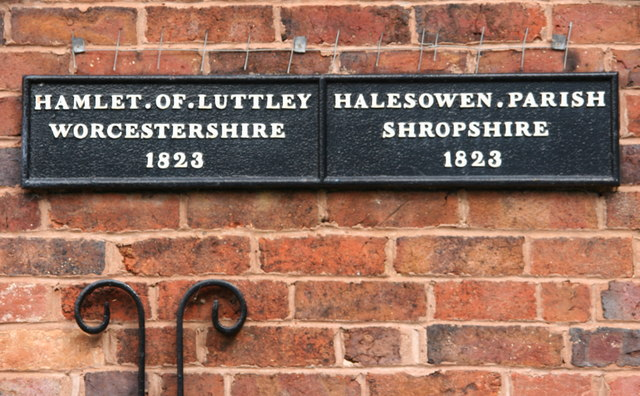
The old Worcestershire-Shropshire border is still marked at Lutley.

Prior to the Norman Conquest of England in 1066, the Manor of Hala formed a northerly arm of the fledgling county of Worcestershire, within the hundred of Clent. By the time of the Domesday Book in 1086, the manor was listed as under the control of Roger de Montgomerie, first Earl of Shrewsbury and his ally 'Roger the Huntsman', although integration into Shropshire had not yet taken place. The Domesday Book also states that the Earl had an estate within the manor, with "four ploughs at work on his home farm and 36 tenant farmers cultivating the remaining land with 41 ploughs between them. He also had a separate estate in Halesowen, leased to Roger the Huntsman, who had one plough on his own farm and six sub-tenants employing five more ploughs" As a close ally of the King, the Earl of Shrewsbury was granted most of Hala by William the Conqueror, although the remainder of the land was gifted to others, such as Ansculf de Picquigny (his son William Fitz-Ansculf inherited the land). De Picquigny was a French baron who became Sheriff of Buckinghamshire and founded the Barony of Dudley to administrate his lands across eleven counties of England. Warley was divided into two; the Barony of Dudley's lands were known as Warley Wigorn (Warley Worcestershire) and remained in Worcestershire, whilst Earl Roger's segments became integrated into Shropshire, known as Warley Salop (Warley Shropshire).

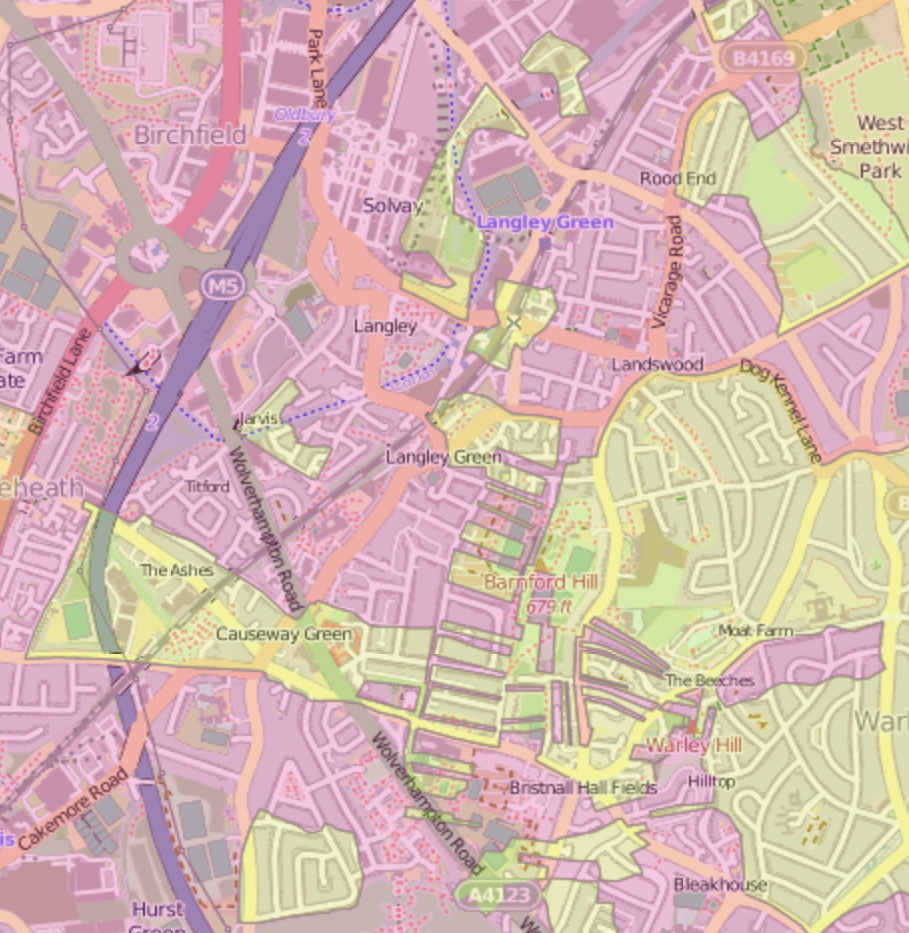
Part of the complex boundary of Warley Wigorn (in green) and Warley Salop.

Cradley was also a possession of the Barony of Dudley and thus remained in its original county, along with the hamlet of Lutley which was held by the Canons of Wolverhampton.

The Shropshire territories of the Manor remained in the hands of Earl Roger's descendants until 1102, when Robert de Belesme led an unsuccessful rebellion against Henry I and Hala was confiscated by the Crown as a consequence. Henry II gave the Manor to his half-sister Emma who had married Dafydd ab Owain Gwynedd in 1174. She restored it to Richard I, although her son Owen still had claims on it. The Manor's name was altered to Hales Owen in the 1270s.

== Counties (Detached Parts) Act 1844 ==
The Counties (Detached Parts) Act 1844 was an act of Parliament which abolished many of the exclaves of counties in England and Wales for civil purposes. The precursor to this legislation was the Reform Act 1832 and Parliamentary Boundaries Act 1832, which redefined the boundaries for Members of Parliament. These acts changed the status of many exclaves and enclaves, thus starting the process of incorporating these 'outliers' into their surrounding county. Halesowen was to be incorporated into Worcestershire for parliamentary purposes, although the justices of the peace of Shropshire still held jurisdiction until 1844. The Counties (Detached Parts) Act 1844 placed all of what was the medieval Halesowen parish back into Worcestershire, under the 'Lower' division of Halfshire hundred. Warley Wigorn was unified with Warley Salop to form the new parish of Warley in 1884.

== Modern local government era ==
In 1889; Halesowen and Oldbury formed part of the new administrative county of Worcester, due to enactment of the Local Government Act 1888. The county retained Halesowen (and Oldbury through the County Borough of Warley) until adoption of the Local Government Act 1972, which established the metropolitan county of West Midlands in April 1974. Dudley County Borough along with Stourbridge and Halesowen formed Dudley Metropolitan District (later to become Dudley Metropolitan Borough), whilst Warley County Borough merged with West Bromwich to create Sandwell. The 'top tier' West Midlands County Council was abolished in April 1986 via enactment of the Local Government Act 1985. Romsley, Hunnington and Frankley are part of the administrative Worcestershire, within the Bromsgrove District.

== See also ==
- Evolution of Worcestershire county boundaries
- History of Shropshire
- History of the West Midlands
- History of Worcestershire
- List of county exclaves in England and Wales 1844–1974
- List of Worcestershire boundary changes
