= Halesowen (medieval parish) =

Coordinates: 52.45°N 2.05°W

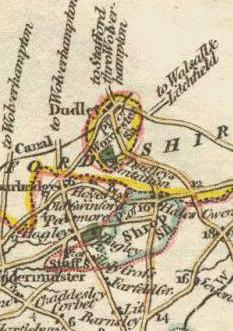
This former exclave of Shropshire is shown on old maps — here with a blue outline.

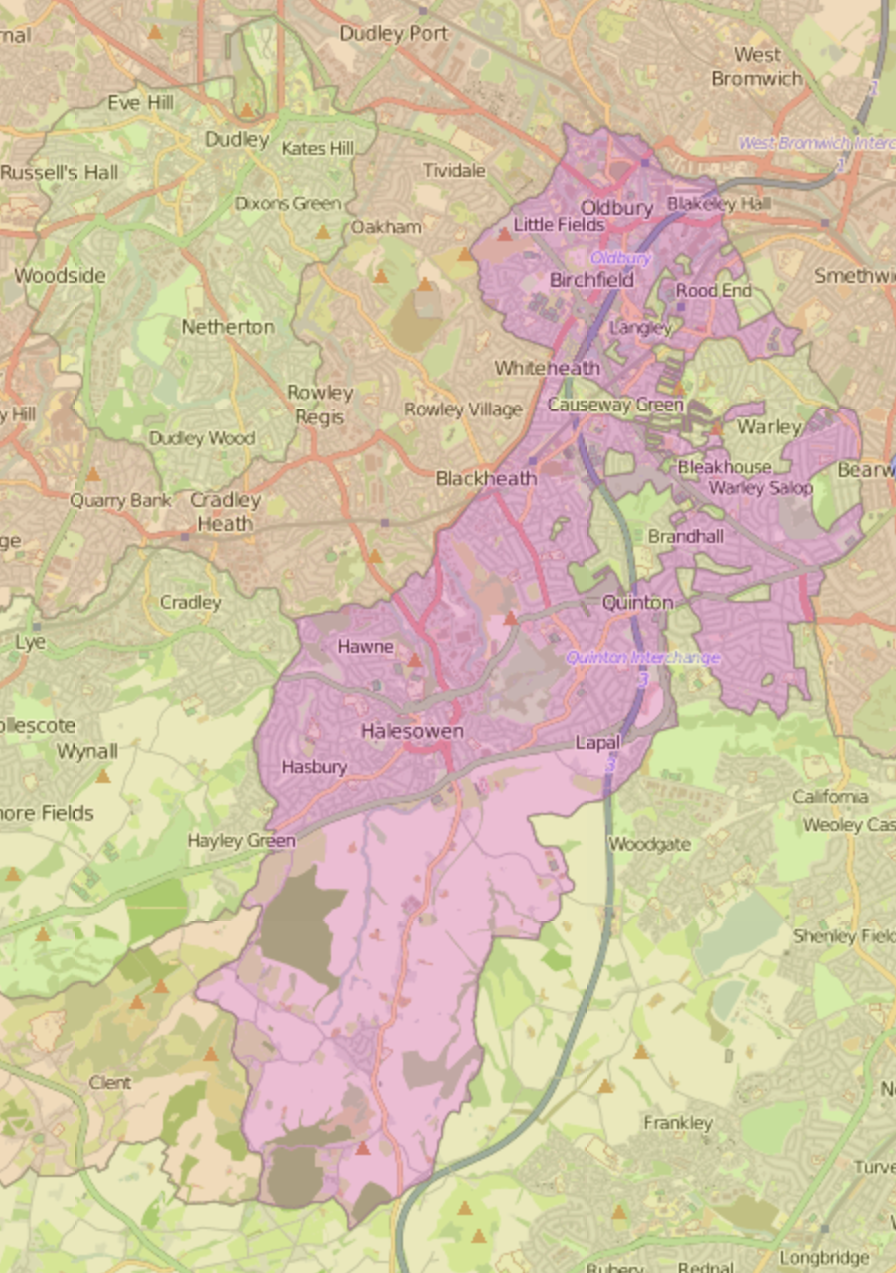
The ancient parish of Halesowen had extremely complex boundaries; Shropshire in red, Worcestershire in green. (Historic County Borders Project)

Halesowen (originally called Hale Manor) was a medieval parish in the West Midlands of England.

The townships of Halesowen, Cakemore, Hasbury, Hawne, Hill, Hunnington, Illey, Lapal, Oldbury, Ridgacre, Romsley and Warley Salop formed a detached part of Shropshire; the rest of the parish, consisting of the chapelries of Cradley and Frankley, and the hamlets of Lutley and Warley Wigorn, was part of Worcestershire.

The Counties (Detached Parts) Act 1844 made the entire area part of Worcestershire. Each of these townships, chapelries and hamlets became a civil parish in 1866.

Subsequently

- Ridgacre, under the name of Quinton was added to Birmingham in Warwickshire in 1909, and has formed part of the Birmingham metropolitan district in West Midlands since 1974
- Halesowen (with Cakemore, Cradley, Hasbury, Hawne, Hill, Illey, Lapal and Lutley) has formed part of the Metropolitan Borough of Dudley in West Midlands since 1974
- Oldbury, Warley Salop and Warley Wigorn became part of the County Borough of Warley (Worcestershire) in 1966 and since 1974 the Sandwell metropolitan borough in West Midlands
- Frankley and Romsley do not form part of any metropolitan district; and are part of the Bromsgrove district of Worcestershire; part of Frankley was added to Birmingham and is now known as New Frankley in Birmingham

== See also ==
- Evolution of Worcestershire county boundaries
- Shropshire (Detached) - Halesowen
