= Ambersham =

Ambersham may refer to the following places in England:

- North Ambersham, West Sussex, England
- South Ambersham, West Sussex, England
