= Randal Mathews Burdon =

Soldier, sheepfarmer, historian (1896–1965)

- Born: 4 August 1896; North Ambersham, Sussex, England
- Died: 29 November 1965 (aged 69); Wellington, New Zealand
- Military career
- Branch: British Army; British Indian Army
- Service years: 1914–1918; 1919–1922
- Rank: Captain
- Conflicts: First World War; Western Front; Italian Front
- Awards: Military Cross
- Other work: Historian

Randal Mathews Burdon (4 August 1896 – 29 November 1965) was an English-born New Zealand historian with several works published from the 1930s to 1960s. He also served in the British Army in the First World War.

== Early life ==
Burdon was born in North Ambersham, Sussex, England, on 4 August 1896 to Mildred and Cotsford Mathews Burdon. He emigrated to New Zealand with his family when he was six years old. His parents began sheep farming in Woodbury, in the Canterbury region of the South Island. Educated at schools in or near Christchurch, he was in England intending to study law when the First World War broke out.

== First World War ==
Joining the British Army, he was commissioned as a second lieutenant. Posted to the Queen's Royal West Surrey Regiment, he served on the Western Front and later in the Italian Campaign. Wounded twice in the course of his war service, he was the recipient of a gallantry award, the Military Cross. In October 1918, he transferred to the British Indian Army as a probationary lieutenant and was posted to a pioneer unit the following month. He transferred to the 13th Duke of Connaught's Lancers, which served on the north-west frontier of India, in June 1919 and received a promotion to captain in January 1920.

== Writing career ==
In 1922, Burdon, having married Jean Stewart Bowden two years before, retired from the Indian Army, still as a captain, and returned to New Zealand. He took up sheep farming in Woodbury, where his family farmed after their arrival from England in 1902. He started writing history books in the 1930s and his first work, a history of farming in the Canterbury region, was published in 1938. In 1942 he worked with the novelist Ngaio Marsh on a history of New Zealand for the 'Britain in pictures' series. Short accounts of notable New Zealanders, in three volumes, was followed by a biography of Sir Julius Vogel. He also wrote Outlaw's Progress, a work of fiction published in 1943, which he later disavowed, describing it as a "damn bad novel".

With his health in decline, in 1948 Burdon moved from his farm to Wellington. He was contracted by the War History Branch, the section of the Department of Internal Affairs tasked with the production of a history of New Zealand's contribution to the Second World War, to produce an account of the 24th Battalion. One of several volumes of the Official History of New Zealand in the Second World War 1939–45, his book was published in 1953 and was followed two years later with a biography of Richard Seddon. A study of the Christchurch academic, Alexander Bickerton, was produced the next year. Having already had to resort to walking with the assistance of a cane for several years, his research abilities were becoming compromised by his physical condition, which affected his abilities to undertake serious archival work. In 1965, he produced The New Dominion, a social history of New Zealand from 1919 to 1939, but critics noted it was heavily based on newspapers and secondary sources.

In his later years, Burdon contributed to a number of journals and was a book reviewer for the weekly New Zealand Listener. He was a contributor to the publication An Encyclopaedia of New Zealand, which was printed after his death at home from coal gas poisoning on 28–29 November 1965. Although it produced two children, both of whom survived him, his marriage to Jean Bowden had ended in a divorce in 1932.
