= Counties (Detached Parts) Act 1844 =

Act of the Parliament of the United Kingdom

Counties (Detached Parts) Act 1844 (Note: The citation of this act by this short title was authorised by section 1 of, and the first schedule to, the Short Titles Act 1896. Due to the repeal of those provisions it is now authorised by section 19(2) of the Interpretation Act 1978.)
- Act of Parliament
- Parliament of the United Kingdom
- Long title: An Act to annex detached Parts of Counties to the Counties in which they are situated.
- Citation: 7 & 8 Vict. c. 61
- Territorial extent: England and Wales (Note: Section 1.)

Dates
- Royal assent: 6 August 1844
- Commencement: 20 October 1844
- Repealed: 26 October 1972
Other legislation
Amended by	Statute Law Revision Act 1874 (No. 2); Justices of the Peace Act 1949
Repealed by	Local Government Act 1972

Status: Repealed

Text of statute as originally enacted

The Counties (Detached Parts) Act 1844 (7 & 8 Vict. c. 61), also known as the Detached Parishes Act 1844, was an act of the Parliament of the United Kingdom which came into effect on 20 October 1844 and eliminated many outliers or exclaves of counties in England and Wales for civil purposes. The changes were based on recommendations by a boundary commission, headed by the surveyor Thomas Drummond and summarised in a schedule attached to the Parliamentary Boundaries Act 1832 (2 & 3 Will. 4. c. 64). This also listed a few examples of civil parishes divided by county boundaries, most of which were dealt with by later legislation. The act was repealed in its entirety by the Local Government Act 1972.

== Antecedents ==
=== Inclosure Acts ===
The areas involved had already been reorganised for some purposes.

This was a process which began with the inclosure acts of the later 18th century. A parish on a county boundary which used the open-field system could have its field strips distributed among the two counties in a very complicated way. Enclosure could rationalise the boundary in the process of re-distributing land to the various landowners. Two parishes mentioned in the Counties (Detached Parts) Act 1844 had been subject to this procedure: Stratton Audley in Buckinghamshire and Oxfordshire (1770), and Farndish in Northamptonshire and Bedfordshire (1800).

On the other hand, an inclosure act could leave such county boundary anomalies alone – and so they would appear as ghost field strips on the map, overlaying the hedged fields of the parliamentary enclosure. Pirton in Bedfordshire was enclosed in 1818, but the field-strip Bedfordshire exclaves of Shillington survived in this way to be dealt with by the Counties (Detached Parts) Act 1844.

=== St Martin's Le Grand ===
A special case occupied Parliament's attention in 1815. The Liberty of St Martin's Le Grand was situated in the City of London, but was part of the parish of Martin's Westminster and therefore an exclave of Middlesex. The City of London and Westminster Streets and Post Office Act 1815 (55 Geo. 3. c. xci) annexed the Liberty to the Aldersgate Ward of the City of London at the behest of the City authorities, who had complained for centuries about the alleged criminality and actual commercial freedom of the inhabitants. The act was for the building of a new General Post Office in the Liberty. However, the few electors left in residence were still under Westminster and this illustrated the need for multiple parliamentary interventions to deal with the issues thrown up by exclaves.

=== County Transfer of Land Bill 1825 ===
The systematic involvement of the House of Commons began in February 1825, when Charles Fyshe Palmer, Member of Parliament for Reading, moved a private member's bill entitled "County Transfer of Land Bill":

To empower magistrates at quarter sessions to effect Exchanges between counties of insulated parcels of Land, for the more convenient administration of justice. To provide a remedy for the inconvenience and perplexity which resulted from having certain parcels of land belonging to particular counties situated at a considerable distance from these counties".

The bill was allowed to be read, but did not pass. However, the process resulted in the publication in May 1825 of the "County Boundary: Returns from Clerks of the Peace of Insulated Parcels of Land". Each county's clerk of the peace had been asked to report on their county's exclaves ("insulated parcels"), together with their valuations for land tax and county rate purposes. Their replies were collected and printed. The process was not altogether satisfactory, witness the return of the Hertfordshire clerk:

There is much difficulty in answering the inquiries with any certainty. I do not know of any person having sufficient local knowledge of the County to give the information with accuracy.

The Ordnance Survey First Series maps were a "work in progress", and his colleague in Bedfordshire was frank in admitting his reliance on a commercial map of no legal standing and of questionable accuracy:

I have no official knowledge of the boundaries of the county. But it appears, on reference to the large engraved map of the County upon a survey in the year 1765...that a small part of the parish of Studham...is locally situate in the county of Hertford.

Actually, Studham was equally divided between the two counties and the exclave that the clerk was referring to belonged to Whipsnade. This sort of mistake illustrates the difficulties in drafting the specific changes to be dealt with by the 1844 act.

=== Parliamentary Boundaries Act 1832 ===
The Parliamentary Boundaries Act 1832 (2 & 3 Will. 4. c. 64) abolished the county outliers for the purposes of fixing the boundaries of parliamentary constituencies. This was in the context of the Reform Act 1832. Previously each county, including its exclaves (but excluding its boroughs) elected two knights of the shire to the House of Commons.

This act included a schedule ("Schedule M") of county boundary anomalies to be acted upon, drawn up by a boundary commission headed by the surveyor Thomas Drummond. This schedule included a few examples of salients and divided parishes, as well as true exclaves, and was to be used in the 1844 act.

=== Census report 1833 ===
The Census (Great Britain) Act 1830 (11 Geo. 4. c. 30) was prescribed the 1831 Census, and also known as the "Population Act". It requested a schedule to be prepared by the Census Office as regards county boundary anomalies, which was published in 1833 under the title "Irregularities of Boundary of the Several Counties in England and Wales". This detailed all known examples of county boundaries dividing parishes as well as of exclaves.

=== Acts of 1839 ===
Two acts of Parliament of 1839 addressed the problems associated with law enforcement in county exclaves:

The Counties (Detached Parts) Act 1839 allowed justices of the peace to act for enclaves surrounded by their county, although this left the question of jurisdiction open as regards exclaves surrounded by more than one county.

Police constabularies established under the County Police Act 1839 were given jurisdiction over detached parts of other counties within their county territory in the same manner.

== Provisions ==
Section 1 of the Counties (Detached Parts) Act 1844 read in part as follows:

[F]rom and after the Twentieth Day of October next every Part of any County in England or Wales which is detached from the main Body of such County shall be considered for all Purposes as forming Part of that County of which it is considered a Part for the Purposes of the Election of Members to serve in Parliament as Knights of the Shire [...]

Section 2 of the act went on to state that the parts transferred would be incorporated in an existing:

Hundred, Wapentake, Ward, Rape, Lathe, or other like Division by which it is wholly or for the most Part surrounded, or to which it is next adjoining, in the County to which it will thenceforth belong, unless the Justices of the County, [...] shall declare it to be a new or separate Hundred or other like Division [...].

The act itself did not list the areas transferred; these had already been detailed in "Schedule M" of the Parliamentary Boundaries Act 1832.

== Effects ==
=== Immediate changes ===
Despite the prescriptive nature of Section 1 of the act, its powers were applied in a discretionary manner and following the provisions of "Schedule M" of the 1832 Act – which was not a comprehensive list of extant exclaves.

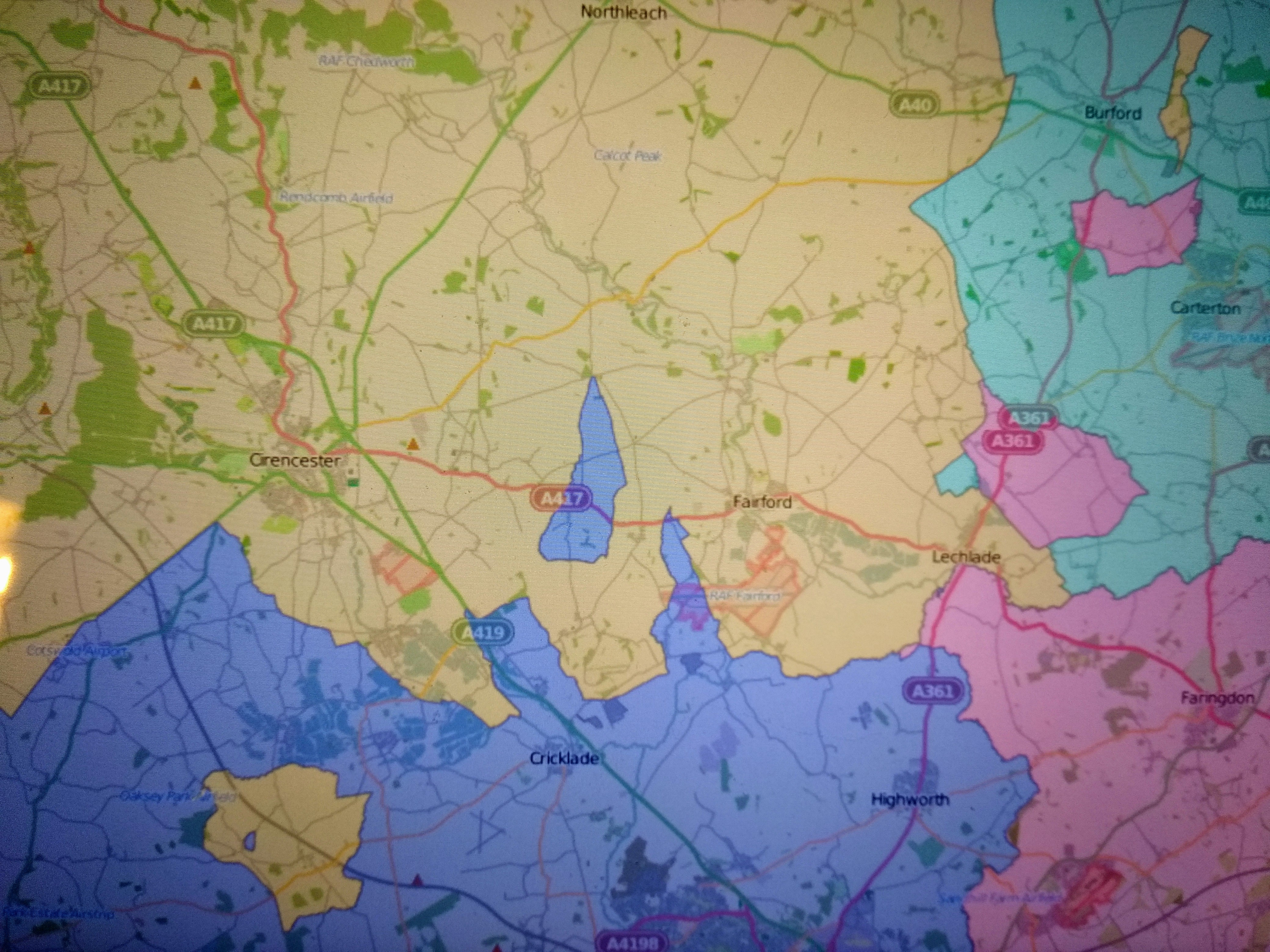
Exclaves abolished by Act, l. to r: Minety Gloucs (with counter-exclave around church), Poulton Wilts, Broughton Poggs Oxon, Inglesham Wilts (small, s. of Lechlade), Little Faringdon and Langford Berks, Shilton Berks, Widford Gloucs. (Historic County Borders Project)

The act affected twenty-seven counties. The largest changes were to County Durham, which lost substantial territory to Northumberland, as well as a single parish to Yorkshire.

However, by no means all detached areas were changed: fifteen counties still had exclaves. As with the 1832 Act, apart from County Durham those counties with large multi-parish exclaves, such as Derbyshire, Flintshire, Worcestershire and Warwickshire, had them left alone. The act made no provision to exchange territory in compensation for lost exclaves, and those counties which would have lost a substantial proportion of territory were either completely left alone (Flintshire) or mostly so (Worcestershire).

Many smaller exclaves were overlooked in the drawing up of the 1832 schedule and so were ignored in the 1844 Act, for example the small exclaves of the Buckinghamshire parishes of Drayton Beauchamp and Marsworth in Hertfordshire. Similarly, the chaotic meeting of Nottinghamshire, Lincolnshire and Yorkshire at Auckley and Misson was ignored despite the Ordnance Survey First Series 1841 not attempting to show boundaries (and giving despairing notes instead, e.g.: "Township of Auckley in the Counties of York and Nottingham").

Muddle could be a factor in exclaves being left alone. Northamptonshire had eight small exclaves in the Huntingdonshire parish of Great Catworth, which were reported by the confused clerk of the peace of the latter county in 1825 as the county's enclaves when he had been asked to report on exclaves. The 1832 schedule listed them as exclaves of Huntingdonshire in Northamptonshire (back to front), and the 1844 Act ignored them.

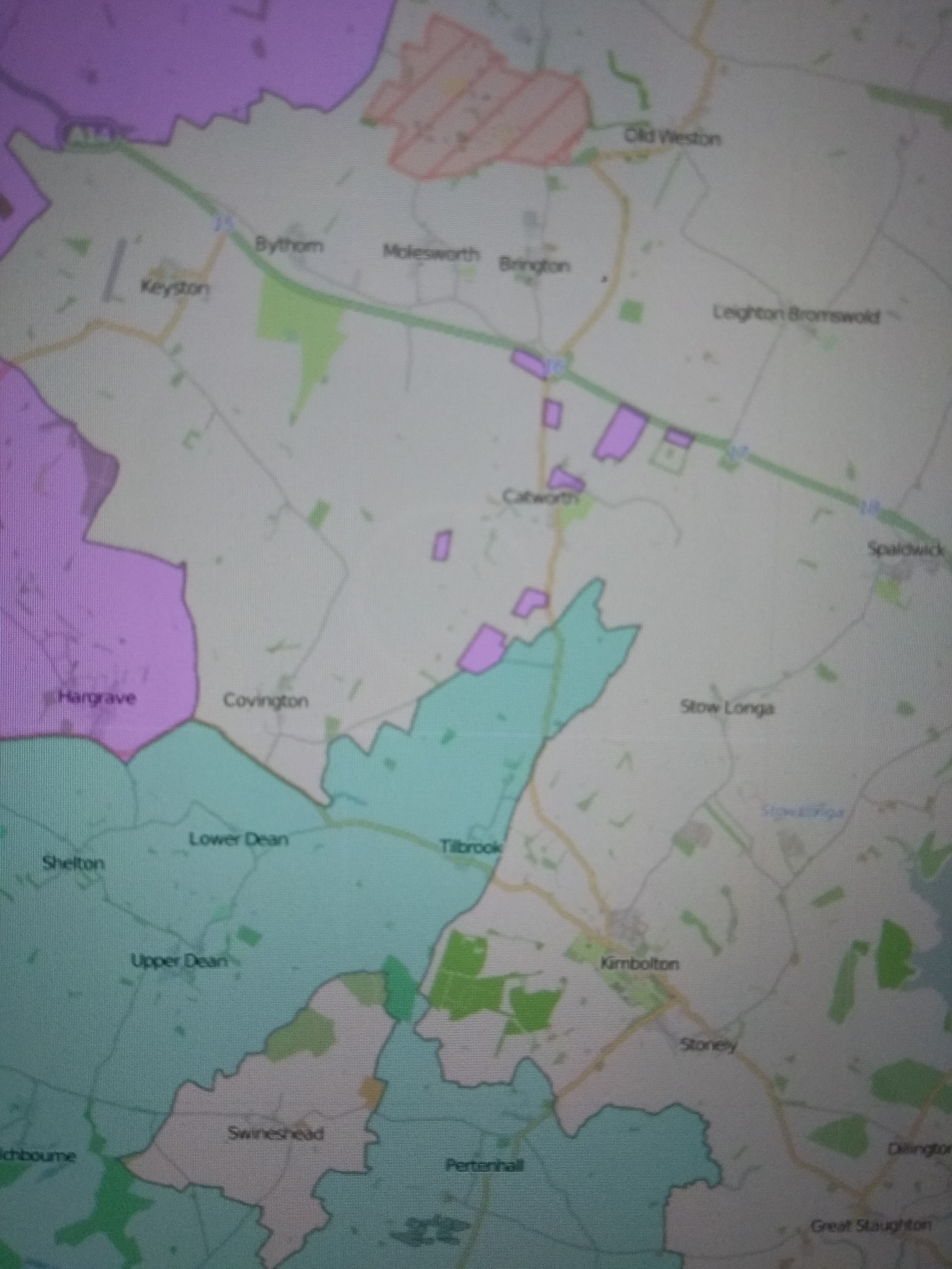
Exclaves of Northamptonshire missed by the act, also shows Swineshead exclave of Huntingdonshire. (Historic County Borders Project)

The wording of the act was effective in dealing with exclaves wholly or mostly surrounded by a single other county, but not for examples with approximately equal borders of two other counties. For example, the Herefordshire exclave of Ffwddog bordered Monmouthshire and Brecknockshire, and was left alone.

An exclave containing territories belonging to more than one parish was listed by the act as separate legal cases under the parish names concerned, such as the Thorncombe exclave of Devon containing territory belonging to Axminster – this was one exclave, not two.

Several border anomalies were addressed which were outside the act's strict remit because they were not exclaves. Some salients were abolished, and one example of such a transfer (Oxenwood in Berkshire, surrounded mostly by Wiltshire) was challenged as erroneous and cancelled. Two boundary disputes, between Cornwall and Devon and Derbyshire and Cheshire, were resolved using the act although no exclaves or salients were involved. Finally, there were a few strange cases involving divided parishes which were either errors or had ulterior motives, such as Studley in Buckinghamshire transferred to Oxfordshire.

=== Later interventions ===
Many of the surviving outlying parts changed their administration in the 1890s following the passing of the Local Government Act 1894, which made the legal process easier.

Large detached blocks of Warwickshire and Worcestershire, interspersed with Gloucestershire, remained until 1931. Dudley in Worcestershire remained an exclave until 1966, while Flintshire retained two exclaves until 1974 – a large one (the English Maelor area) south-east of Wrexham in Denbighshire, and a single parish exclave (Marford and Hoseley) north of Wrexham.

The 1844 Act had transferred the detached parts to different counties, but not to different parishes. Unless the detached part was an entire parish, this resulted in many cases of a detached part in one county belonging to a parish having its main territory in a different county. Later legislation, including the Divided Parishes and Poor Law Amendment Act 1882, eliminated most instances of civil parishes belonging to two (or more) counties, and by 1901 Stanground in Huntingdonshire and the Isle of Ely was the sole remaining example.

== Areas transferred ==
This list is based on the 1832 "Schedule M" which the 1844 Act used, unless otherwise noted.

=== Bedfordshire ===
Transferred to other counties:

- The parts of the parish of Shillington of Bedfordshire isolated in Hertfordshire, transferred to the latter. There were five small exclaves in fields of Pirton next to Oughtonhead Common, the largest being of very irregular shape and another containing a counter-exclave of Hertfordshire. A sixth contained Shillington Mill at Ickleford. The 1832 schedule listed the parish as Ickleford in error.
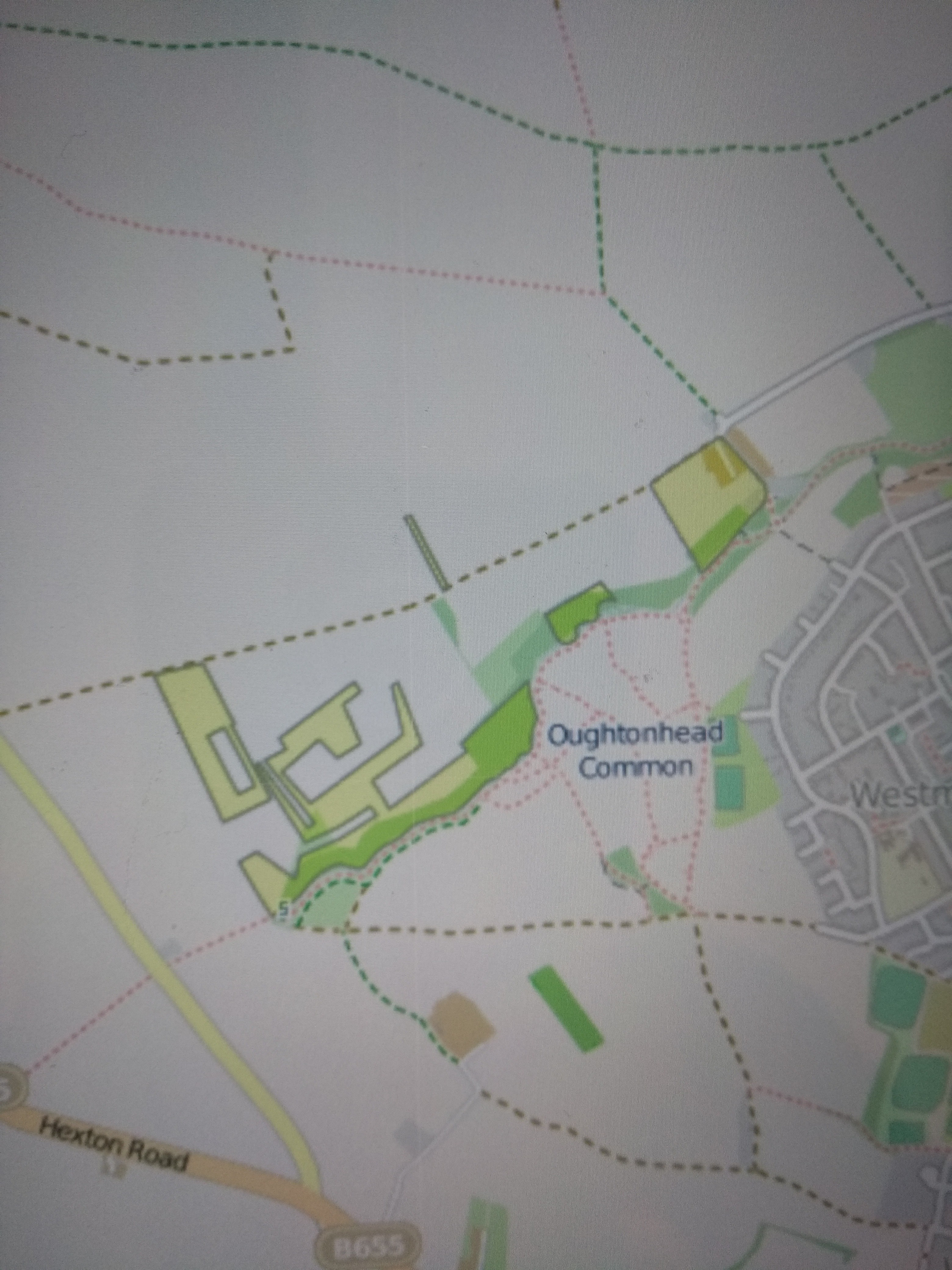
  Exclaves of Shillington, Bedfordshire, in Hertfordshire. (Historic County Borders Project)
- The part of the township of Tetworth (in the ancient parish of Everton) in Bedfordshire, This entry is not in the 1832 schedule. A single irregularly-shaped field by the north-west corner of the southern exclave of the township in Huntingdonshire, north of Biggin Wood moated site, was transferred to Huntingdonshire.
- The part of the parish of Whipsnade in Beechwood Park, transferred to Hertfordshire. The area remained a parish exclave until it was added to Flamstead parish in 1897. The 1832 schedule put it in Studham parish in error, the mistake deriving from a report by the clerk of the peace in 1825 who in turn depended on a 1765 map by Thomas Jefferys.

Transferred from other counties:

- The part of the parish of Farndish in Northamptonshire. This entry is not in the 1832 schedule. Divided parish, not an exclave or salient. However, before the parish was enclosed in 1800, its open field system had its field strips shared out among the two counties in an extremely complicated manner. The Enclosure Act rationalised the boundary and left no exclaves.
- The parts of the parish of Meppershall in Hertfordshire. Three enclaves, the largest containing a small counter-exclave of Bedfordshire. The village was divided between the two counties.

=== Berkshire ===
Transferred to other counties:

- The part of the parish of Great Barrington in Berkshire, transferred to Gloucestershire.
- The part of the divided parish of Inglesham in Berkshire, transferred to Wiltshire. This included a salient which was inaccessible from the rest of the county. The action also abolished a small exclave of Wiltshire, including the parish church. The 1832 schedule had swapped the county names by mistake, and so the 1832 Act left the parliamentary boundary alone -including the exclave.
- The township of Little Faringdon and part of that of Langford proper (both in the ancient parish of Langford), exclave transferred to Oxfordshire. The 1832 schedule listed these separately, the former as a tithing.
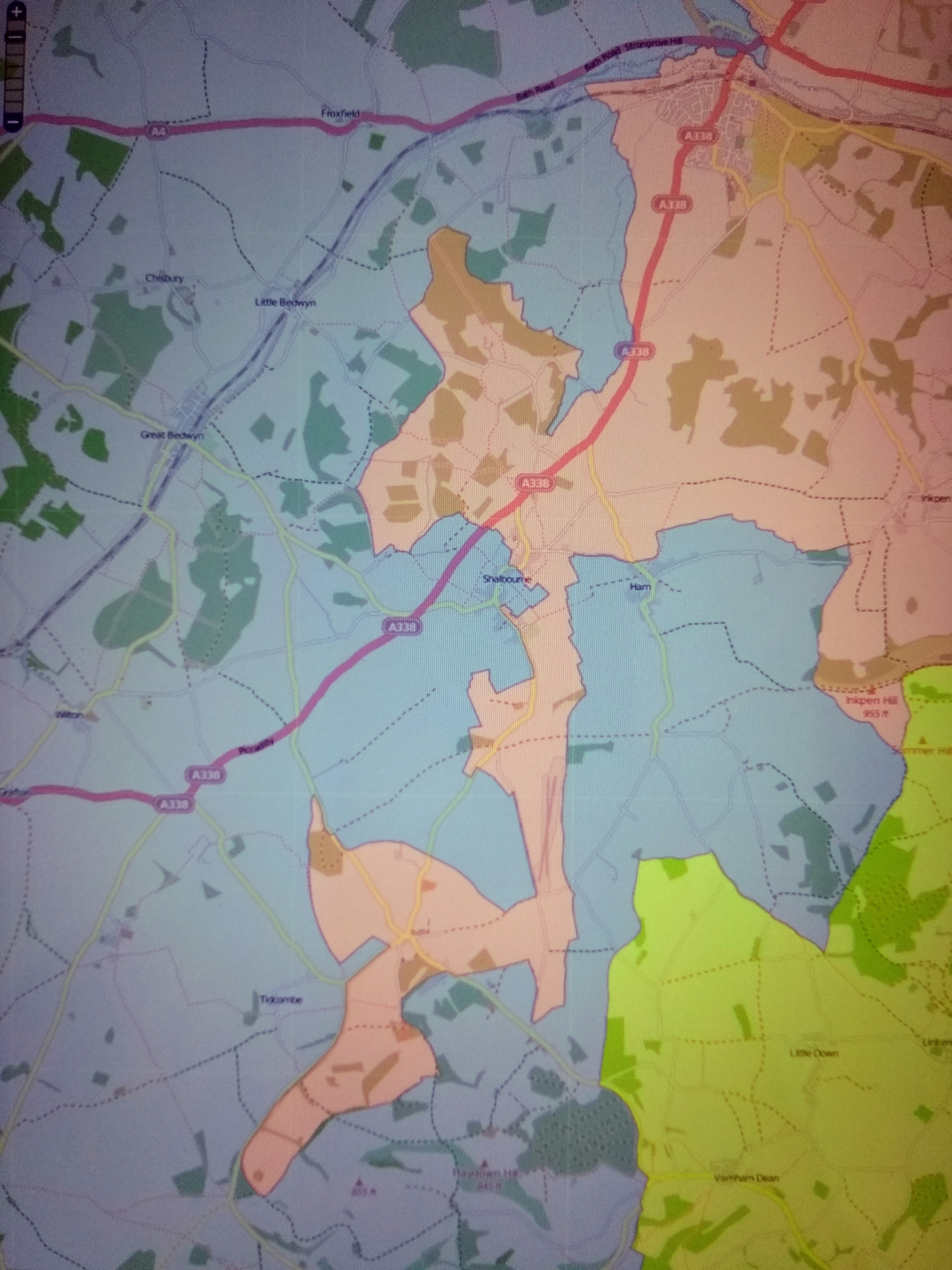
  Shalbourne salient of Berkshire, briefly in Wiltshire 1844 (Historic County Borders Project)
- The part of the parish of Shalbourne including the tithing of Oxenwood in Berkshire, transferred to Wiltshire. This entry is not in the 1832 schedule. It referred to a salient, not an exclave. Oxenwood was included in the 1844 Act by mistake, as it was erroneously reported as an exclave. The relevant Order was cancelled after the error was pointed out. The salient was only annexed by Wiltshire in 1895.
- The greater part of the parish of Shilton in Berkshire, transferred to Oxfordshire. The parish had an exclave comprising a 7-acre (2.8 ha) meadow next to the River Windrush south-east of Witney, which was already in Oxfordshire.

Transferred from other counties:

- The parts of the parochial chapelry of Hurst (in the ancient parish of Sonning) in Wiltshire. Four exclaves, one large and three at Twyford two of the latter being tiny.
- The parts of the parish of Shinfield in Wiltshire. Two exclaves. The larger contained the hamlets of Swallowfield and Riseley, the smaller that of Farley Hill.
- The part of the parish of Wokingham in Wiltshire, including the east end of the town with its parish church. This exclave joined to the large Hurst exclave via an isthmus the width of a road.

=== Buckinghamshire ===
Transferred to other counties:

- The parish of Caversfield, transferred to Oxfordshire. Had two satellite exclaves, including half of the village of Stratton Audley (see below). These were transferred to the parish of Stratton Audley in 1888.
- The part of the extra-parochial place of Luffield Abbey in Buckinghamshire transferred to Northamptonshire.
- The parts of the so-called chapelry of Stratton Audley in Buckinghamshire transferred to Oxfordshire. Before enclosure, in 1770 the parish of Stratton Audley had an open-field system the strips of which were divided between itself and Caversfield in a complicated manner, and the county boundary followed this. Enclosure consolidated the latter's share as two exclaves. The 1832 schedule listed these as the "Chapelry of Stratton Audley", although there was never a chapel separate from the parish church.
- The township of Studley (in the ancient parish of Beckley) in Buckinghamshire, transferred to Oxfordshire. Divided parish, not an exclave or a salient, and this township did not include the village of the same name which was in the adjacent Oxfordshire township of Horton-cum-Studley. The township used to have commoners' rights on Otmoor in Oxfordshire, which had been enclosed in 1815. The commoners disputed this, hence the so-called "Otmoor Riots" 1829–30. The transfer of Studley put the inhabitants under the authority of the Oxfordshire magistrates who were in charge of suppressing these.

Transferred from other counties:

- The chapelry of Ackhampstead (in the parish of Lewknor) in Oxfordshire.
- The hamlet of Boycott (in the parish of Stowe) in Oxfordshire.
- The hamlet of Coleshill (in the parish of Amersham) in Hertfordshire.
- The parish of Lillingstone Lovell in Oxfordshire. To the north of the parish was an exclave of Lillingstone Dayrell and Buckinghamshire separated from the rest by this exclave of Oxfordshire.

=== Cornwall ===
Transferred to other counties:

- The part of the parish of Bridgerule in Cornwall, transferred to Devon. This entry is not in the 1832 schedule. Divided parish, neither an exclave nor a salient. Approximately equal in size to the disputed territory of North Tamerton listed below.
- The part of the parish of Saltash St Stephen on the east side of the River Tamar estuary, transferred to Devon.

Transferred from other counties:

- The part of the parish of Maker in Devon. Two enclaves, one of which was disputed with the adjacent parish of St John which the 1832 schedule hence listed separately
- The part of the parish of North Tamerton in Devon, allegedly. Neither an exclave nor a salient. The Ordnance Survey First Series in 1809 showed the county boundary here as it is now, but "Returns from Clerks of the Peace of Insulated Parcels of Land" to the House of Commons in 1825 had the Clerk for Devon report that the portion of the parish east of the Tamar was in the Black Torrington Hundred of Devon. His counterpart in Cornwall did not concur. The 1844 Act was used to settle a boundary dispute.

=== Denbighshire ===
Transferred to other counties:

- The township of Carreghova (in the parish of Llanymynech), transferred to Montgomeryshire.

=== Derbyshire ===
Transferred to other counties:

- Part of the township of Foston and Scropton (in the ancient parish of Scropton), transferred to Staffordshire.

Also:

- The part of the township of Beard in the parish of Glossop on the Cheshire side of the River Goyt was declared to be in Derbyshire – its previous status was uncertain. Divided township, not an exclave. The act was used to settle a boundary dispute involving a set of fields just south of what is now New Mills.

=== Devon ===
Transferred to other counties:

- The part of the parish of Maker in Devon, transferred to Cornwall. Two enclaves, one of which was disputed with the adjacent parish of St John which the 1832 schedule hence listed separately
- The part of the parish of North Tamerton in Devon, allegedly. Neither an exclave nor a salient. The Ordnance Survey First Series in 1809 showed the county boundary here as it is now, but "Returns from Clerks of the Peace of Insulated Parcels of Land" to the House of Commons in 1825 had the Clerk for Devon report that the portion of the parish east of the Tamar was in the Black Torrington Hundred of Devon. His counterpart in Cornwall did not concur. The 1844 Act was used to settle a boundary dispute.
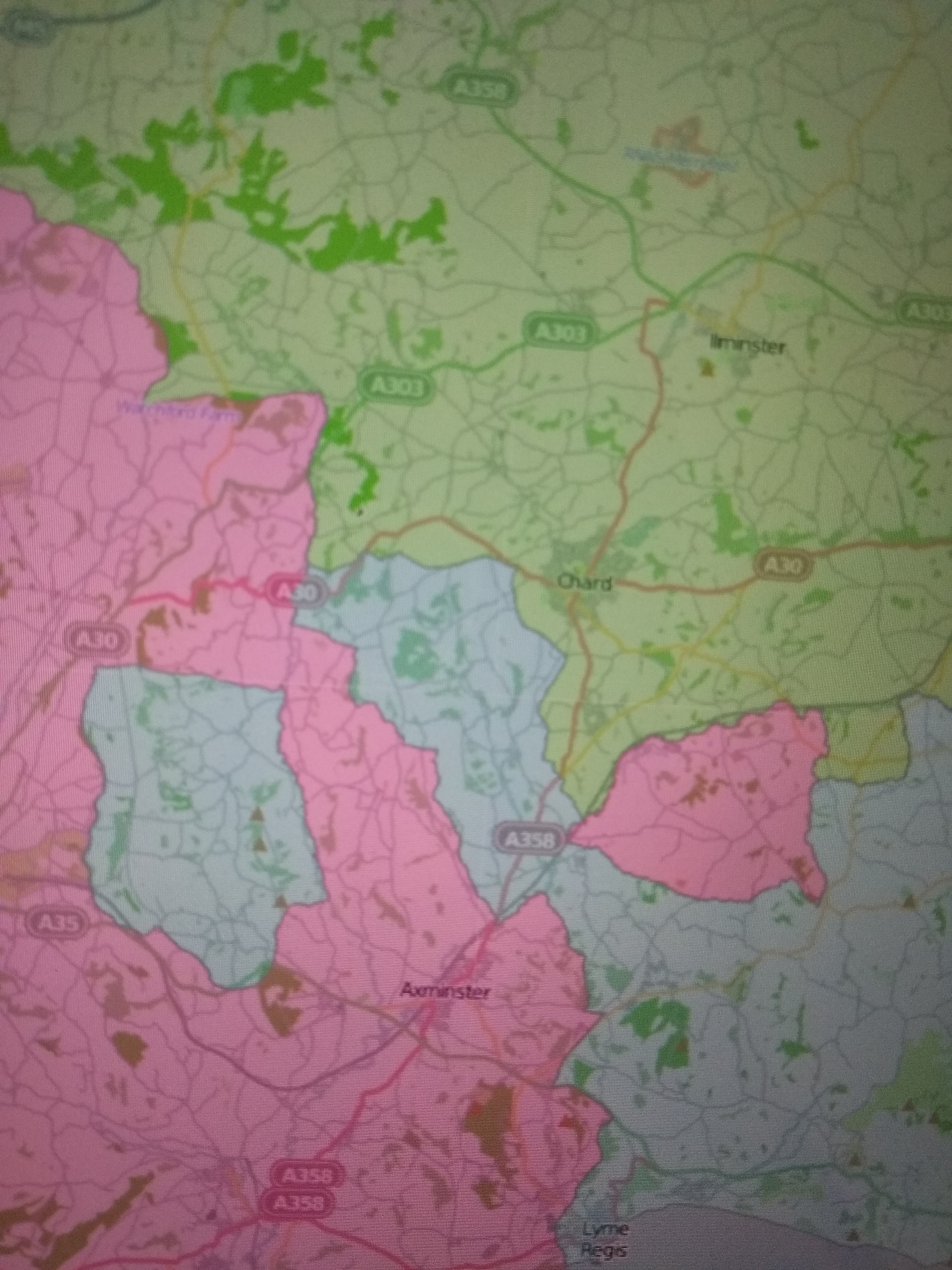
  Pair of Devon and Dorset exclaves, exchanged in the act. (Historic County Borders Project
- The parish of Thorncombe transferred to Dorset, exclave also including the tithing of Beerhall and Easthay, a parish exclave belonging to Axminster. The 1832 schedule listed Thorncombe and Axminster (detached) separately.

Transferred from other counties:

- The part of the parish of Bridgerule in Cornwall, transferred to Devon. This entry is not in the 1832 schedule. Divided parish, neither an exclave nor a salient. Approximately equal in size to the disputed territory of North Tamerton listed above.
- The part of the parish of Saltash St Stephen on the east side of the River Tamar estuary, transferred to Devon.
- The parish of Stockland, including the township of Dalwood, in Dorset. The 1832 schedule listed these separately.

=== Dorset ===
Transferred to other counties:

- The parish of Stockland, including the hamlet of Dalwood, transferred to Devon. The 1832 schedule listed these separately.

Transferred from other counties:

- The parish of Holwell in Somerset.
- The parish of Thorncombe transferred to Dorset, exclave also including the tithing of Beerhall and Easthay, a parish exclave belonging to Axminster. The 1832 schedule listed Thorncombe and Axminster (detached) separately.

=== County Durham ===
Transferred to other counties:

- Bedlingtonshire (the parish of Bedlington) transferred to Northumberland.
- Craikshire (the parish of Crayke) transferred to the North Riding of Yorkshire.
- The extra parochial Farne Islands transferred to Northumberland.
- Islandshire, (consisting of the chapelry of Ancroft, part of the parish of Belford, the township of Holy Island, the chapelry of Kyloe and the chapelry of Tweedmouth), transferred to Northumberland.
- Monks' House, an extra-parochial territory of 0.6 acres (0.24 ha) at Bamburgh and an exclave of Islandshire hence treated with it as a single legal issue. It had functioned as a mainland port for the monks living on Inner Farne, being donated for this purpose in 1257 by King Henry III. Transferred to Northumberland.
- Norhamshire (the ancient parish of Norham) transferred to Northumberland. Made one exclave with Islandshire, above, but treated by the act as a separate legal issue.

=== Gloucestershire ===
Transferred to other counties:

- The township of Lea Lower (in the parish of Lea) in Gloucestershire, transferred to Herefordshire. The parish had three townships, the others being Lea Upper and Lea Bailey.
- The parish of Little Compton transferred to Warwickshire.
- The parish of Minety transferred to Wiltshire. This also abolished a small counter-enclave of the latter county, around the parish church.
- The parish of Shenington transferred to Oxfordshire.
- The parish of Sutton-under-Brailes transferred to Warwickshire.
- The parish of Widford transferred to Oxfordshire.

Transferred from other counties:

- The hamlets of Alstone and Little Washbourne (both in the parish of Overbury) in Worcestershire, forming one exclave. This entry is not in the 1832 schedule.
- The part of the parish of Broughton Poggs called Great Lemhill Farm in Oxfordshire (placed in the parish of Lechlade).
- The township of Church Icomb in the parish of Icomb (older spelling Iccomb) in Worcestershire, transferred to Gloucestershire to join the township already in the latter county called Westward Icomb. The village had been divided between the two.
- The part of the parish of Great Barrington in Berkshire.
- The parish of Kingswood in Wiltshire.
- The parish of Poulton in Wiltshire.

=== Hampshire ===
Transferred to other counties:

- The tithings of North Ambersham and South Ambersham, both in the parish of Steep and making one exclave called Ambersham, transferred to Sussex.

Transferred from other counties:

- The detached part of the parish of Rogate in Sussex known as Bohunt west of Liphook, transferred to the parish of Bramshott.

=== Herefordshire ===
Transferred to other counties:

- The hamlet of Bwlch Trewyn (in the parish of Cwmyoy), transferred to Monmouthshire. A salient, not an exclave. The actual exclave in this parish was called Fwddog, and was only transferred in 1891.
- Crooked Billet, a field of three acres (1.2 ha) in Trelleck parish just north of Devauden, transferred to Monmouthshire.
- The chapelry of Farlow (in the parish of Stottesdon) transferred to Shropshire.
- Part of the township of Litton and Cascob (in the parishes of Cascob and Presteigne), transferred to Radnorshire.
- The chapelry of Rochford (in the parish of Tenbury) transferred to Worcestershire.

Transferred from other counties:

- The township of Lea Lower (in the parish of Lea) in Gloucestershire, transferred to Herefordshire. The parish had three townships, the others being Lea Upper and Lea Bailey.
- The parish of Welsh Bicknor in Monmouthshire.

=== Hertfordshire ===
Transferred to other counties:

- The hamlet of Coleshill (in the parish of Amersham) in Hertfordshire, transferred to Buckinghamshire.
- The parts of the parish of Meppershall in Hertfordshire, transferred to Bedfordshire. Three exclaves, the largest containing a small counter-exclave of Bedfordshire. The village was divided between the two counties.

Transferred from other counties:

- The parts of the parish of Shillington of Bedfordshire isolated in Hertfordshire, transferred to the latter. There were five small exclaves in fields of Pirton next to Oughtonhead Common, the largest being of very irregular shape and another containing a counter-exclave of Hertfordshire. A sixth contained Shillington Mill at Ickleford. The 1832 schedule listed the parish as Ickleford in error.
- The part of the parish of Whipsnade in Beechwood Park, in Bedfordshire. The area remained a parish exclave until it was added to Markyate parish in 1897. The 1832 schedule put it in Studham parish in error, the mistake deriving from a report by the clerk of the peace in 1825 who in turn depended on a 1765 map by Thomas Jefferys.

=== Huntingdonshire ===
Transferred from other counties:

- The part of the township of Tetworth (in the parish of Everton) in Bedfordshire, comprising a single irregularly-shaped field in the north-west corner of the southern exclave of the township in Huntingdonshire, north of Biggin Wood. Transferred to Huntingdonshire. This entry is not in the 1832 schedule. (Tetworth, which became a separate civil parish, remained in two distinct parts, one of which was an exclave of Huntingdonshire until 1965.)

=== Monmouthshire ===
Transferred to other counties:

- The parish of Welsh Bicknor, transferred to Herefordshire.

Transferred from other counties:

- The hamlet of Bwlch Trewyn (in the parish of Cwmyoy), transferred from Herefordshire. (A salient, not an exclave. The actual exclave in the parish was called Fwddog, and the mistake was only rectified with its transfer in 1891.)
- Crooked Billet, a field of three acres (1.2 ha) in Trelleck parish just north of Devauden, transferred from Herefordshire.

=== Montgomeryshire ===
Transferred from other counties:

- The township of Carreghova (in the parish of Llanymynech, which straddled the Welsh border), in Denbighshire.

=== Northamptonshire ===
Transferred to other counties:

- The part of the parish of Farndish in Northamptonshire, transferred to Bedfordshire. This entry is not in the 1832 schedule. Divided parish, not an exclave or salient. However, before the parish was enclosed in 1800, its open field system had its field strips shared out among the two counties in an extremely complicated manner. The Enclosure Act rationalised the boundary and left no exclaves.

Transferred from other counties:

- The part of the extra-parochial place of Luffield Abbey in Buckinghamshire.

=== Northumberland ===
Transferred from other counties:

- Bedlingtonshire (the parish of Bedlington) transferred from County Durham.
- The extra parochial Farne Islands transferred to Northumberland. transferred from County Durham.
- Islandshire, (consisting of the chapelry of Ancroft, part of the parish of Belford, the township of Holy Island, the chapelry of Kyloe and the chapelry of Tweedmouth), transferred from County Durham.
- Monks' House, an extra-parochial territory of 0.6 acres (0.24 ha) at Bamburgh and an exclave of Islandshire. It had functioned as a mainland port for the monks living on Inner Farne, being donated for this purpose in 1257 by King Henry III. Transferred from County Durham.
- Norhamshire (the ancient parish of Norham) transferred from County Durham. Made one exclave with Islandshire, above.

=== Oxfordshire ===
Transferred to other counties:

- The chapelry of Ackhampstead (in the parish of Lewknor) transferred to Buckinghamshire.
- The hamlet of Boycott (in the parish of Stowe) transferred to Buckinghamshire.
- The part of the parish of Broughton Poggs called Great Lemhill Farm in Oxfordshire (placed in the parish of Lechlade).
- The parish of Lillingstone Lovell in Oxfordshire, transferred to Buckinghamshire. To the north of the parish was an exclave of Lillingstone Dayrell and Buckinghamshire separated from the rest by this exclave of Oxfordshire.

Transferred from other counties:

- The parish of Caversfield in Buckinghamshire. Had two satellite exclaves, including half of the village of Stratton Audley (see below). These were transferred to the parish of Stratton Audley in 1888.
- The townships of Little Faringdon and most of Langford proper (both in the ancient parish of Langford), exclave in Berkshire.
- The parish of Shenington in Gloucestershire.
- The greater part of the parish of Shilton in Berkshire. The parish had an exclave comprising a 7-acre (2.8 ha) meadow next to the River Windrush south-east of Witney, which was already in Oxfordshire.
- The part of the so-called chapelry of Stratton Audley in Buckinghamshire transferred to Oxfordshire. Before enclosure, in 1770 the parish of Stratton Audley had an open-field system the strips of which were divided between itself and Caversfield in a complicated manner, and the county boundary followed this. Enclosure consolidated the latter's share as two exclaves. The 1832 schedule listed these as the "Chapelry of Stratton Audley", although there was never a chapel separate from the parish church.
- The township of Studley (in the ancient parish of Beckley) in Buckinghamshire, transferred to Oxfordshire. Divided parish, not an exclave or a salient, and this township did not include the village of the same name which was in the adjacent Oxfordshire township of Horton-cum-Studley. The township used to have commoners' rights on Otmoor in Oxfordshire, which had been enclosed in 1815. The commoners disputed this, hence the so-called "Otmoor Riots" 1829–30. The transfer of Studley put the inhabitants under the authority of the Oxfordshire magistrates who were in charge of suppressing these.
- The parish of Widford in Gloucestershire.

=== Shropshire ===
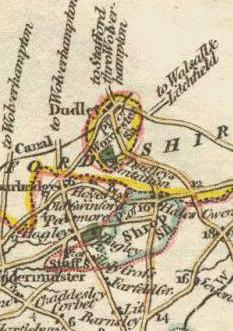
Dudley, shown on an 1814 map as being an exclave of Worcestershire locally situated in Staffordshire. Note also the exclave of Shropshire at Halesowen, abolished by this Act.

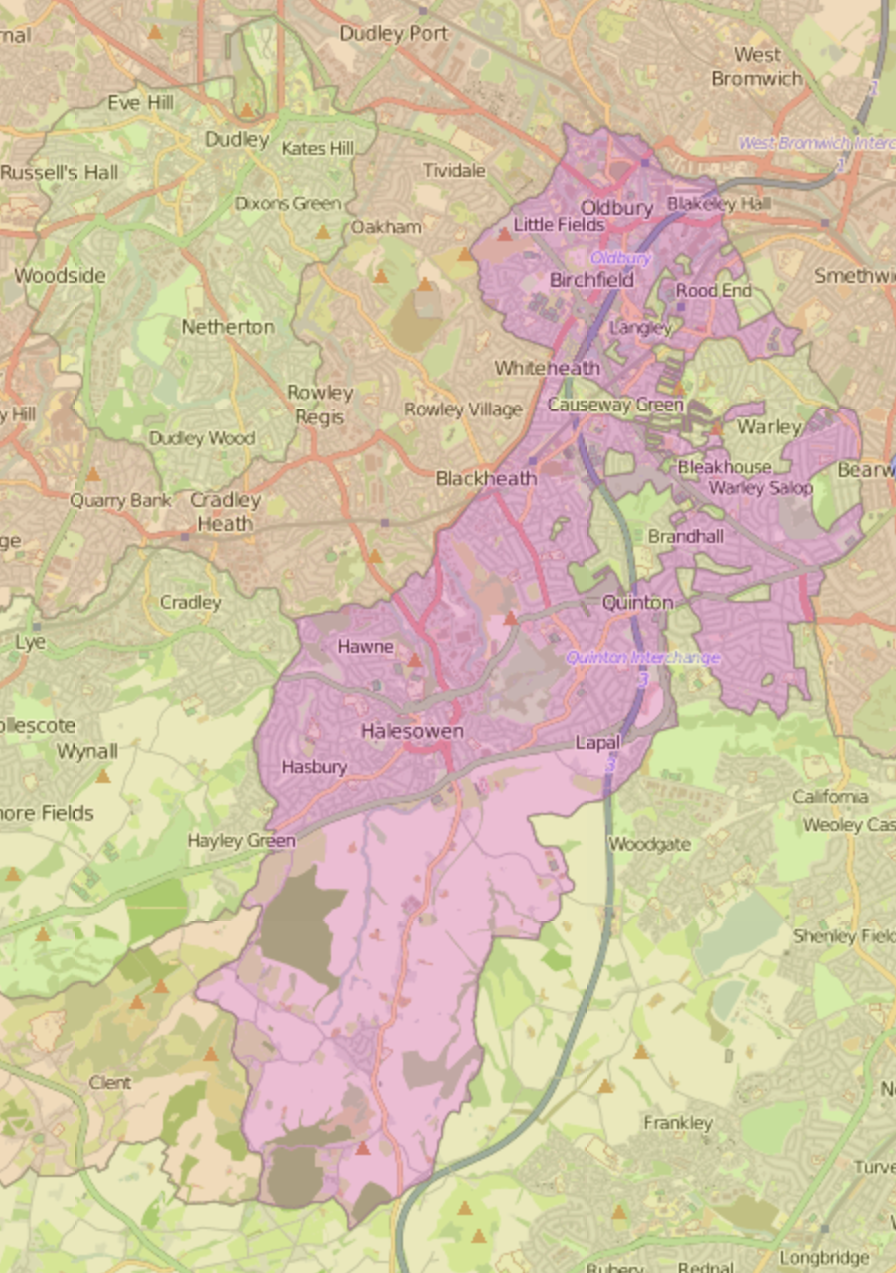
The ancient parish of Halesowen was an exclave of Shropshire. (Historic County Borders Project)

Transferred to other counties:

- The townships of Halesowen, Cakemore, Hasbury, Hawne, Hill, Illey, Lapal, Ridgacre, Hunnington, Oldbury, Romsley and Warley Salop (all in the parish of Halesowen) transferred to Worcestershire. The area around Warley Salop, especially on Barnford Hill south of Langley Green had extremely complicated boundaries. Worcestershire had counter-exclaves and the Shropshire exclave had counter-counter exclaves, both sets including field strips of a fraction of an acre.

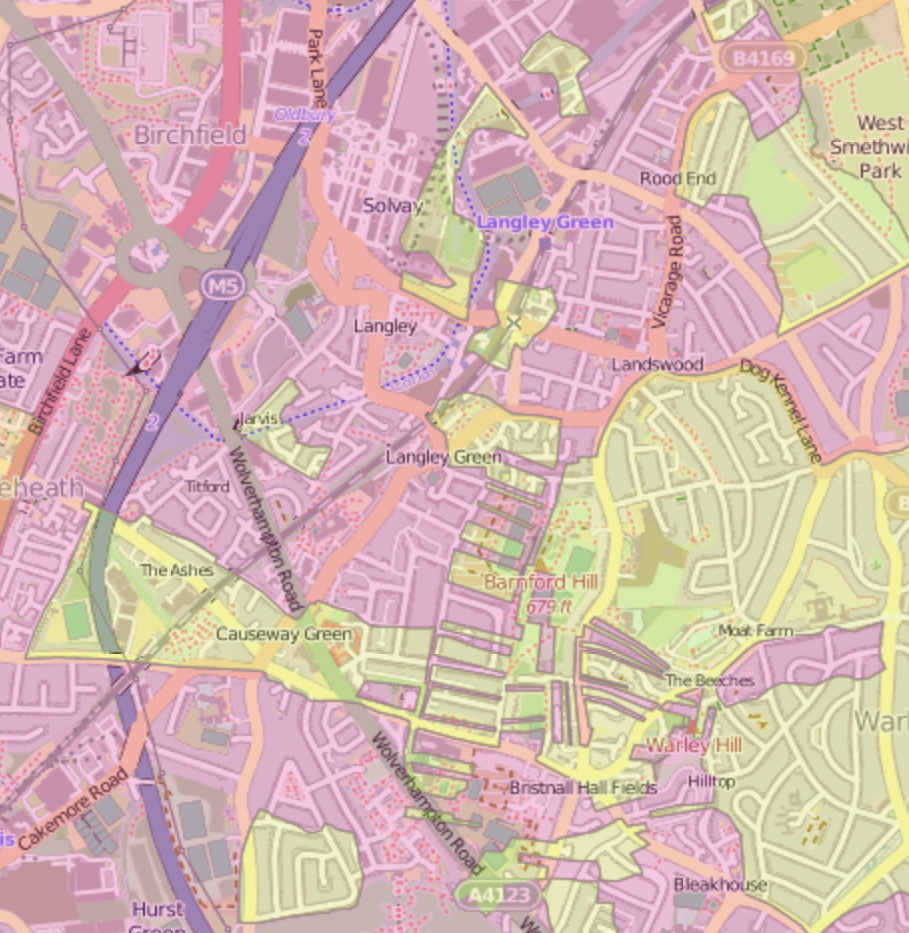
Satellite exclaves of Shropshire (in pink) and Worcestershire at Langley Green, including field strips. (Historic County Borders Project)

Transferred from other counties:

- The chapelry of Farlow (in the parish of Stottesdon) in Herefordshire.

=== Somerset ===
Transferred to other counties:

- The parish of Holwell transferred to Dorset.

=== Staffordshire ===
Transferred to other counties:

- The parish of Broome transferred to Worcestershire.
- The parish of Clent transferred to Worcestershire.

Transferred from other counties:

- Part of the township of Foston and Scropton (in the parish of Scropton) in Derbyshire.

=== Sussex ===
Transferred from other counties:

- The tithings of North Ambersham and South Ambersham, both in the parish of Steep and making one enclave in Sussex, transferred from Hampshire.

Transferred to other counties:

- The detached part of the parish of Rogate known as Bohunt west of Liphook, transferred to the parish of Bramshott in Hampshire.

=== Warwickshire ===
Transferred to other counties:

- The township of Tutnall and Cobley (in the parish of Tardebigge) transferred to Worcestershire.

Transferred from other counties:

- The parish of Little Compton in Gloucestershire.
- The parish of Sutton-under-Brailes in Gloucestershire.

=== Wiltshire ===
Transferred to other counties:

- The part of the parochial chapelry of Hurst (in the parish of Sonning) in Wiltshire. Four exclaves, one large and three at Twyford two of the latter being tiny.
- The parish of Kingswood transferred to Gloucestershire.
- The parish of Poulton transferred to Gloucestershire.
- The part of the parish of Shinfield in Wiltshire. Two exclaves. The larger contained the hamlets of Swallowfield and Riseley, the smaller that of Farley Hill.
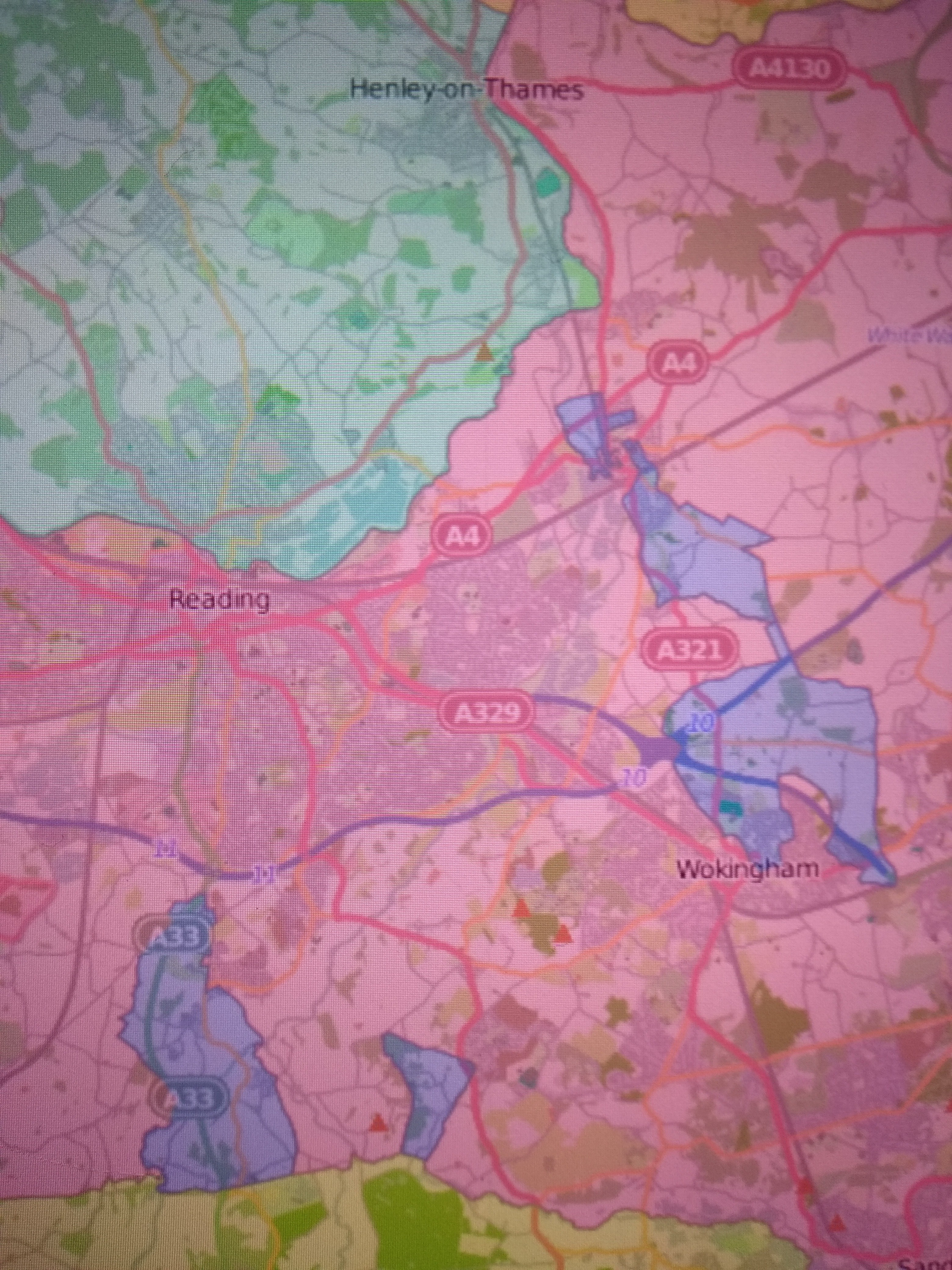
  Exclaves of Wiltshire (lilac) near Reading, Berkshire. (Historic County Borders Project)
- The part of the parish of Wokingham in Wiltshire, including the east end of the town with its parish church. This exclaves joined to the large Hurst exclaves via an isthmus the width of a road.

Transferred from other counties:

- The part of the divided parish of Inglesham in Berkshire. This included a salient which was inaccessible from the rest of that county. The action also abolished a small exclave of Wiltshire, including the parish church. The 1832 schedule had swapped the county names by mistake, and so the 1832 Act left the parliamentary boundary alone -including the exclave.
- Part of the parish of Shalbourne including the tithing of Oxenwood in Berkshire, transferred to Wiltshire only in 1895 -this was a salient, not an exclave. Oxenwood was included in the 1844 Act by mistake, as it was erroneously listed as an exclave. The relevant Order was cancelled after the error was pointed out.

=== Worcestershire ===
Transferred to other counties:

- The hamlets of Alstone and Little Washbourne (both in the parish of Overbury) transferred to Gloucestershire.
- The township of Church Icomb in the parish of Icomb (older spelling Iccomb) in Worcestershire, transferred to Gloucestershire to join the township already in the latter county called Westward Icomb. The village had been divided between the two.

Transferred from other counties:

- The parish of Broom in Staffordshire.
- The parish of Clent in Staffordshire.
- The townships of Halesowen, Cakemore, Hasbury, Hawne, Hill, Illey, Lapal, Ridgacre, Hunnington, Oldbury, Romsley and Warley Salop (all in the parish of Halesowen) transferred from Shropshire. The area around Warley Salop, especially on Barnford Hill south of Langley Green had extremely complicated boundaries. Worcestershire had counter-exclaves and Shropshire had counter-counter exclaves, both sets including field strips of a fraction of an acre.
- The chapelry of Rochford (in the parish of Tenbury) in Herefordshire.

=== Yorkshire, North Riding ===
Transferred from other counties:

- The parish of Crayke in County Durham.

== Scotland and Ireland ==
The 1844 act applied only to England and Wales.

Most detached parts of Irish counties were removed under an 1836 act in conjunction with Griffith's Valuation.

Detached parts of Scottish counties persisted (apart from some exchanged between Inverness and Elgin in 1870) until the Local Government (Scotland) Act 1889, which merged the fragmented county of Cromartyshire into Ross and Cromarty and provided for Boundary Commissioners for Scotland to consolidate all other county exclaves, except one in Dunbartonshire comprising Cumbernauld and Kirkintilloch parishes.

== See also ==
- Enclaves and exclaves
- List of county exclaves in England and Wales 1844–1974
- Parliamentary Boundaries Act 1832

== Bibliography ==
- "Cap. LXI: An Act to annex detached Parts of Counties to the Counties in which they are situated [6th August 1844]". Statutes of the United Kingdom. Vol. XVII part I: 7 & 8 Victoriae. London. 1844. pp. 140–141.
- Hobhouse, H. (26 May 1825). Returns from Clerks of the Peace of Insulated Parcels of Land. Sessional Papers. Vol. HC 1825 XXI (350) 295.
- Moule, Thomas (1836) Moule's English Counties in the 19th century, London: Simpkin & Marshall, republished (1990) as The County Maps of Old England by Thomas Moule, London: Studio Editions Ltd, ISBN 1-85170-403-5
- Youngs, Frederic A. (1979) Guide to the local administrative units of England, Vol. 1: Southern England, Royal Historical Society, Guides and handbooks no. 10., London : University College, ISBN 0-901050-67-9
- Youngs, Frederic A. (1991) Guide to the local administrative units of England, Vol. 2: Northern England, Royal Historical Society, Guides and handbooks no. 17., London : University College, ISBN 0-86193-127-0
