= Lillingstone Lovell =

Village in Buckinghamshire, England

Coordinates: 52.058°N 0.961°W

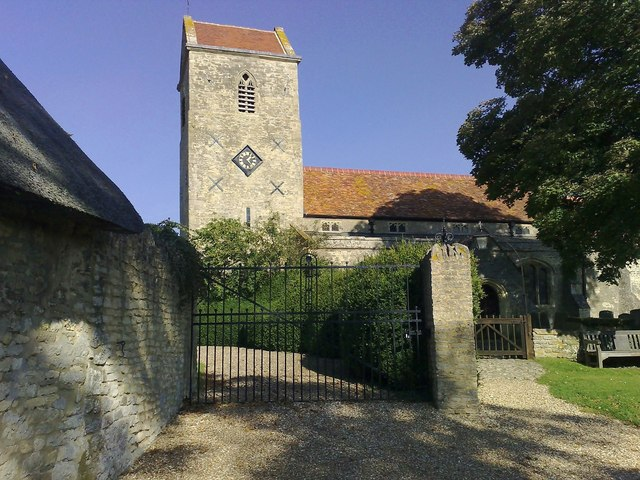
- Parish church of the Assumption

- Location within Buckinghamshire
- Population: 129 (2011)
- OS grid reference: SP7140
- Civil parish: Lillingstone Lovell
- Unitary authority: Buckinghamshire
- Ceremonial county: Buckinghamshire
- Region: South East
- Country: England
- Sovereign state: United Kingdom
- Post town: BUCKINGHAM
- Postcode district: MK18
- Dialling code: 01280
- Police: Thames Valley
- Fire: Buckinghamshire
- Ambulance: South Central
- UK Parliament: Buckingham and Bletchley

Lillingstone Lovell is a village and civil parish in north Buckinghamshire, England. It is located around 4 miles (6.4 km) north of Buckingham and 8 miles (13 km) west of Milton Keynes, and around 5 miles (8 km) south of Towcester in the neighbouring county of Northamptonshire. Silverstone Circuit is located just over 2 miles (3.2 km) north-west of Lillingstone Lovell.

The parish adjoins that of Lillingstone Dayrell with Luffield Abbey. The toponym "Lillingstone" is derived from the Old English for "Lytel's boundary stone", referring to the proximity of both places to the Northamptonshire boundary. At the time of the Domesday Book in 1086 both settlements were recorded jointly as Lillingestan, though at that time there were already two manors owned respectively by the Dayrell and Lovell families. During the 13th century Lillingstone Lovell was known as Lillingstone Magna while Lillingstone Dayrell was recorded as Lillingstone Parva; this is believed to refer more to administrative ascendancy rather than territorial size. The adoption of the "Lovell" name came later, probably in reference to the lordship of the manor by the Lovell family line which died out in the early 14th century.

Unlike its neighbour, Lillingstone Lovell was a detached portion of Oxfordshire under the control of the royal manor of Kirtlington, valued for its woodland and hunting being part of the ancient Whittlewood Forest. It was transferred to Buckinghamshire under the Counties (Detached Parts) Act 1844.

The central part of the village, focussed on the church, Main Street and Brookside, was designated as a Conservation Area in 1989.

== Church ==
The Church of England parish church of the Assumption of the Blessed Virgin Mary is believed to date from the 13th century but was rebuilt in the 14th century. By the middle part of the 18th century it had fallen into disrepair and was repaired and refurbished around 1777 retaining the original medieval tower. It is a Grade I listed building.
