= Pirton, Hertfordshire =

Village in Hertfordshire, England

Coordinates: 51.97277°N 0.33148°W

Pirton
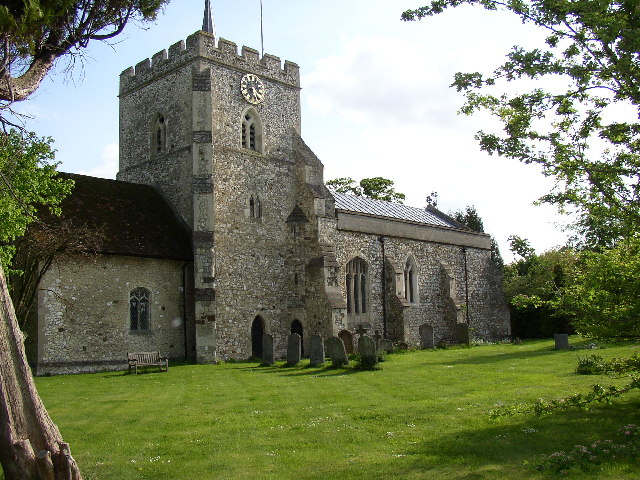
- St Mary's Church, Pirton

- Location within Hertfordshire
- Population: 1,452 (Parish, 2021)
- OS grid reference: TL147317
- District: North Hertfordshire
- Shire county: Hertfordshire
- Region: East
- Country: England
- Sovereign state: United Kingdom
- Post town: Hitchin
- Postcode district: SG5
- Dialling code: 01462
- Police: Hertfordshire
- Fire: Hertfordshire
- Ambulance: East of England
- UK Parliament: Hitchin

Pirton is a village and civil parish in the North Hertfordshire district of Hertfordshire, England. It lies 3 miles (5 km) north-west of the town of Hitchin, and adjoins the border with Bedfordshire. At the 2021 census the parish had a population of 1,452.

== History ==
Pirton first appeared in official records in the Domesday Book in 1086 within the hundred of Hitchin. The village was then recorded as Peritone, meaning 'homestead of pears'.

The parish church of St Mary was rebuilt in 1877, but with the remains of its 12th-century tower. It stands within the bailey of a former castle, Toot Hill. There is also a Methodist church.

Pirton Grange, which was remodelled in the 18th century, is in the north of the parish, and is a particularly interesting, moated Elizabethan house with a timber-framed gatehouse. Hammonds Farm and Rectory Farm, with its tithe barn, are also Elizabethan.

== Geography ==
The designated Area of Outstanding Natural Beauty of the Chiltern Hills covers the western part of the parish, reaching the edge of the village.

The Icknield Way Path passes through the village on its 110-mile (180 km) journey from Ivinghoe Beacon in Buckinghamshire to Knettishall Heath in Suffolk. The Icknield Way Trail, a multi-user route for walkers, horse riders and off-road cyclists also passes through the village.

== Governance ==
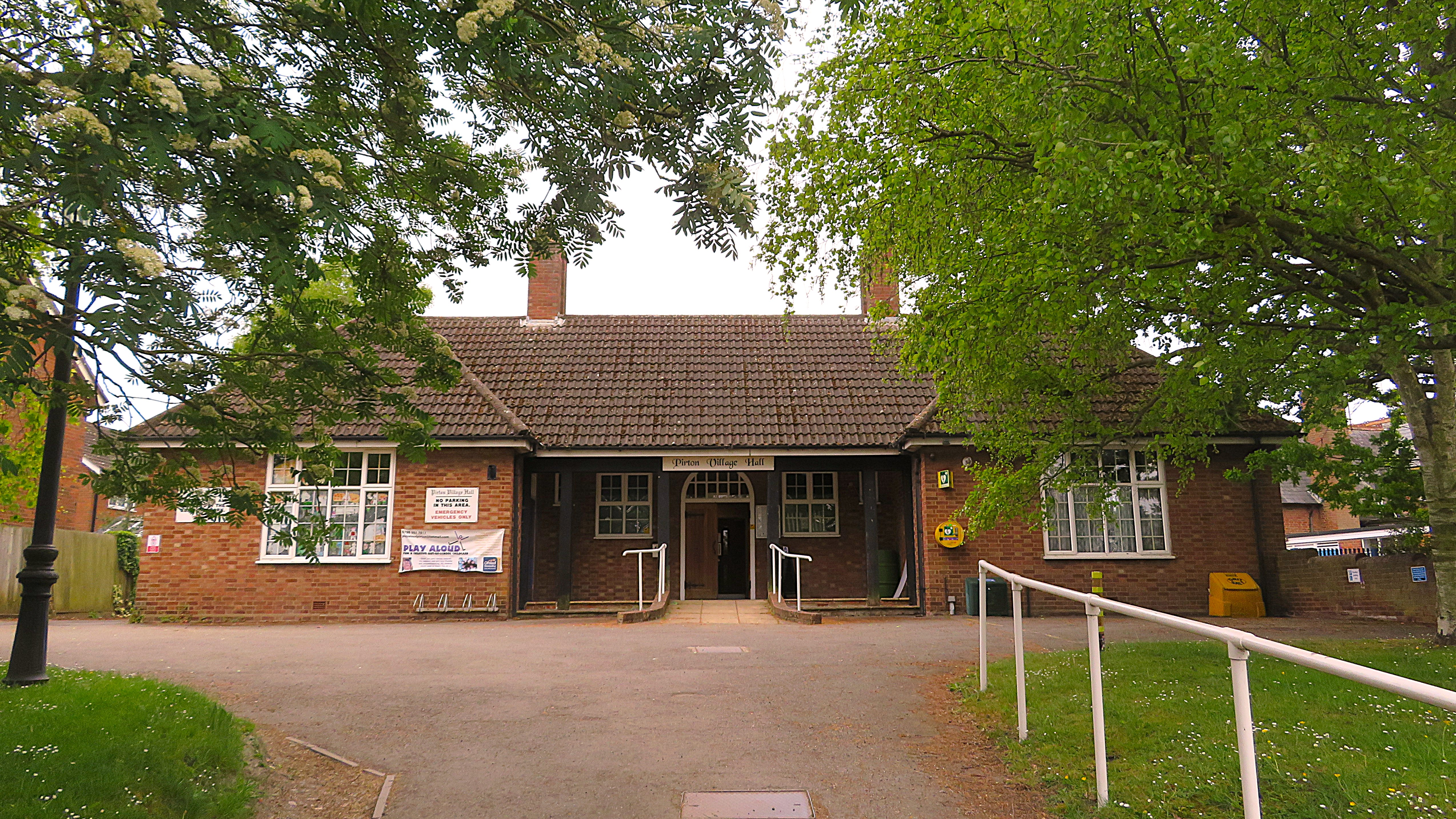
Village Hall, High Street

There are three tiers of local government covering Pirton, at parish, district and county level: Pirton Parish Council, North Hertfordshire District Council, and Hertfordshire County Council. The parish council meets at the village hall on High Street, which was built in 1933.

== Population ==
At the 2021 census, the population of the parish was 1,452. The population had been 1,274 in 2011.

== Education ==
There is a village school which teaches children from reception to Year 6. Many students continue to The Priory School, Hitchin for secondary education.
