= Hill, West Midlands =

Coordinates: 52.463°N 2.040°W

Hill
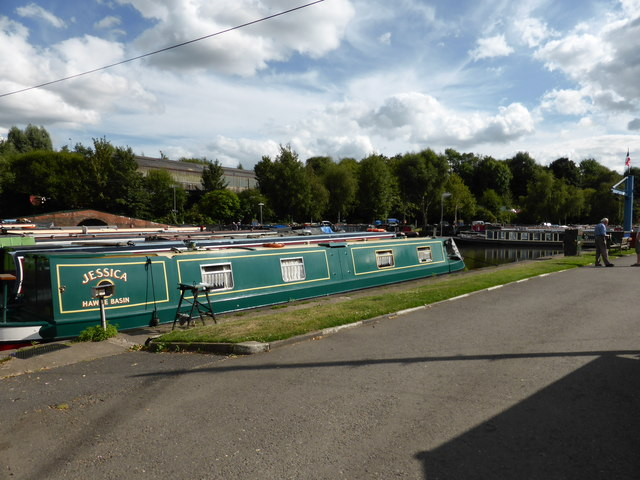
- Hawne Basin

- Location within the West Midlands
- Metropolitan borough: Dudley
- Metropolitan county: West Midlands
- Region: West Midlands
- Country: England
- Sovereign state: United Kingdom
- Police: West Midlands
- Fire: West Midlands
- Ambulance: West Midlands

Hill is a former civil parish in what is now the Dudley district, in the metropolitan county of West Midlands, in England.

The township was situated between Halesowen and Blackheath, and covered an area including Coombeswood, Mucklow Hill and the Halesowen Golf Club.

It was formerly in the Halesowen parish, a detached part of Shropshire, which was transferred to the jurisdiction of Worcestershire in 1844 by the Counties (Detached Parts) Act 1844. It became considered a separate civil parish in its own right in 1866.

It became part of Stourbridge poor law union, and Stourbridge rural sanitary district (RSD). It 1894 it became part of the Halesowen Rural District formed from the Worcestershire parts of the Stourbridge RSD. On 1 April 1919 the parish was abolished to merge with Cakemore to form the parish of Hill and Cakemore. In 1911 the parish had a population of 5031. In 1925 the Halesowen rural district became the Halesowen urban district.
