= Caversfield =

Village and civil parish in England

Coordinates: 51.924°N 1.159°W

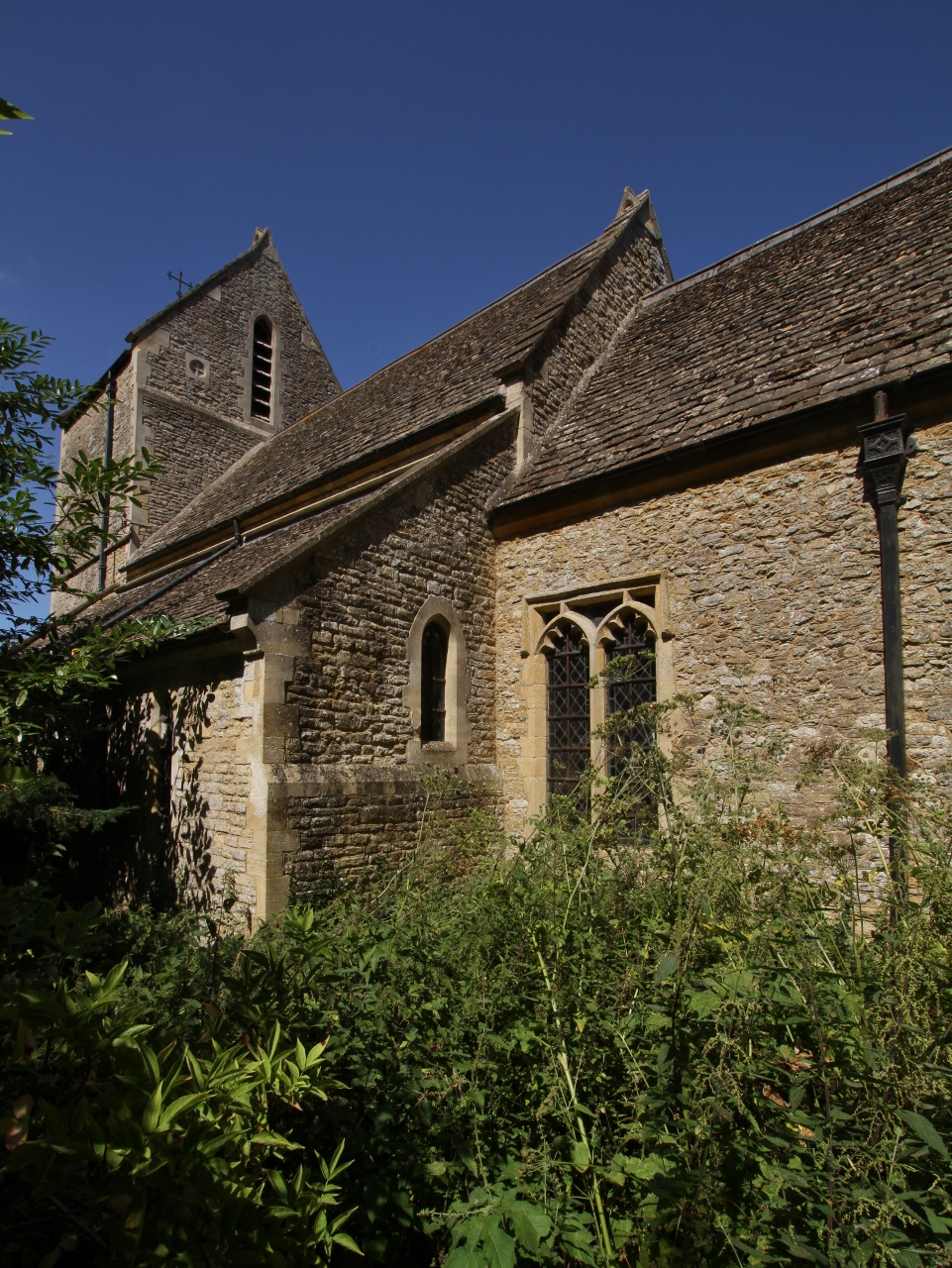
- St Laurence's parish church

- Location within Oxfordshire
- Area: 4.52 km^{2} (1.75 sq mi)
- Population: 1,788 (2011 census)
  - Density: 396/km^{2} (1,030/sq mi)
- OS grid reference: SP5825
- Civil parish: Caversfield
- District: Cherwell
- Shire county: Oxfordshire
- Region: South East
- Country: England
- Sovereign state: United Kingdom
- Post town: Bicester
- Postcode district: OX27
- Dialling code: 01869
- Police: Thames Valley
- Fire: Oxfordshire
- Ambulance: South Central
- UK Parliament: Bicester and Woodstock
- Website: Caversfield Parish Council

Caversfield is a village and civil parish about 1 1/2 miles (2.4 km) north of the centre of Bicester. In 1844 Caversfield became part of Oxfordshire, but until then it was always an exclave of Buckinghamshire. The 2011 census recorded the parish's population as 1,788.

== Early history ==
The ancient Roman road between Alchester and Towcester, now the A4421, forms the eastern boundary of the parish.

Caversfield's toponym has evolved from Cavrefelle in the 11th century through Kaueresfuld, Chauresfeld, Caffresfeld, Caueresfeud and Kaveresfeld (12th–13th centuries), and by the 18th century it was Catesfield.

Before the Norman Conquest of England the manor was held by one Edward, who was a man of Tostig Godwinson, Earl of Northumbria. The Domesday Book records that in 1086 Caversfield was one of the manors owned by William de Warenne, 1st Earl of Surrey. William's descendants retained Caversfield until the beginning of the 14th century.

By 1317 Caversfield was held by Aymer de Valence, 2nd Earl of Pembroke, and when the Earl died in 1324 it passed to his niece Joan. She was the wife of David II Strathbogie, Earl of Atholl, who although Scottish had become a peer of England after King Robert the Bruce deposed and exiled him for rebellion. Caversfield remained with the Earl of Atholl's descendants until 1375, when it passed to the heirs of a different branch of the de Warenne family.

By the 12th century the Gargate family held the feudal tenancy of Caversfield. In 1236 Muriel de Ros and Isabel de Munbury, the daughters of Hugh Gargate, endowed the tenancy of half of the manor to the Augustinian Priory at Bicester. The priory retained this holding until the dissolution of the monasteries after 1536.

In the 13th century the Gargate family owned a watermill, a windmill and a house where the manorial court was held. The watermill was presumably on the small River Bure which rises at Bainton, flows south through Caversfield and Bicester and around Graven Hill, and joins the River Ray at Merton. No trace of either mill is known to survive, and the original manor house has gone.

== Parish church ==
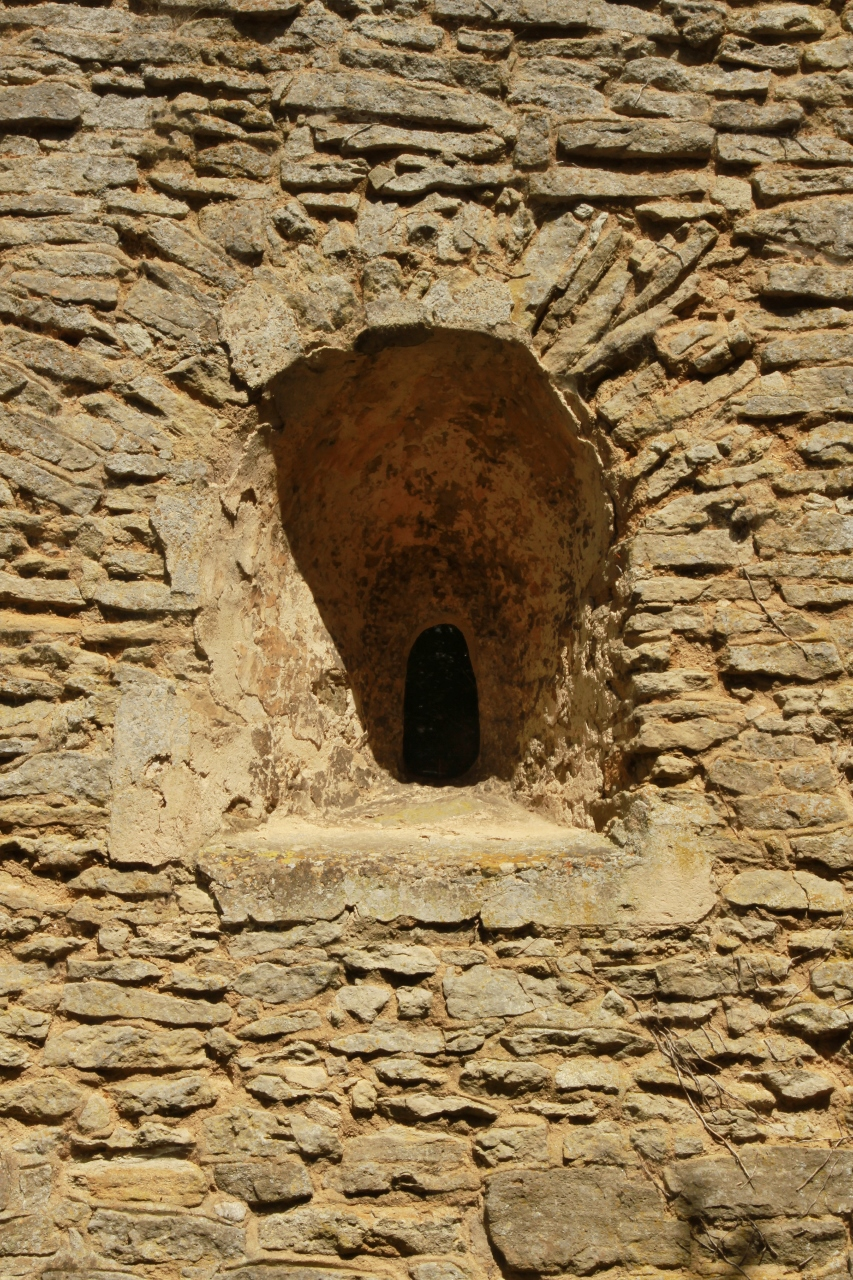
Saxon window in the south side of St Laurence's church tower

The oldest part of the small Church of England parish church of Saint Laurence is the Saxon ground stage of the bell tower, probably from the 10th century. The nave and chancel were rebuilt late in the 12th century. Early in the 13th century the chancel was remodelled again in the Early English Gothic style with two lancet windows at its east end, and the bell-stage of the tower was either added or rebuilt. The small north and south aisles were added around the same time. Each aisle is linked to the nave by an arcade of two bays, in which the style of the piers is of about AD 1180 but the Early English Gothic style of the arches is of about 1230. The south walls of the church include a lancet window, a Decorated Gothic window from early in the 14th century and a Perpendicular Gothic window from late in the 15th century.

In the 18th century the north and south aisles of St Laurence church were demolished and the two arcades blocked up. In 1874 the Gothic Revival architect Henry Woodyer restored the chancel, rebuilt the aisles and added a vestry to the east of the north aisle.

St Laurence's parish is now part of the benefice of Bicester with Caversfield.

=== Church bells ===
Until the 20th century the tower had three bells, including a treble bell that was cast in about 1218 for Hugh and Sibilla Gargate and is believed to be the oldest inscribed bell in England. In the 20th century this bell was removed from the tower and mounted as an historic exhibit inside the church.

The tower now has a ring of five bells. John Taylor & Co of Loughborough cast the tenor bell in 1874 and the fourth bell in 1876. Mears & Stainbank of the Whitechapel Bell Foundry cast the third bell in 1928 and added new treble and second bells in 1949.

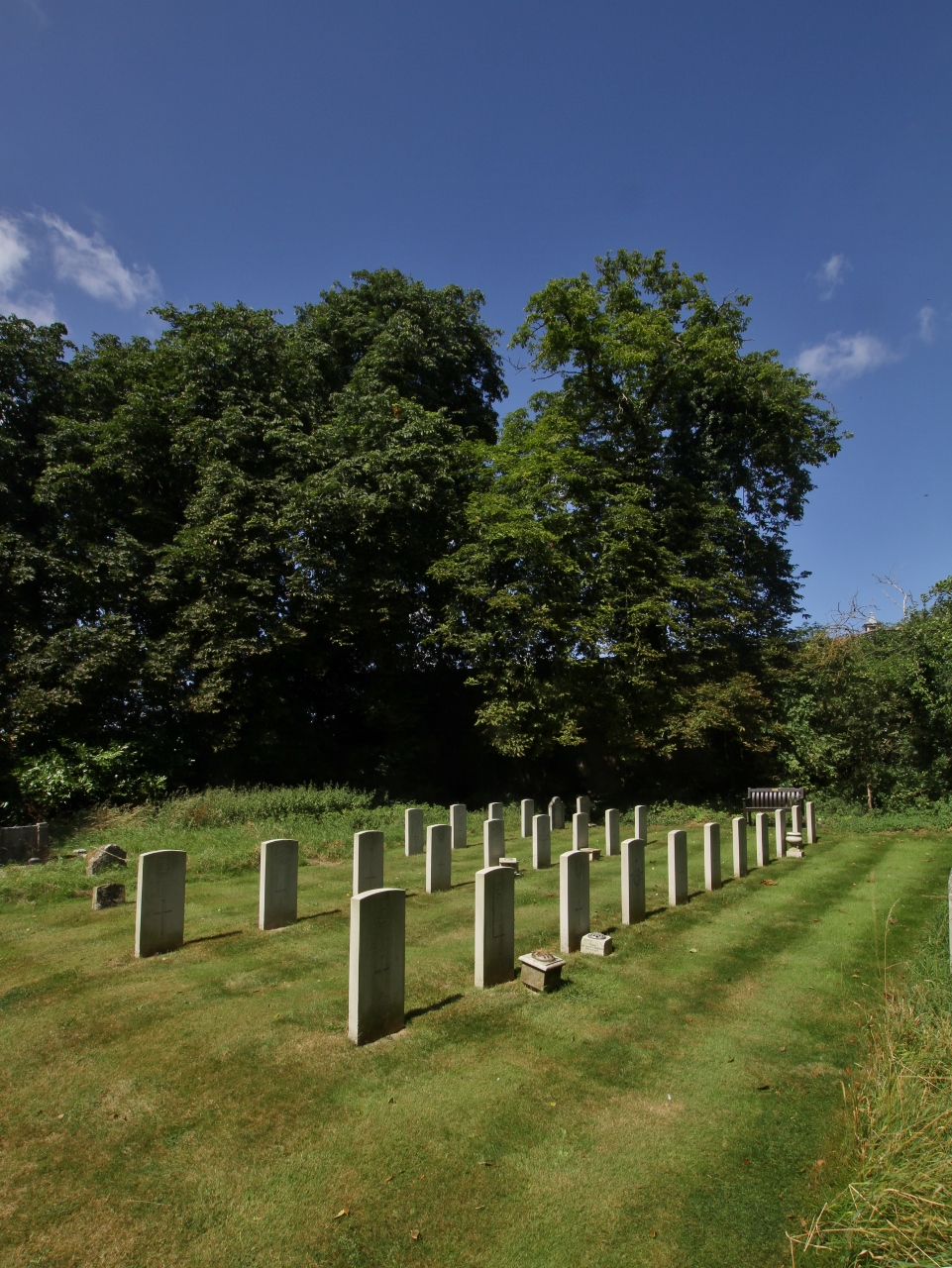
CWGC graves in St Laurence's parish churchyard

=== Commonwealth War Graves ===
St Lawrence's parish churchyard includes 25 Commonwealth War Graves connected with RAF Bicester, dating from before and during the Second World War. This was a training station for Bomber Command and a number of the burials are of airmen killed in training accidents. 19 are RAF airmen, including one Australian and one Canadian serving in the RAF. Four are RCAF airmen, one is from the RNZAF and one is a soldier from the Royal Artillery.

== Economic and social history ==
An open field system of farming prevailed in the parish until 1780, when the Stratton Audley and Caversfield Inclosure Act 1780 (20 Geo. 3. c. 50 Pr.) enabled the enclosure of the common land of the parish.

Caversfield is on the old main road between Bicester and Banbury via Aynho. The Bicester to Aynho Road Act 1791 (31 Geo. 3. c. 103) made both the Bicester–Aynho road and the Bicester–Finmere stretch of the old Roman road into turnpikes. The two roads ceased to be turnpikes in 1877. In the 1920s the Bicester–Banbury road was classified as part of the A41 and the Bicester–Finmere road was part of the A421. After the M40 motorway was completed in 1990, the Bicester–Banbury road was downgraded to B4100 and the Bicester–Finmere road was reclassified A4421.

In the 19th century Caversfield's status as an exclave of Buckinghamshire was brought to an end. The Reform Act 1832 removed the parish from the Buckingham parliamentary constituency, and in 1839 two further acts of Parliament placed exclaves such as Caversfield under their surrounding counties' magistrates and county constabularies. Finally the Counties (Detached Parts) Act 1844 transferred Caversfield to Oxfordshire for all remaining purposes.

The architect C. R. Cockerell designed Caversfield House, which was built in 1842–45 on the site of the former manor house. The architect William Wilkinson designed the neo-Tudor style Brashfield House, which was built in 1872–75 in the east of the parish by the Roman Road.

Until the 20th century Caversfield was a manor and parish with no village and a very small population. However, in 1911 Bicester Airfield was created just east of the Roman road in Launton parish. At the end of the First World War the airfield became RAF Bicester and subsequently housing for RAF personnel was built in Skimmingdish Lane in the eastern part of Caversfield parish. RAF operations ceased in 2004, and the Skimmingdish Lane accommodation is now private housing. The parish also now includes accommodation for USAFE personnel serving at the RAF Croughton communications base in Northamptonshire about 5 miles (8 km) north of Caversfield.

Late in the 20th century Bicester has been greatly expanded with new housing. Parts of the Bure Park housing estate, although in Bicester, are in Caversfield civil parish.

In 2021, the former RAF accommodation at Caversfield was adapted as private housing in a scheme called the Garden Quarter.

== Sources ==
- Page, WH, ed. (1927). A History of the County of Buckingham. Victoria County History. Vol. 4. London: The St Katherine Press. pp. 157–163.
- Sherwood, Jennifer; Pevsner, Nikolaus (1974). Oxfordshire. The Buildings of England. Harmondsworth: Penguin Books. pp. 523–524. ISBN 0-14-071045-0.
