= Rochford, Worcestershire =

Civil parish in Worcestershire, England

Coordinates: 52.312478°N 2.545216°W

Rochford
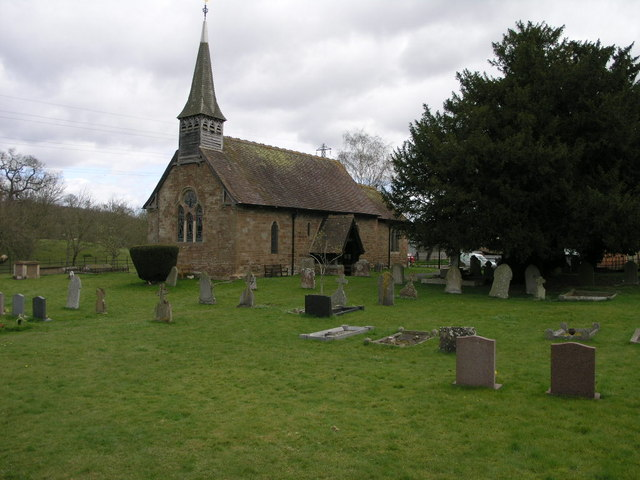
- St Michael

- Location within Worcestershire
- Population: 228
- OS grid reference: SO629684
  - London: 144mi
- Civil parish: Rochford
- District: Malvern Hills
- Shire county: Worcestershire
- Region: West Midlands
- Country: England
- Sovereign state: United Kingdom
- Post town: TENBURY WELLS
- Postcode district: WR15
- Dialling code: 01299
- Police: West Mercia
- Fire: Hereford and Worcester
- Ambulance: West Midlands
- UK Parliament: West Worcestershire

Rochford consists of two hamlets, Lower and Upper Rochford. A civil parish in the Malvern Hills District near Tenbury Wells, in the county of Worcestershire, England, Rochford is 18 miles (29 km) NW of Worcester. The River Teme, which rises in Wales, flows past Lower Rochford and joins the River Severn in Worcester. The chapelry of Rochford was an exclave of Herefordshire, part of the hundred of Wolphy. It was transferred by the Counties (Detached Parts) Act 1844 to Worcestershire.

== Etymology ==
An old English name, Rochford means 'Hunting-dog ford'. The elements of the name are ræcc A hunting dog and ford A ford'.

== History ==
In 1870–72, John Marius Wilson's Imperial Gazetteer of England and Wales described Rochford as follows:

ROCHFORD, a parish, with a village, in Tenbury district, Worcester; on the river Teme, 2¾ miles E of Tenbury r[ailway]. station. It has a post-office under Tenbury. Acres, 1,379. Real property, £2,150. Pop[ulation]., 315. Houses, 66. The property is divided among a few. The living is a rectory in the diocese of Hereford. Value, £400. Patron, J. P. Jones, Esq. The church is Norman, and was restored and enlarged in 1865. There are a national school, and charities £8.

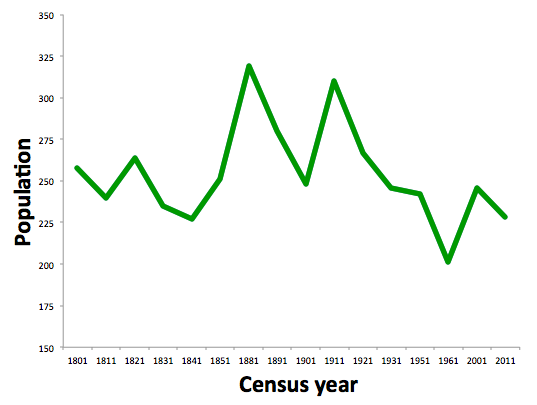
Population graph of Rochford, 1801 – 2011

The Domesday Book (1086) entry for Rochford shows it was part of the Wolfhay Hundred 'It had a population of 19 households (population likely to be 5 times greater), and a total tax assessed of 2.8 geld units'. The value of Lord Leofnoth in 1066 was £'2,' however his value reduced to '£1.5 in 1086.' Villagers paid rent to the lord, amongst other costs.

Rochford has a small population which has fluctuated between 201 and 319 people. Population data from the first UK census (1801) showed that the population was 258; and it peaked at 319 in 1881. The lowest population recorded by the census was in 1961, when the population had fallen to 201; the census data also shows that between the last two censuses, 2001 and 2011 the population was reducing. Records show that between the years 1831 and 1901, the number of vacant houses in Rochford went from zero to six, and between 1841 and 1851 a house was under construction.

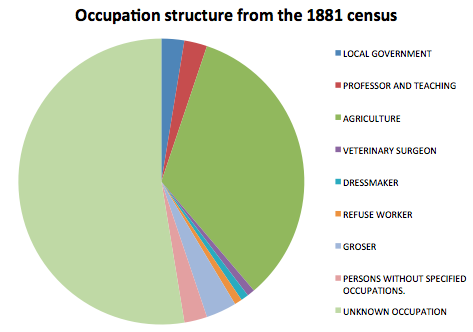
Occupation structure from the 1881 census

Historically, employment in Rochford was firmly based within the agriculture sector, which employed over 33.5% of the population in 1881. According to the 2011 census there was currently nobody employed within the agricultural sector: of the 118 people of working age in Rochford (those aged 16–74 in employment), 23.7% were skilled tradespersons and 15.3% were employed in a senior capacity as either directors or managers. The 1881 census also revealed that over 50% of the population were of unknown occupation or not in employment. The pie chart shows the types of occupations of the population of Rochford, and the percentage of the population employed in each sector.

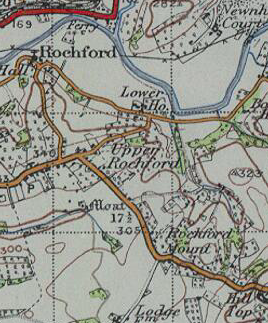
The parish of Rochford is visible on maps dating back to the 19th century, however this map extract is from the 1945 Ordnance Survey. The map shows both hamlets of Upper and Lower Rochford and the river Teme that flows beside the parish.

== St Michael's Church ==
'The church of ST. MICHAEL consists of a chancel 18 ft. 4 in. by 15 ft. 6 in., north vestry, nave 45 ft. 8 in. by 17 ft. 10 in., south porch, and wood bell-turret at the west end of the nave roof.' Parts of the chancel and the greater part of the nave date from the early years of the 12th century and the Norman features of the church include the nave and the north doorway. Restored in 1864/65 the church of St Michael is a Grade II listed building and gained its status in 1966. 'The church is built of red sandstone ashlar, which has been repaired in places, and the walls of the nave are plastered internally'. The church is located on the bank of the river Teme in Lower Rochford.

== Listed buildings ==
There are 12 listed buildings within the parish of Rochford. These include a number of cottages, farmhouses and a mansion, Old Hall. The Old Hall is a grade II listed building on Rhyse Lane, gaining its status on 6 October 1952. It was an old house dated 1704 with possible C17 or earlier origins. 'The construction of the building is Brick faced with sandstone rubble, plain tiled and large brick stack at centre of main ridge'. A majority of the buildings that are listed were constructed within the 17th century, with the exception of Parsonage Farmhouse, which was built circa 16th century.

== Modern day ==
Rochford population ranged from 0 – 94 years of age, (2011 census) with ages evenly spread throughout the range, causing roughly equal numbers of both older and younger people. 11 people were aged 51 in 2011, making that age the most common within the population, as it is nearly twice as many any other age. The census supports the idea that the population of Rochford is older and the area is home to families and older people without dependent children rather than young single people or new families as there was 49 families without dependent children in 2011 apposed to 39 with dependent children. Despite this there is still a large number of families and children within the parish including 40 people under the age of 18, proving it to be popular with families. This combined with lower than average house prices, around £10,000 cheaper than UK national average (£290,000) it is a popular and reasonably priced area to live.

== Transport ==
Like many rural villages, Rochford has limited public services close at hand. The nearest railway station, Ludlow, is about 8 miles (13 km) away, and there is no bus service: the nearest bus stop is in Tenbury Wells, more than 2 miles (2.2 km) away. As a result, car ownership is high, with 199 cars registered within the parish. 65.6% of households have access to two or more cars, as a result of the limited public transport prevision.
