= Boycott, Buckinghamshire =

Hamlet in Buckinghamshire, England

Coordinates: 52.016°N 1.040°W

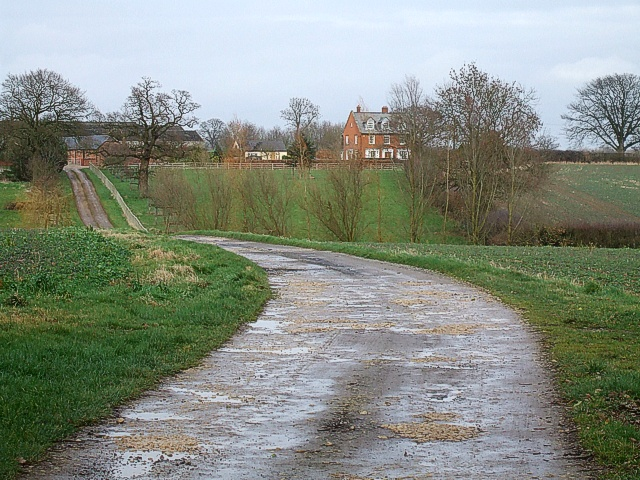
Boycott Manor Farmhouse

Boycott is a hamlet in the parish of Stowe in north Buckinghamshire, England.

Boycott was originally an Anglo Saxon settlement. Its name came from Anglo-Saxon Boiacot = either "Boia's Cottage" or "the cottage of the boys or servants". The Marquis of Buckingham annexed Boycott hamlet to the parish of Stowe in the late 18th century to provide living accommodation for his staff and servants.

Until the Counties (Detached Parts) Act 1844 Boycott was part of Oxfordshire.
