= Ackhampstead =

Coordinates: 51°36′20″N 0°50′0″W

Ackhampstead (literally 'oak homestead' in Old English) or 'The Moor' was an ancient township (or chapelry) in the Chiltern Hills, south of Lane End.

Until 1844 it was a detached part of Oxfordshire in the parish of Lewknor, part of a division of the parish known as Lewknor Uphill consisting of three detached parts. It was transferred to Buckinghamshire by the Counties (Detached Parts) Act 1844. By the mid-nineteenth century the population of the community was negligible. The Bishop of Oxford demolished its medieval chapel and replaced it with a new church at Cadmore End. In 1885 the division of Lewknor Uphill was dismembered. Ackhampstead was transferred to the parish of Great Marlow for ecclesiastical purposes, and became part of the civil parish of Great Marlow in 1895.

In 1934 the western end, including Moor Farm, became part of the civil parish of Fingest, renamed Fingest and Lane End in 1937, and is now in Lane End parish. The greater part, including the site of the chapel and Moor Wood, remains in Great Marlow parish. A detailed history of Ackhampstead was compiled by Dr Gordon Wyatt in 1969 for the Frieth Village Society.
