= North Ambersham =

Former civil parish in West Sussex, England

Coordinates: 51.044685°N 0.698293°W

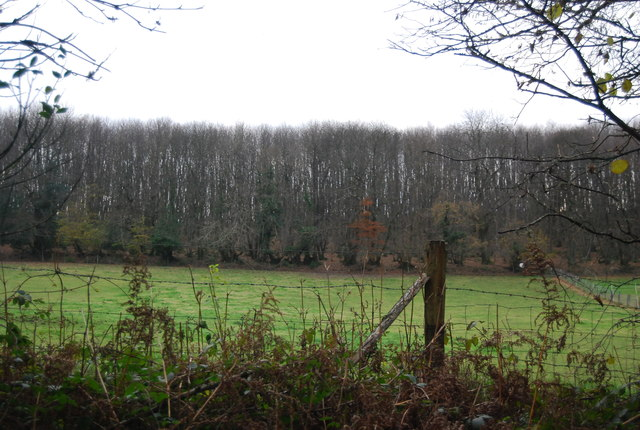
- Heathfield Hanger

- Location within West Sussex
- Civil parish: Fernhurst
- District: Chichester
- Shire county: West Sussex
- Region: South East
- Country: England
- Sovereign state: United Kingdom

North Ambersham is a former civil parish, now in the parish of Fernhurst, in the Chichester district of West Sussex, England. Until 1844 North Ambersham was a detached part of Hampshire and was a tithing of the parish of Steep. Under the Parliamentary Boundaries Act 1832 (2 & 3 Will. 4. c. 64) and the Counties (Detached Parts) Act 1844 (7 & 8 Vict. c. 61), it was annexed to Sussex. For ecclesiastical purposes this tithing was attached to Fernhurst. In 1866 North Ambersham became a separate civil parish, on 1 April 1972 the parish was abolished and merged with Fernhurst. In 1971 the parish had a population of 176.
