= Hunnington =

Village in Worcestershire, England

Coordinates: 52.429248°N 2.051568°W

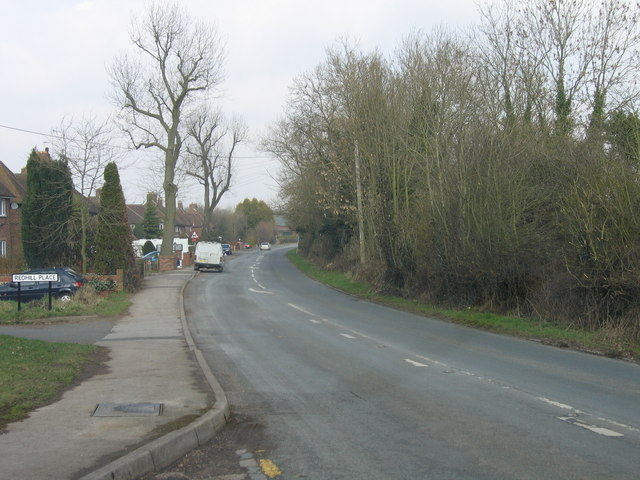

- Location within Worcestershire
- Population: 552
- Civil parish: Hunnington
- District: Bromsgrove
- Shire county: Worcestershire
- Region: West Midlands
- Country: England
- Sovereign state: United Kingdom
- Post town: Halesowen
- Postcode district: B62
- Police: West Mercia
- Fire: Hereford and Worcester
- Ambulance: West Midlands
- UK Parliament: Bromsgrove

Hunnington is a village and civil parish in the Bromsgrove District of Worcestershire, England, close to the border with West Midlands, and just south of Halesowen. According to the 2001 census the parish had a population of 552.

== History ==
The name Hunnington derives from either the Old English Hunatūn meaning 'Huna's settlement', or hunigtūn meaning 'honey settlement'.

It was originally a township in the parish of Halesowen, a detached part of Shropshire, and was transferred to the jurisdiction of Worcestershire in 1844. It became a parish in its own right in the 19th century, and became part of the Bromsgrove Rural District in 1894 under the Local Government Act 1894, and then of Bromsgrove District under the Local Government Act 1972 from 1974. Hunnington was formerly on the Halesowen Railway that had services withdrawn in 1960 and was dismantled in 1964.
