= Illey =

Village England

Coordinates: 52.433575°N 2.027192°W

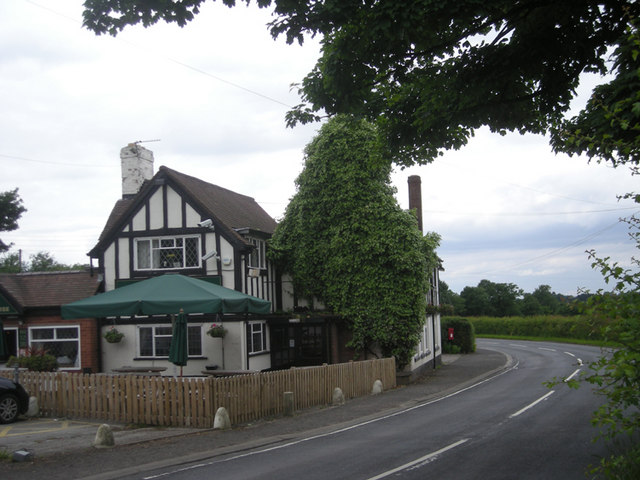
- The Black Horse

- Location within the West Midlands
- Metropolitan borough: Dudley
- Metropolitan county: West Midlands
- Region: West Midlands
- Country: England
- Sovereign state: United Kingdom
- Post town: Halesowen
- Postcode district: B62
- Police: West Midlands
- Fire: West Midlands
- Ambulance: West Midlands

Illey is a hamlet south of Halesowen in the Dudley district, in the county of the West Midlands, England.

== History ==
The name Illey derives from the Old English Hillalēah meaning 'Hilla's wood/clearing'.

Illey was historically a township in the ancient parish of Halesowen. It was one of the parts of Halesowen transferred from Worcestershire to Shropshire in the Middle Ages, remaining a detached part of Shropshire until it was returned to Worcestershire in 1844. Illey became a separate civil parish in 1866. From 1894 to 1925 it was part of Halesowen Rural District. In 1925 it was incorporated into the municipal borough of Halesowen. It remained a civil parish until 1974, but as an urban parish it had no parish council of its own after 1925, being directly administered by Halesowen Town Council. In 1951 the parish had a population of 133. The parish was abolished in 1974 along with the borough of Halesowen, becoming part of the wider metropolitan borough of Dudley.
