= Buckingham Hundred =

Historical region in England

Coordinates: 51.9956°N 0.9868°W

- Area
  - 1887: 52,251 acres (211.45 km^{2})
- Population
  - 1887: 9,455
- History
  - Created: 11th century
  - Abolished: 1880s
- Status: Hundred
  - HQ: Various
- Subdivisions
  - Type: Parishes

Buckingham Hundred was a hundred in the ceremonial county of Buckinghamshire, England. It was situated in the north west of the county and forming the boundary with the counties of Oxfordshire and Northamptonshire. There was also a small detached portion of the hundred embedded in Oxfordshire close to Bicester.

== History ==
Until at least the time of the Domesday Survey in 1086 there were 18 hundreds in Buckinghamshire. It has been suggested however that neighbouring hundreds had already become more closely associated in the 11th century and around 1316 the original or ancient hundreds had been consolidated into 8 larger hundreds. Buckingham became the name of the hundred formed from the combined 11th century hundreds of Lamva, Rovelai and Stodfald although these original names still persisted in official records until at least the early part of the 17th century. The court leet for Buckingham hundred was every three weeks at various localities across the hundred.

Stodfald Hundred's name came from Old English stōdfald 'enclosure for a stud of horses', named after a field in Lamport where the hundred court met.

Rovelai Hundred was named after Old English Ruh hlaw, 'uncultivated hill', lately Rowley Hills, in Lenborough, where the hundred court met.

Lamva Hundred was named after Old English muga, 'a heap' e.g. of hay, with the Norman French 'La' later prefixed, an artificial mound used to mark the meeting place of the hundred court, traditionally reported to be Park Meadow in Steeple Claydon.

== Parishes and hamlets ==
Buckingham hundred comprised the following ancient parishes and hamlets, (formerly medieval vills), allocated to their respective 11th century hundred:

Lamua	Rovelai	Stodfald
Addington	Barton Hartshorn	Akeley
Adstock	Beachampton	Biddlesden with Evershaw
Edgcott	‡Bourton	Foscott
Marsh Gibbon	‡Buckingham	Leckhampstead
Padbury	*Caversfield	Lillingstone Dayrell
Steeple Claydon	Chetwode	Lillingstone Lovell
Thornborough	‡Gawcott	Luffield Abbey
Twyford (with Charndon and Poundon)	Hillesden	Maids Moreton
	‡Lenborough	Radclive
	Preston Bissett	Shalstone
	Tingewick	Stowe (with Dadford and Lamport)
	†Thornton	Turweston
		Water Stratford
		Westbury

† Thornton was later transferred to the hundred of Lamua.

* Caversfield was a detached parish located within Oxfordshire and was transferred to that county in the 19th century

‡ Buckingham was part of Rovelai hundred for administrative purposes even though by the 11th century it had become a substantial settlement and the town and was granted Borough status in the 16th century. Bourton, Gawcott and Lenborough were part of the parish of Buckingham.

== See also ==
- List of hundreds of England and Wales
