= John Fane, 7th Earl of Westmorland =

British Army officer and politician (1685–1762)

General The Right Honourable The Earl of Westmorland
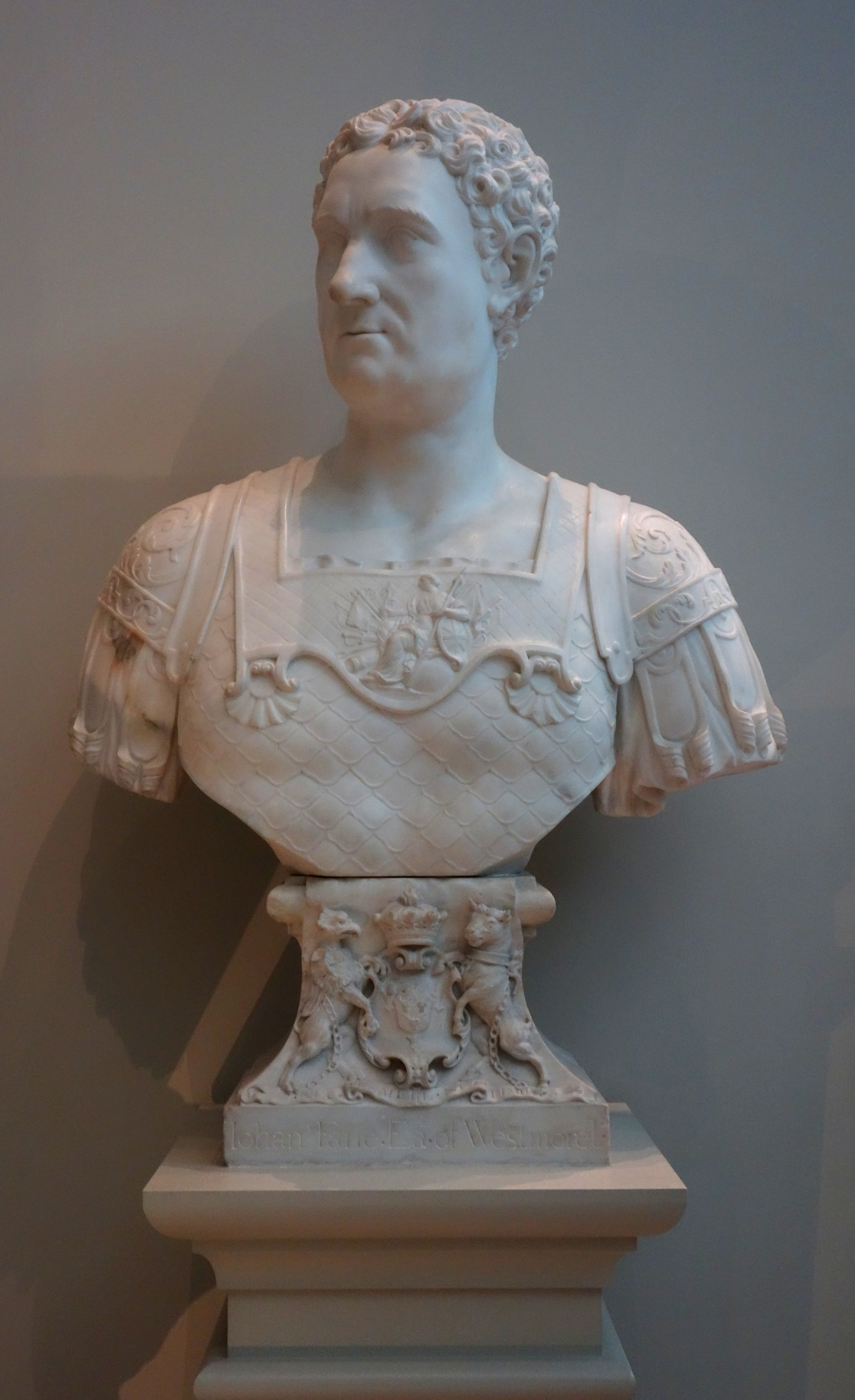
- Bust by Thomas Ady

Member of Parliament for Buckingham
- In office March 1727 – 1728 Serving with William Heathcote; Thomas Lewis; George Chamberlayne
- Monarchs: George I George II
- Preceded by: William Heathcote; Richard Grenville
- Succeeded by: George Chamberlayne; Richard Grenville

Member of Parliament for Kent
- In office September 1715 – 1722 Serving with William Delaune
- Monarch: George I
- Preceded by: Mildmay Fane
- Succeeded by: Sir Edward Knatchbull; Sir Thomas Twisden

Member of Parliament for Hythe
- In office 1708–1711 Serving with John Boteler; The Viscount Shannon
- Monarch: Anne
- Preceded by: Sir Philip Boteler; John Boteler
- Succeeded by: John Boteler; William Berners

Chancellor of the University of Oxford
- In office 1759–1762
- Preceded by: The Earl of Arran
- Succeeded by: The Earl of Lichfield

Personal details
- Born: John Fane; 24 March 1685
- Died: 26 August 1762 (aged 77)
- Spouse: Mary Cavendish
- Parent(s): Vere Fane, 4th Earl of Westmorland; Rachel Bence

Military service
- Allegiance: Great Britain
- Branch/service: British Army
- Years of service: 1709–1761
- Rank: General
- Commands: John Fane's Regiment of Foot; 1st Troop Horse Grenadier Guards; His Majesty's Own Troop of Horse Guards
- Battles/wars: Battle of Oudenarde; Siege of Lille; Battle of Malplaquet

John Fane, 7th Earl of Westmorland (24 March 1685 – 26 August 1762), styled The Honourable John Fane from 1691 to 1733 and Lord Catherlough from 1733 to 1736, of Mereworth Castle in Kent, was a British Army officer and politician who sat in the House of Commons in three separate stretches between 1708 and 1734.

== Origins ==
He was the son of Vere Fane, 4th Earl of Westmorland by his wife Rachel Bence. He succeeded both his childless elder brothers, namely Vere Fane, 5th Earl of Westmorland and Thomas Fane, 6th Earl of Westmorland.

== Inheritance ==
Since Fane outlived many of his siblings, including Vere Fane, 5th Earl of Westmorland and Thomas Fane, 6th Earl of Westmorland, and was the only heir male, he inherited most of their properties. His wealth increased further with an inheritance from his younger brother Mildmay Fane and with the revenue from his Caterlough barony.

== Career ==
He commenced his law studies at Lincoln's Inn in 1703 and entered as a fellow commoner at Emmanuel College, Cambridge in 1703/4. It is likely that his older brother Thomas influenced his decision to become Member of Parliament for Hythe in 1708, a position which he held until 1711. That same year, he joined the army and fought at Oudenarde and Lille. After the war, he returned to England with a letter for the Lord High Treasurer, Lord Godolphin, from the Duke of Marlborough, who wrote that "Fane behaved himself very well, so that I am desirous you would do him the honour of presenting him to the Queen. I like him much better than his brother [Westmorland]." A year later, however, he left for the continent again, this time as a Captain of horse in William Cardogan's regiment, and saw action at Malplaquet.

In 1709 and 1710, he was re-elected as Member of Parliament for Hythe, but he was forced to relinquish his seat in 1711 due to a petition by Tory candidates. He later became Member of Parliament for Kent from 1715 to 1722, and for Buckingham from 1727 to 1734. While originally a Whig, Fane changed sides and became a Tory during the reign of George II. He may also have been involved in Jacobite intrigues.

During his service in the British Army, Fane reached the rank of colonel in the 1st Troop, Horse Guards, and that of general in 1761. He was created 1st Baron Catherlough of Catherlough in Ireland on 4 October 1733 and succeeded his elder brother as 7th Earl of Westmorland in 1736. He is also notable for having commissioned Colen Campbell to build his Palladian seat at Mereworth Castle in Kent.

== Marriage ==
In 1716 he married Mary Cavendish (1700-1778), only daughter and heiress of Lord Henry Cavendish, MP (by his wife Rhoda Cartwright, a daughter of William Cartwright, of Aynho, Northamptonshire), 2nd son of William Cavendish, 1st Duke of Devonshire. Without issue.

== Death and succession ==
When Fane died without issue in 1762, his Irish barony became extinct; the barony of Le Despencer, being a barony in fee, devolved upon his nephew Sir Francis Dashwood, Bt; and the earldom of Westmorland went to the heir male, Thomas Fane of Bristol, a merchant, son of Henry Fane (d. 1726,) attorney-at-law, grandson of Sir Francis Fane, KB and great-grandson of Sir Francis Fane, of Fulbeck, Lincolnshire, KB the third son of Francis Fane, 1st Earl of Westmorland.

== Arms ==
Coat of arms of John Fane, 7th Earl of Westmorland
Crest Out of a ducal coronet Or, a bull's head Argent pied Sable, armed of the first, charged on the neck with a rose Gules barbed and seeded Proper. Escutcheon Azure three dexter gauntlets backs affrontée Or. Supporters Dexter: a griffin per fesse Argent and Or, gorged with a plain collar and lined Sable; Sinister: a bull Argent pied Sable collared and lined Or, at the end of the line a ring and three staples of the last. Motto "NE VILE FANO" (Disgrace not the altar)

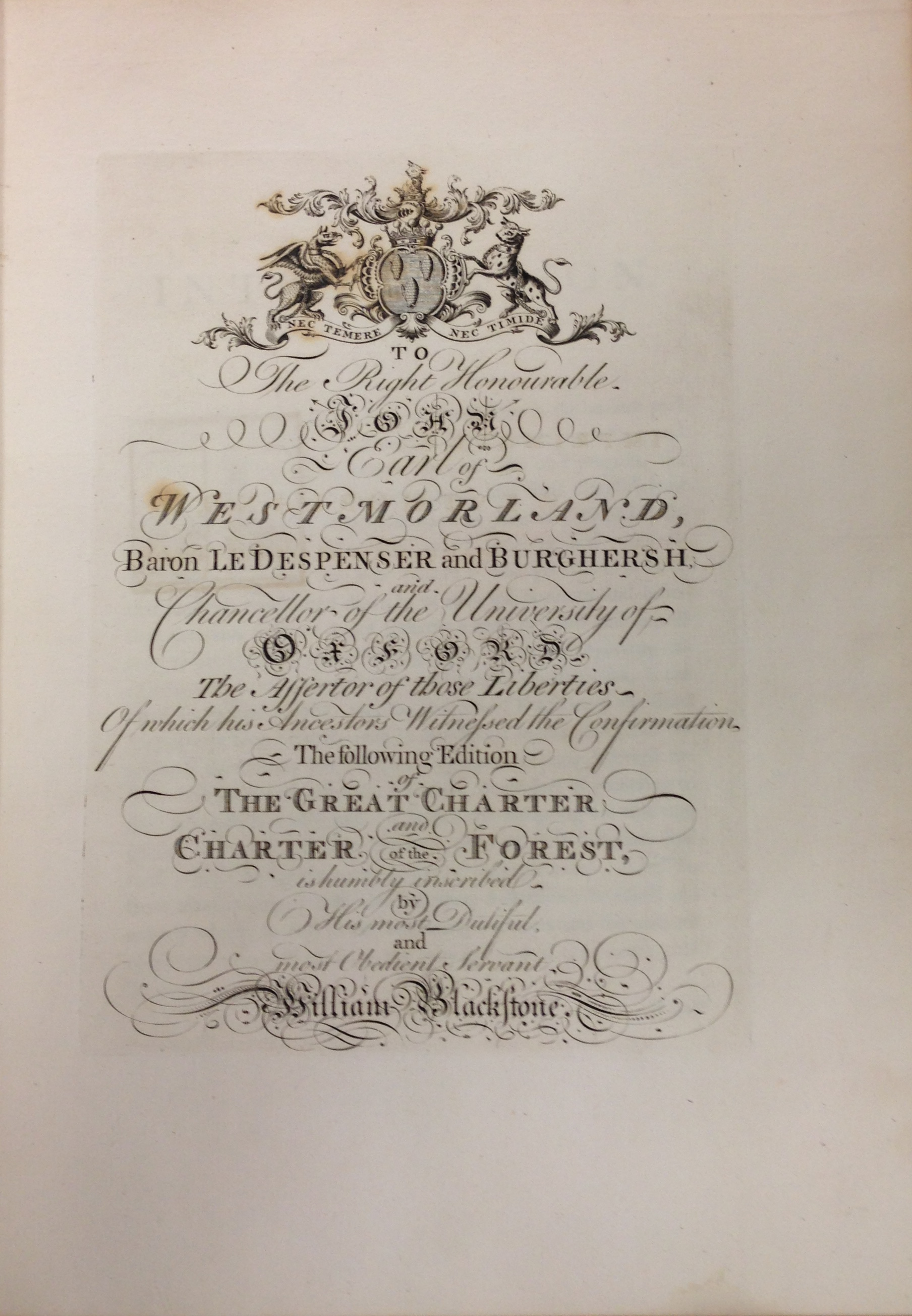
The dedication page on the first edition of William Blackstone's work The Great Charter and Charter of the Forest (1759). Blackstone dedicated the book to Westmorland, calling him "The Assertor of those Liberties" set down in Magna Carta and other charters "[o]f which his Ancestors Witnessed the Confirmation".

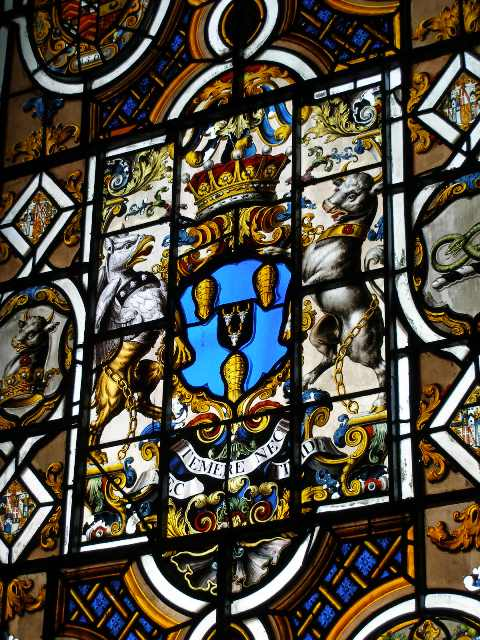
Arms of John Fane, 7th Earl of Westmorland with inescutcheon of pretence of Cavendish (Sable, three buck's heads cabossed argent), Mereworth Church, Kent

== Literature ==
- Blackstone, William (1759). The Great Charter and Charter of the Forest, with other Authentic Instruments: To which is Prefixed an Introductory Discourse, Containing the History of the Charters. By William Blackstone, Esq; Barrister at Law, Vinerian Professor of the Laws of England, and D.C.L. Oxford: Clarendon Press. OCLC 4547269.
- Debrett, John, ed. (1820). Debrett's Correct Peerage of England, Scotland, and Ireland. Vol. 1 (13 ed.). London: Printed G. Woodall, Angel Court, Skinner Street.
- Mosley, Charles, ed. (2003). Burke's Peerage, Baronetage & Knightage. Vol. 3 (107th ed.). Wilmington, Delaware: Burke's Peerage (Genealogical Books) Ltd.
- Ruffhead, Owen (1763). The Statutes at Large, From the Tenth Year of KING WILLIAM the THIRD To the End of the Reign of QUEEN ANNE. To which is prefixed, A TABLE of the TITLES of all the Publick and Private Statutes during that Time. Vol. 4. London: Mark & Robert Basket, Henry Woodfall & William Strahan.
- Wynne, Sonya (2002). "FANE, Hon. John (1686-1762), of Mereworth, Kent; Apethorpe, Northants. and Hanover Square, London". The History of Parliament.
- Wynne, Sonya (2006). Hayton, D. W.; Cruickshanks, Eveline; Handley, Stuart (eds.). The History of Parliament: the House of Commons 1690-1715 (Hardcover). Cambridge University Press. ISBN 978-0521772211.

Parliament of Great Britain
Preceded by Sir Philip Boteler, Bt; John Boteler	Member of Parliament for Hythe with John Boteler 1708–1710; The Viscount Shannon 1710–1711; 1708–1711	Succeeded by John Boteler; William Berners
Preceded by Mildmay Fane; William Delaune	Member of Parliament for Kent; 1715–1722; With: William Delaune	Succeeded by Sir Edward Knatchbull, Bt; Sir Thomas Twisden, Bt
Preceded by Richard Grenville; William Heathcote	Member of Parliament for Buckingham; 1727–1728; With: William Heathcote 1727; Thomas Lewis 1727–1728; George Chamberlayne 1728	Succeeded by George Chamberlayne; Richard Grenville
Military offices
Preceded by William Windress	Colonel of John Fane's Regiment of Foot; 1715–1717	Succeeded by Viscount Hinchingbrooke
Preceded by Lord Lumley	Captain and Colonel of the 1st Troop Horse Grenadier Guards; 1717–1733	Succeeded by Sir Robert Rich, Bt
Preceded by The Earl of Pembroke	Captain and Colonel of His Majesty's Own Troop of Horse Guards; 1733–1737	Succeeded by The Duke of Montagu
Academic offices
Preceded by The Earl of Arran	Chancellor of the University of Oxford; 1759–1762	Succeeded by The Earl of Lichfield
Peerage of England
Preceded by Thomas Fane	Earl of Westmorland; 1736–1762	Succeeded by Thomas Fane
Peerage of Ireland
New creation	Baron Catherlough; 1733–1762	Extinct
