= Vere Fane, 4th Earl of Westmorland =

British earl

The Right Honourable The Earl of Westmorland KB DL
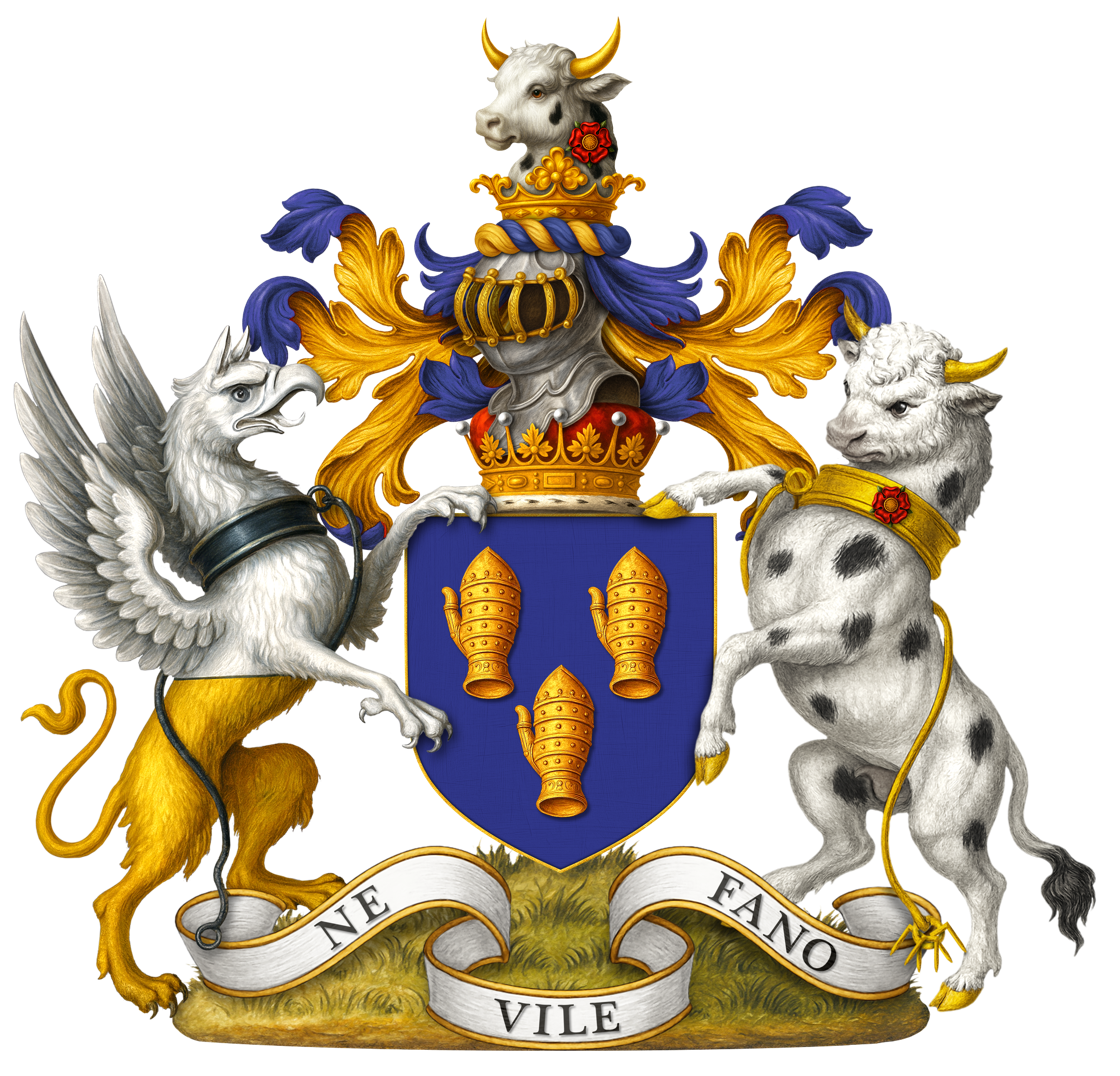

Member of Parliament for Peterborough
- In office 22 March 1671 – 24 January 1679
- Monarch: Charles II
- Preceded by: Sir Humphrey Orme
- Succeeded by: The Lord FitzWilliam

Member of Parliament for Kent
- In office March 1679 – March 1681 Serving with Sir Edward Dering
- Monarch: Charles II
- Preceded by: Sir Thomas Peyton
- Succeeded by: Sir William Twysden
- In office 1689 – 18 September 1691 Serving with Sir John Knatchbull
- Monarch: Charles II
- Preceded by: Sir William Twysden
- Succeeded by: Sir Thomas Roberts

Lord Lieutenant of Kent
- In office 1692–1693 Serving with The Viscount Sydney
- Monarchs: William III and Mary II
- Preceded by: The Viscount Sydney
- Succeeded by: The Viscount Sydney

Personal details
- Born: Vere Fane; 13 February 1644 Lamport Hall, Lamport, Buckinghamshire
- Died: 29 December 1693 (aged 49)
- Spouse: Rachel Bence (1671–1693)
- Children: 11, including: Vere Fane; Thomas Fane; John Fane; Mildmay Fane
- Parent(s): Mildmay Fane, 2nd Earl of Westmorland; Grace Thornhurst
- Relatives: Charles Fane, 3rd Earl of Westmorland (brother)
- Awards: Knight of the Bath

Vere Fane, 4th Earl of Westmorland KB DL (13 February 1645 – 29 December 1693), styled The Honourable Vere Fane from 1644 to 1661 and Sir Vere Fane from 1661 to 1691, was an English peer and Member of Parliament for Peterborough and twice for Kent.

== Family ==
Vere Fane was born on 13 February 1645 in Lamport Hall, Lamport, Buckinghamshire as the second son of Mildmay Fane, 2nd Earl of Westmorland and his wife Mary Vere; he was the younger half-brother of Charles Fane. As Charles died without issue in 1691, Vere inherited the Earldom of Westmorland. On 13 July 1671, Fane married Rachel Bence, daughter of John Bence and Judith Andrews, at Allhallows', London. The couple had eleven children:

- Lady Rachel Fane
- Lady Catherine Fane (whose great-grandson would become the 12th Lord le Despencer). She married (marriage licence dated 21 February 1696) William Paul (1673–1711), of Bray, Berkshire. One of their co-heiress daughters married Sir William Stapleton, 4th Baronet.
- Lady Elizabeth Fane
- Lady Susan Fane
- Lady Rachel Fane
- Lady Mary Dashwood, mother to Francis Dashwood, who inherited the Le Despencer barony upon the death of John Fane
- John Fane (died in infancy)
- Vere Fane, 5th Earl of Westmorland (1678-1698)
- Thomas Fane, 6th Earl of Westmorland (1681–1736)
- John Fane, 7th Earl of Westmorland (1686–1762)
- The Honourable Mildmay Fane (1689–1715)

Fane died on 29 December 1693, probably from complications that arose from diabetes. His oldest surviving son Vere inherited his father's earldom and further titles, but died without issue before reaching the age of 20.

== Career ==
As was common in his family (his grandfather Francis, his father Mildmay and his older brother Charles had been Members of Parliament before they became earl; his sons John and Mildmay would do so as well), Vere Fane served as a Member of Parliament. From 1671 to 1671, he was Member of Parliament for Peterborough; the year his Kent office ended, he became Member of Parliament for Kent, an office which he held until 1681. From 1689 to 1691, he was again Member of Parliament for Kent. He was classed as a Whig, but it seems that he was not particularly active. At the coronation of King Charles II on 23 April 1661, he was invested as a Knight of the Bath.

After the death of his brother Charles, who had no issue, on 18 September 1691, Vere Fane inherited the Earldom of Westmorland as well as his brother's further titles Baron Burghersh and Lord le Despencer.

== Arms ==
Coat of arms of Vere Fane, 4th Earl of Westmorland
Crest Out of a ducal coronet Or, a bull's head Argent pied Sable, armed of the first, charged on the neck with a rose Gules barbed and seeded Proper. Escutcheon Azure three dexter gauntlets backs affrontée Or. Supporters Dexter: a griffin per fesse Argent and Or, gorged with a plain collar and lined Sable; Sinister: a bull Argent pied Sable collared and lined Or, at the end of the line a ring and three staples of the last. Motto "NE VILE FANO" (Disgrace not the altar)

== Literature ==
- Cokayne, George Edward (1983) [1900]. The Complete Baronetage. Vol. 3. Gloucester: Alan Sutton Publishing.
- Cokayne, George Edward; Gibbs, Vicary; Doubleday, Herbert Arthur; White, Geoffrey Henllan; Scott-Ellis, Thomas Evelyn (2000) [1910]. The Complete Peerage of England, Scotland, Ireland, Great Britain and the United Kingdom, Extant, Extinct or Dormant, new ed. Vol. 3. Gloucester: Alan Sutton Publishing.
- Debrett, John, ed. (1820). Debrett's Correct Peerage of England, Scotland, and Ireland. Vol. 1 (13 ed.). London: Printed G. Woodall, Angel Court, Skinner Street.
- Henning, Basil Duke (1983). "FANE, Sir Vere (1645-93), of Mereworth, Kent". The History of Parliament. Archived from the original on 28 March 2024.
- Mosley, Charles, ed. (2003). Burke's Peerage, Baronetage & Knightage. Vol. 3 (107th ed.). Wilmington, Delaware: Burke's Peerage (Genealogical Books) Ltd.
- Naylor, George, ed. (1888). The registers of the parish of Thorington in the county of Suffolk : with notes of the different acts of Parliament referring to them, and notices of the Bence family, with pedigree, and other families whose names appear therein. London: Mitchell and Hughes.
- Wynne, Sonya (2002). "FANE, Hon. Sir Vere (1645-93), of Apethorpe, Northants. and Mereworth, Kent". The History of Parliament. Archived from the original on 21 September 2015.
- Wynne, Sonya (2006). Hayton, D. W.; Cruickshanks, Eveline; Handley, Stuart (eds.). The History of Parliament: the House of Commons 1690-1715 (Hardcover). Cambridge University Press. ISBN 978-0521772211.
- Ormrod, David (1994). Yates, Nigel; Gibson, James M. (eds.). Traffic and Politics: The Construction and Management of Rochester Bridge AD 43-1993. Woodbridge: The Boydell Press. ISBN 0-85115-356-9.

Parliament of England
Preceded by Sir Humphrey Orme; The Lord FitzWilliam	Member of Parliament for Peterborough; 1671–1679; With: The Lord FitzWilliam	Succeeded by The Lord FitzWilliam; Francis St John
Preceded by Sir John Tufton; Sir Thomas Peyton, Bt	Member of Parliament for Kent; 1679–1685; With: Sir Edward Dering, Bt	Succeeded by Sir William Twysden, Bt; Sir John Knatchbull, Bt
Preceded by Sir William Twysden, Bt; Sir John Knatchbull, Bt	Member of Parliament for Kent; 1689–1691; With: Sir John Knatchbull, Bt	Succeeded by Sir John Knatchbull, Bt; Sir Thomas Roberts, Bt
Honorary titles
Preceded by The Viscount Sydney	Lord Lieutenant of Kent; 1692–1693; Served alongside: The Viscount Sydney	Succeeded by The Viscount Sydney
Peerage of England
Preceded by Charles Fane	Earl of Westmorland; 1691–1693	Succeeded by Vere Fane
