= Hillesden =

Village in Buckinghamshire, England

Coordinates: 51.9582°N 1.0046°W

- Location within Buckinghamshire
- Population: 216 (2011)
- OS grid reference: SP678302
- Civil parish: Hillesden
- Unitary authority: Buckinghamshire
- Ceremonial county: Buckinghamshire
- Region: South East
- Country: England
- Sovereign state: United Kingdom
- Post town: BUCKINGHAM
- Postcode district: MK18
- Dialling code: 01296
- Police: Thames Valley
- Fire: Buckinghamshire
- Ambulance: South Central
- UK Parliament: Buckingham and Bletchley

Hillesden is a village and civil parish in north-west Buckinghamshire, England, about 4 miles (6.4 km) south of Buckingham.

The village name is Anglo-Saxon in origin, recorded as Hildesdun (Hild's hill). In a later century, the Domesday Book of 1086 recorded the village as Ilesdone, within the ancient hundred of Rowley ("Rovelai"). Hillesden has been within Buckingham Hundred since about 1316 when the nearby hundreds consolidated.

Hillesden is split up into three areas; Church End, The Orchard and The Barracks. Church End is situated at the top of the hill and surrounds the church. The Orchard consists of Orchard Cottages and Orchard View, whilst The Barracks are situated across from Great Ground.

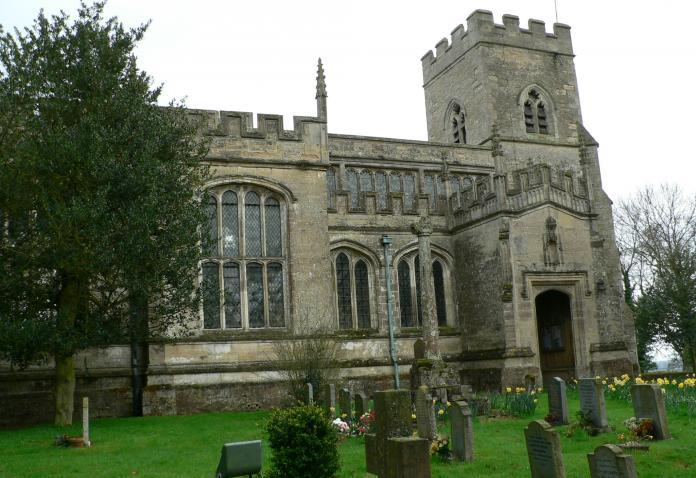
North side view of All Saints church, Hillesden.

The 15th century parish church in Hillesden is dedicated to All Saints and is a grade I listed building. The tithes of the church were anciently collected by Christ Church, Oxford. The Irish judge Godfrey Boate, subject of a famous mocking elegy by Jonathan Swift, is buried here (he had married into the Dentons, the local landowning family).

Hillesden was the home of the Denton family. During the English Civil War the manor house at Hillesden, was owned by Sir Alexander Denton, Member of Parliament for Buckingham. Denton was a Royalist and his house at Hillesden became a focal point in the conflict. In January 1644 Parliamentary forces occupied Hillesden House but they were ejected. In early February Colonel William Smith garrisoned Hillesden House with about 260 men to support the King at Oxford. The house was occupied by many of the Denton family and some of the Verney family and Sir Alexander also arrived at the house by chance. A force of over 2000 men under Oliver Cromwell and Samuel Luke laid siege to the house at the beginning of March. After the surrender Smith and Denton were taken prisoner and moved to the Tower of London, while the house was destroyed and the family beggared. Denton died a prisoner on New Years Day 1645. The medieval church, built in 1493 was saved from the ravages of war, however, and remains to this day along with Parliamentary bullet holes in its door.
