= Mildmay Fane =

British politician

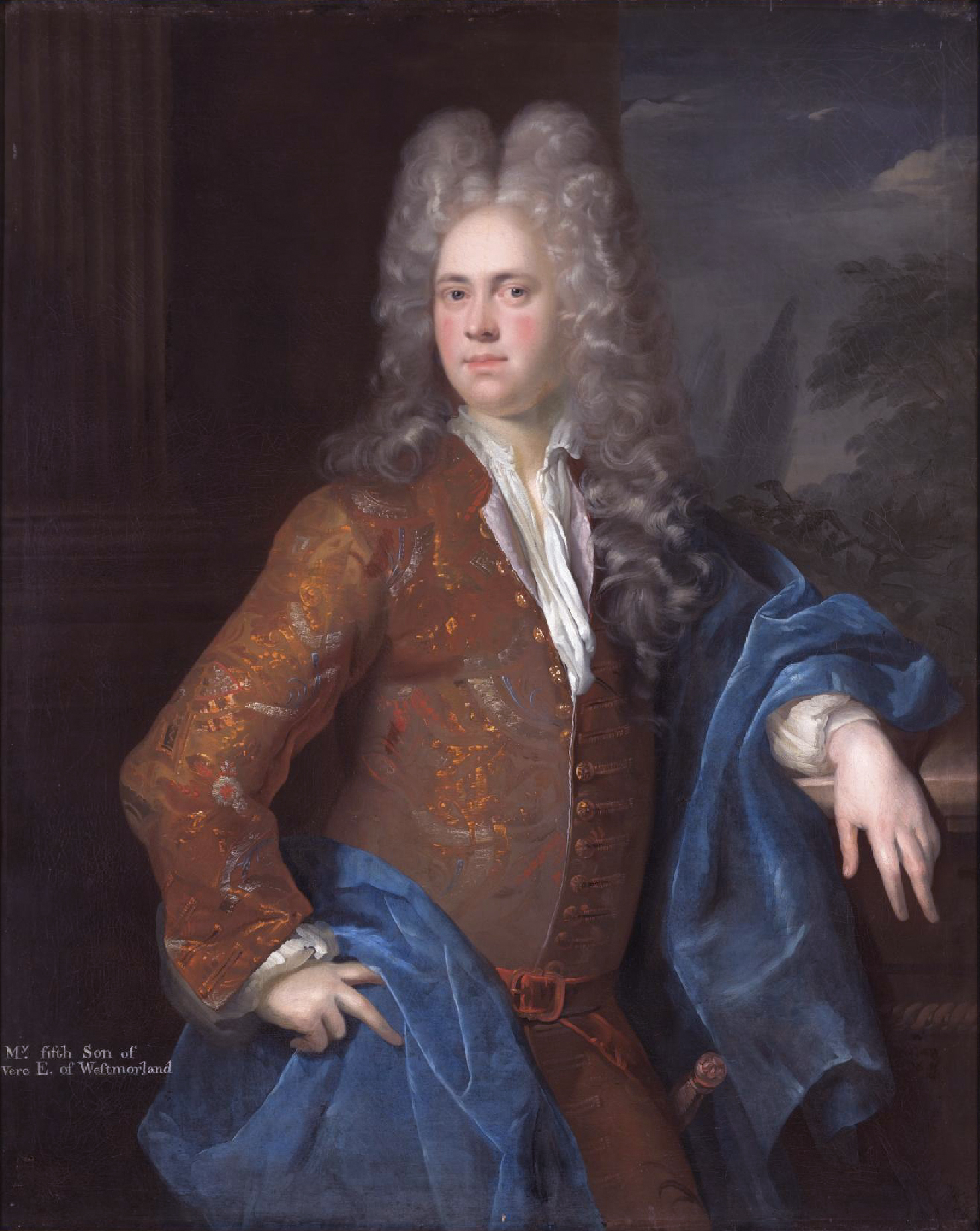
Mildmay Fane (Alexis-Simon Belle)

Mildmay Fane (c. October 1689 – 11 September 1715) was a British politician who sat in the House of Commons for 8 months in 1715, before his early death.

Fane was the fifth son of Vere Fane, 4th Earl of Westmorland and his wife Rachel, daughter of John Bence. Baptized on 31 October 1689, he inherited the estate of Burston, Hunton, Kent from his cousin Thomas Fane in 1692.

Fane unsuccessfully contested Kent as a Whig in the 1713 election, being beaten by a margin of about 600 votes of about 5000 cast. After the death of Queen Anne, he contested the seat again in the 1715 election. He and William Delaune were returned on 8 February, beating the sitting Tory members by a margin of about 200 votes of about 6200 cast. The change of administration, which transferred Government patronage at the Chatham dockyards and the Cinque Ports from the Tories to the Whigs, was critical in swinging the election.

Fane did not long survive his election, dying unmarried on 11 September. He left his lands to his brother, Col. John Fane, who replaced him as member for Kent in an uncontested by-election.

Parliament of Great Britain
Preceded by Sir Edward Knatchbull, Bt; Percival Hart	Member of Parliament for Kent; February–September 1715; With: William Delaune	Succeeded by Hon. John Fane; William Delaune
