= Boate family =

The Boate (also called Boot or de Boot) family was a prominent Irish family of Dutch origin and noble ancestry which left the Dutch Republic and became closely associated with England then Ireland's leadership since the first half of the 17th century. The family produced two distinguished doctors and writers, and an Irish High Court judge. One branch of the family settled in County Tipperary where they became substantial landowners.

== History ==
Godefrid or Godefroy de Boot, knight, of Gorinchem (c.1570-1625) married Christine van Loon. They had two sons, Gerard and Arnold. Both brothers studied at the University of Leiden, where they qualified as doctors. They moved to London, and subsequently to Ireland. Arnold was personal physician to Robert Sidney, 2nd Earl of Leicester, and later to James Ussher, Archbishop of Armagh; he was also Surgeon General to the Irish Army, and his experiences as an army doctor provided the material for two of his books. The brothers collaborated on a work on philosophy, Philosophia Naturalis Reformata, a refutation of Aristotle and Arnold supplied the material for Gerard's best-known work, The Natural History of Ireland. Arnold's great interest was in Hebrew studies, on which he published several works. His most famous book was The Character of a Truly Virtuous and Pious Woman, a loving tribute to his wife Margaret Dongan, daughter of the Irish judge Thomas Dongan. Both brothers were members of the Hartlib circle, the circle of writers who corresponded with Samuel Hartlib on religion, science and philosophy.

Due to the disturbed conditions in Ireland following the Irish Rebellion of 1641, Arnold moved to Paris, where he died in 1653. Gerard moved to Ireland to take up a medical post in Dublin, where he died in 1650: in consideration for the substantial sums of money which Gerard had donated for the suppression of the Irish Rebellion his widow, Catherine Menning, was granted certain lands in Tipperary, to pass on her death to the eldest son, Gerard.

== Last of the Boates ==
Since Arnold's only surviving child, as far as is known, was a daughter, Mariana, the Godfrey Boate who was described as a clerk in Chancery was almost certainly a younger son of Gerard and Katherine Boate. This Godfrey was the father of Godfrey Boate junior, who became a High Court judge, and whose conduct of a trial for seditious libel so enraged Jonathan Swift that on the judge's death in 1722 he wrote a mocking and vindictive Elegy for Judge Boat. Godfrey had no sons: through his elder daughter Lucy, the Boate lands passed by marriage into the Hemsworth family of Abbeville, County Tipperary, although Godfrey seems to have died heavily in debt, and under a private act of Parliament, the Boate's Estate Act 1728 (2 Geo. 2. c. 17 Pr.), much of the Tipperary estate was sold to cover the debts.

== Notable family members ==
- Gerard Boate (1604–1650), writer and physician
- Arnold Boate (1606–1653), Gerard's brother, physician, writer and Hebraist
- Margaret Boate (née Dongan) (1626–1651), Arnold's wife
- Godfrey Boate (1673–1722), Gerard's grandson, Irish High Court judge

== Notable works by members of the Boate family ==
- Philosophia Naturalis Reformata Gerard and Arnold Boate 1641
- A Remonstrance on Diverse Remarkable Passages of Our Army in Ireland Arnold Boate 1642
- Animadversiones sacrae ad textum Hebraicum veteis Testementi Arnold Boate 1644
- Observationes medicae de affectibus a veteribus ommissis Arnold Boate 1649
- The Character of a Truly Virtuous and Pious Woman Arnold Boate 1651
- The Natural History of Ireland Gerard Boate 1652
