= Luffield Priory =

Priory in England, UK

Luffield Priory was a monastic house in Luffield Abbey, straddling the counties of Buckinghamshire and Northamptonshire, England.

The priory was founded by Robert de Beaumont, 1st Earl of Leicester between 1118 and 1135, and dissolved 1494.

Though the vast majority of the priory's land and buildings were in Buckinghamshire, the church itself stood in Northamptonshire; consequently it was the Archdeacon of Northampton who inducted Priors.

== Priors of Luffield ==
- Malgerus
- William - 1151
- Ralph - 1170
- Ralph - 1174
- John
- William
- Roger
- William de Brakele - 1237
- Ralph de Selveston alias Luffield
- Will de Esteneston - 1274
- Adam de Henred - 1279
- John de Houton
- Richard de Silveston (acting Prior for one month)
- Peter de Shaldeston - 1285
- William de Brackeley - 1293
- John de Westbury - 1322
- William de Skelton - 1343
- William de Horwoode - 1350
- John Pyre or Perry - 1381
- John Horwode - 1394
- John Hals - 1419
- John Pinchebeck - 1442
- William Rogers - 1467
- Thomas Rowland - 1489
