= Thomas Fane, 6th Earl of Westmorland =

British peer and member of the House of Lords

The Right Honourable The Earl of Westmorland PC
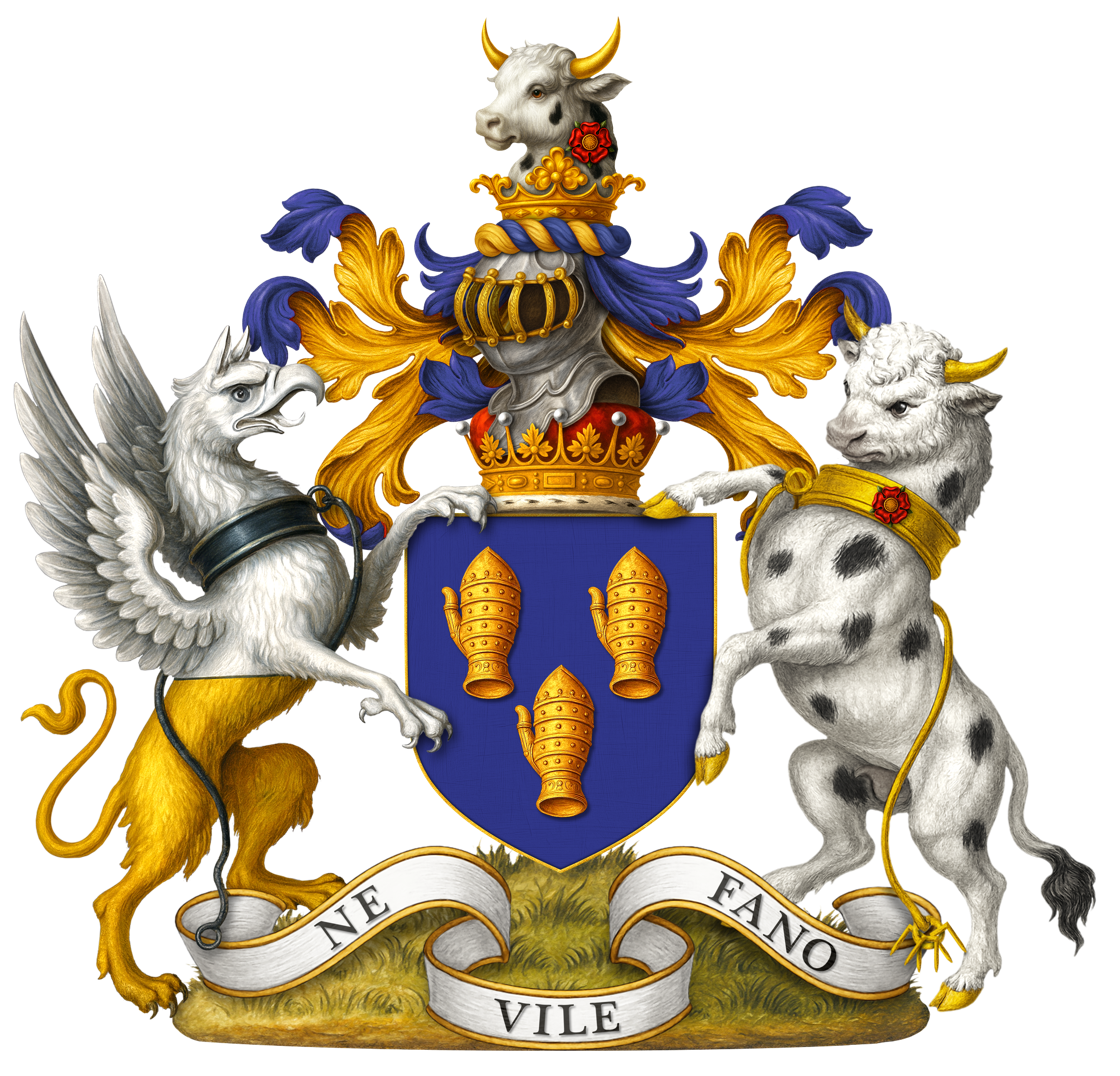

11th First Lord of Trade
- In office 11 May 1719 – May 1735
- Monarchs: George I George II
- Preceded by: The Earl of Holderness
- Succeeded by: The Earl FitzWalter

Custos Rotulorum of Northamptonshire
- In office 1715–1735
- Monarchs: George I George II
- Preceded by: The Earl of Peterborough
- Succeeded by: The Duke of Montagu

Justice in Eyre, north of the Trent
- In office 11 March 1717 – 11 May 1719
- Monarch: George I
- Preceded by: The Marquess of Dorchester
- Succeeded by: The Earl of Harborough

Personal details
- Born: Thomas Fane; 3 October 1681
- Died: 4 June 1736 (aged 54)
- Spouse: Catherine Stringer (1707–1730)
- Parent(s): Vere Fane, 4th Earl of Westmorland; Rachel Bence

Thomas Fane, 6th Earl of Westmorland PC (3 October 1681 – 4 June 1736), styled The Honourable Thomas Fane from 1691 to 1699, was a British peer and member of the House of Lords. He was the third son (second surviving son) of Vere Fane, 4th Earl of Westmorland and his wife Rachel Bence; as well as the younger brother of Vere Fane, and the older brother of John Fane, 7th Earl of Westmorland. As his older brother Vere died without issue in 1699, Thomas Fane inherited the Earldom of Westmorland, as well as his brother's further titles Baron Burghersh and Baron le Despencer.

Fane held many offices, including that of Deputy Warden of the Cinque Ports between 1705 and 1708, First Lord of Trade between 1719 and 1735 and Lord-Lieutenant of Northamptonshire in 1735. Furthermore, he was Gentleman of the Bedchamber to Queen Anne's husband, Prince George of Denmark, on 25 April 1704, and Lord of the Bedchamber to King George I in 1715. In 1717, he was invested as a Privy Counsellor.

Fane married Catherine Stringer, daughter of Thomas Stringer in 1707, and they were married until she died on 4 February 1730. Fane himself died on 4 June 1736 without any issue, and was succeeded as 7th Earl of Westmorland, 7th Baron Burhersh and 10th Lord le Despencer by his younger brother, general John Fane.

== Arms ==
Coat of arms of Thomas Fane, 6th Earl of Westmorland
Crest Out of a ducal coronet Or, a bull's head Argent pied Sable, armed of the first, charged on the neck with a rose Gules barbed and seeded Proper. Escutcheon Azure three dexter gauntlets backs affrontée Or. Supporters Dexter: a griffin per fesse Argent and Or, gorged with a plain collar and lined Sable; Sinister: a bull Argent pied Sable collared and lined Or, at the end of the line a ring and three staples of the last. Motto "NE VILE FANO" (Disgrace not the altar)

== Literature ==
- Debrett, John, ed. (1820). Debrett's Correct Peerage of England, Scotland, and Ireland. Vol. 1 (13 ed.). London: Printed G. Woodall, Angel Court, Skinner Street.
- Mosley, Charles, ed. (2003). Burke's Peerage, Baronetage & Knightage. Vol. 3 (107th ed.). Wilmington, Delaware: Burke's Peerage (Genealogical Books) Ltd.
- Naylor, George, ed. (1888). The registers of the parish of Thorington in the county of Suffolk: with notes of the different acts of Parliament referring to them, and notices of the Bence family, with pedigree, and other families whose names appear therein. London: Mitchell and Hughes.

Political offices
Preceded by The Earl of Holderness	First Lord of Trade; 1719–1735	Succeeded by The Earl FitzWalter
Honorary titles
Preceded by The Earl of Peterborough	Custos Rotulorum of Northamptonshire; 1715–1735	Succeeded by The Duke of Montagu
Preceded by The Duke of Kingston-upon-Hull	Justice in Eyre north of the Trent; 1717–1719	Succeeded by The Earl of Harborough
Peerage of England
Preceded by Vere Fane	Earl of Westmorland; 1699–1736	Succeeded by John Fane
