= William Twysden =

William Twysden may refer to:

- Sir William Twysden, 1st Baronet (1566–1628), MP
- Sir William Twysden, 3rd Baronet (1635–1697), MP
