= Lamport, Buckinghamshire =

Hamlet in Buckinghamshire, England

Coordinates: 52.029°N 0.997°W

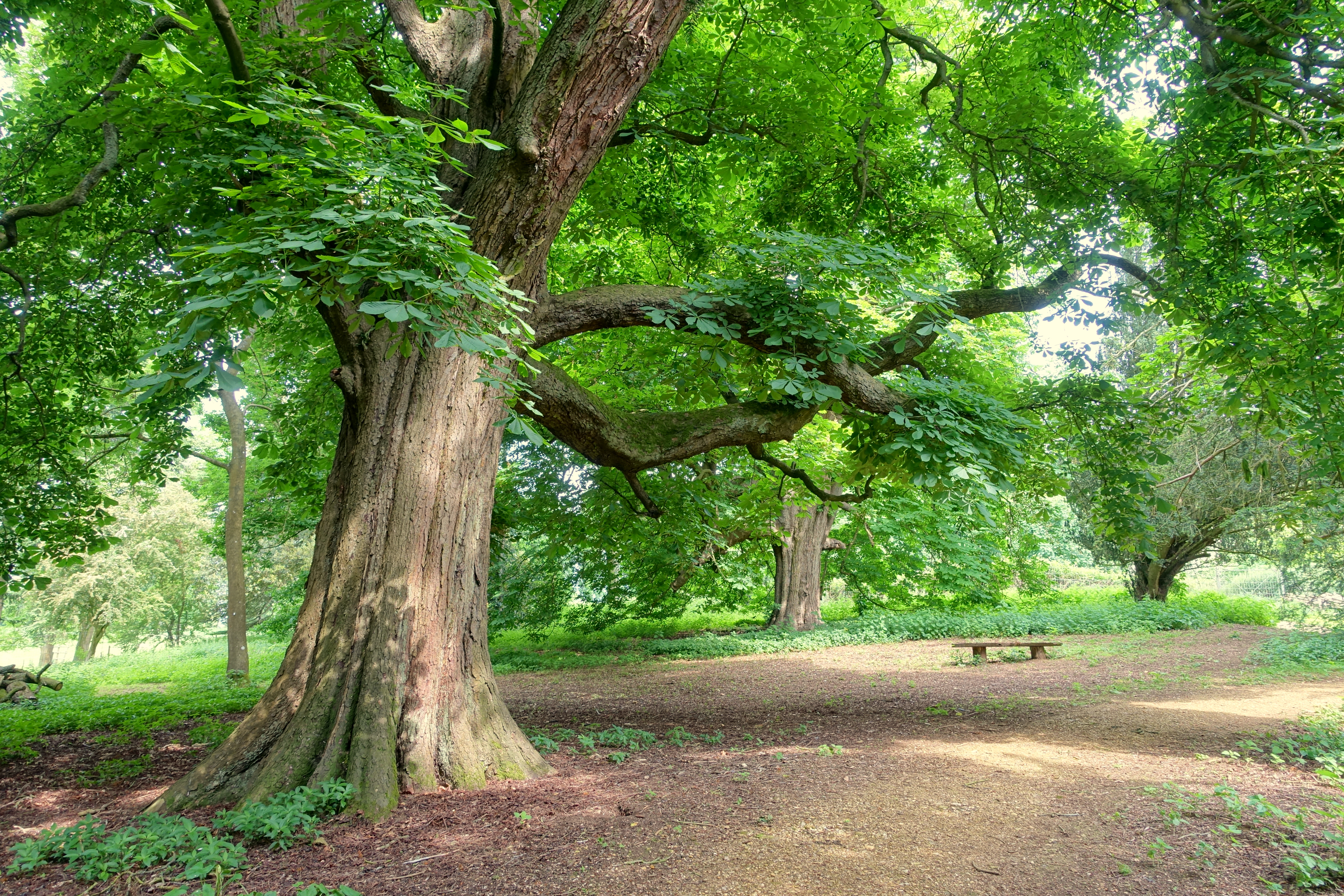
Lamport Garden, 2016

Lamport (occasionally also Langport) was a hamlet in the parish of Stowe in north Buckinghamshire, England. It was cleared by the Temple family, as a result of enclosures, after 1739, to improve the amenity value of their new park at Stowe. The hamlet's name is Old English, meaning long town.

== History ==
Lamport consisted of two ancient manors, one of which was owned by the priory of Oseney and passed to Stowe; the other seems to have belonged to Luffield Abbey, whose estate had passed, by 1350, to a family named after the hamlet, and subsequently passed by marriage, in 1416, to the Dayrells (whose name continues in the village name of Lillingstone Dayrell). It was annexed to Stowe to provide homes for the staff and servants of the new manor house there.

In 1637, Peter Temple enclosed land around Lamport for his deer park. This aggrieved the Dayrells, who owned some of the enclosed land. A dispute, occasionally violent, ensued and eventually led to litigation in 1640 and a petition to Parliament. Notwithstanding the Dayrells' resistance, the village's continued to be enclosed and it was abandoned sometime after 1739.
