= Custos Rotulorum of Northamptonshire =

This is a list of people who have served as Custos Rotulorum of Northamptonshire.

- Sir Edward Montagu bef. 1544–1557
- William Cecil, 1st Baron Burghley bef. 1564 – aft. 1584
- Thomas Cecil, 1st Earl of Exeter bef. 1594–1623
- Francis Manners, 6th Earl of Rutland 1623–1625
- Francis Fane, 1st Earl of Westmorland 1625–1629
- William Spencer, 2nd Baron Spencer 1629–1636
- Sir Christopher Hatton 1636–1646
- Interregnum
- Edward Montagu, 2nd Earl of Manchester 1660–1671
- James Compton, 3rd Earl of Northampton 1671–1681
- Christopher Hatton, 1st Viscount Hatton 1681–1689
- Charles Mordaunt, 1st Earl of Monmouth 1689
- Christopher Hatton, 1st Viscount Hatton 1689–1706
- vacant
- George Brudenell, 3rd Earl of Cardigan 1711–1714
- Charles Mordaunt, 3rd Earl of Peterborough 1714–1715
- Thomas Fane, 6th Earl of Westmorland 1715–1735
- John Montagu, 2nd Duke of Montagu 1735–1749

For later custodes rotulorum, see Lord Lieutenant of Northamptonshire.
