= Charles Fane, 3rd Earl of Westmorland =

British peer and Member of Parliament

The Right Honourable The Earl of Westmorland
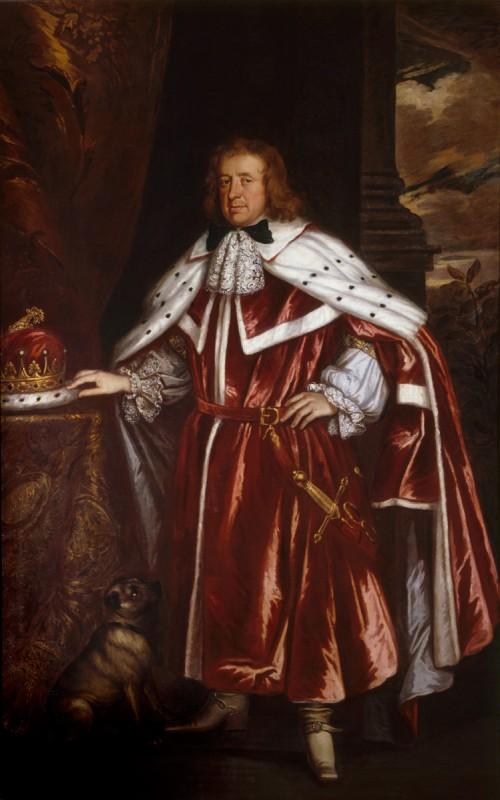
- Portrait, c. 1690

Member of Parliament for Peterborough
- In office 26 May 1660 – 29 December 1660 Serving with Sir Humphrey Orme
- Monarch: Charles II
- Preceded by: None (3rd Long Parliament dissolved)
- Succeeded by: Himself (in the Cavalier Parliament
- In office 1661 – 12 February 1666 Serving with Sir Humphrey Orme
- Monarch: Charles II
- Preceded by: Himself (in the Convention Parliament
- Succeeded by: Edward Palmer

Personal details
- Born: Charles Fane; 6 January 1635
- Died: 18 September 1691 (aged 56)
- Resting place: Apethorpe Hall, Apethorpe, Northamptonshire, England; 52.5472°N 0.4922°E
- Spouse(s): Elizabeth Nodes (1665); Dorothy Brudenell (before 1691)
- Parent(s): Mildmay Fane, 2nd Earl of Westmorland; Grace Thornhurst
- Relatives: Vere Fane, 4th Earl of Westmorland (brother)

Charles Fane, 3rd Earl of Westmorland (6 January 1635 – 18 September 1691), styled Lord le Despenser between 1626 and 1666, of Apethorpe Hall, Northamptonshire was an English peer and twice Member of Parliament for Peterborough.

== Life ==
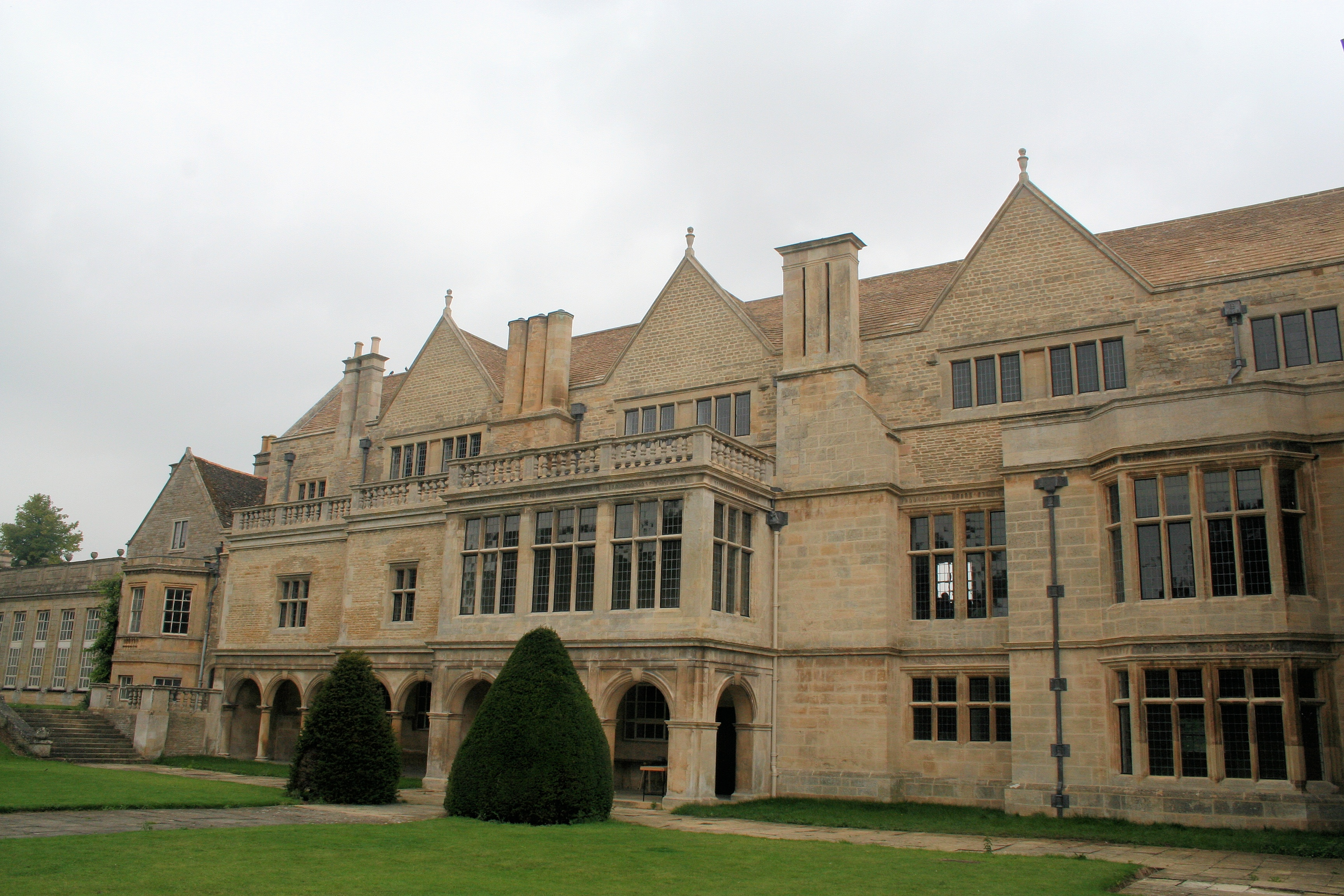
Apethorpe Hall, Northamptonshire, the Fane family seat

Fane was the eldest son of Mildmay Fane, 2nd Earl of Westmorland and his first wife Grace Thornhurst, daughter of Sir William Thornhurst of Agnes Court, Kent. He was a student at Emmanuel College, Cambridge in 1649, and travelled abroad from 1652 to 1654 to France and the Netherlands. In 1660 he was elected Member of Parliament for Peterborough in the Convention Parliament. He appears to have been rather inactive in his period as Member of Parliament, having been a member of a total of five committees concerned with, amongst others, the drainage of the fens. He was re-elected MP for Peterborough in 1661 for the Cavalier Parliament, but was again inactive.

When his father died on 12 February 1666, Charles Fane inherited the earldom of Westmorland, as well as his father's further titles Baron Burghersh and Baron le Despencer. Due to his status as peer, he had to give up his seat in the House of Commons of England and instead entered the House of Lords. Though apparently an opponent of James II in 1684, he refused to take up arms against the King the year after. He died at the age of 56 and was buried at Apethorpe Hall.

== Family ==
Fane married twice: first, to Elizabeth Nodes, daughter of Charles Nodes of Shephalbury, Hertfordshire on 15 June 1665. When she died, he remarried, this time to Lady Dorothy Brudenell, daughter to Robert Brudenell, 2nd Earl of Cardigan and his wife Lady Frances Savile. As he had no children by either wife, he was succeeded by his younger half-brother, Vere Fane, 4th Earl of Westmorland.

== Arms ==
Coat of arms of Charles Fane, 3rd Earl of Westmorland
Crest Out of a ducal coronet Or, a bull's head Argent pied Sable, armed of the first, charged on the neck with a rose Gules barbed and seeded Proper. Escutcheon Azure three dexter gauntlets backs affrontée Or. Supporters Dexter: a griffin per fesse Argent and Or, gorged with a plain collar and lined Sable; Sinister: a bull Argent pied Sable collared and lined Or, at the end of the line a ring and three staples of the last. Motto "NE VILE FANO" (Disgrace not the altar)

== Literature ==
- Debrett, John, ed. (1820). Debrett's Correct Peerage of England, Scotland, and Ireland. Vol. 1 (13th ed.). London: Printed G. Woodall, Angel Court, Skinner Street.
- Henning, Basil Duke, ed. (2006). The History of Parliament: the House of Commons, 1660-1690 (Hardcover). London: Secker & Warburg. ISBN 978-0436192746.
- Helms, M. W.; Edwards, E. R. (2002). "FANE, Charles, Lord le Despenser (1635-91), of Apethorpe, Northants". The History of Parliament.
- Mosley, Charles, ed. (1999). Burke's Peerage and Baronetage. Vol. 1 (106th ed.). Crans, Switzerland: Burke's Peerage (Genealogical Books) Ltd.
- Mosley, Charles, ed. (2003). Burke's Peerage, Baronetage & Knightage. Vol. 3 (107th ed.). Wilmington, Delaware: Burke's Peerage (Genealogical Books) Ltd.

Peerage of England
Preceded by Mildmay Fane	Earl of Westmorland; 1666–1691	Succeeded by Vere Fane
