= All Saints' Church, Hillesden =

Coordinates: 51°57′11.19″N 1°0′11.54″W

All Saints’ Church, Hillesden
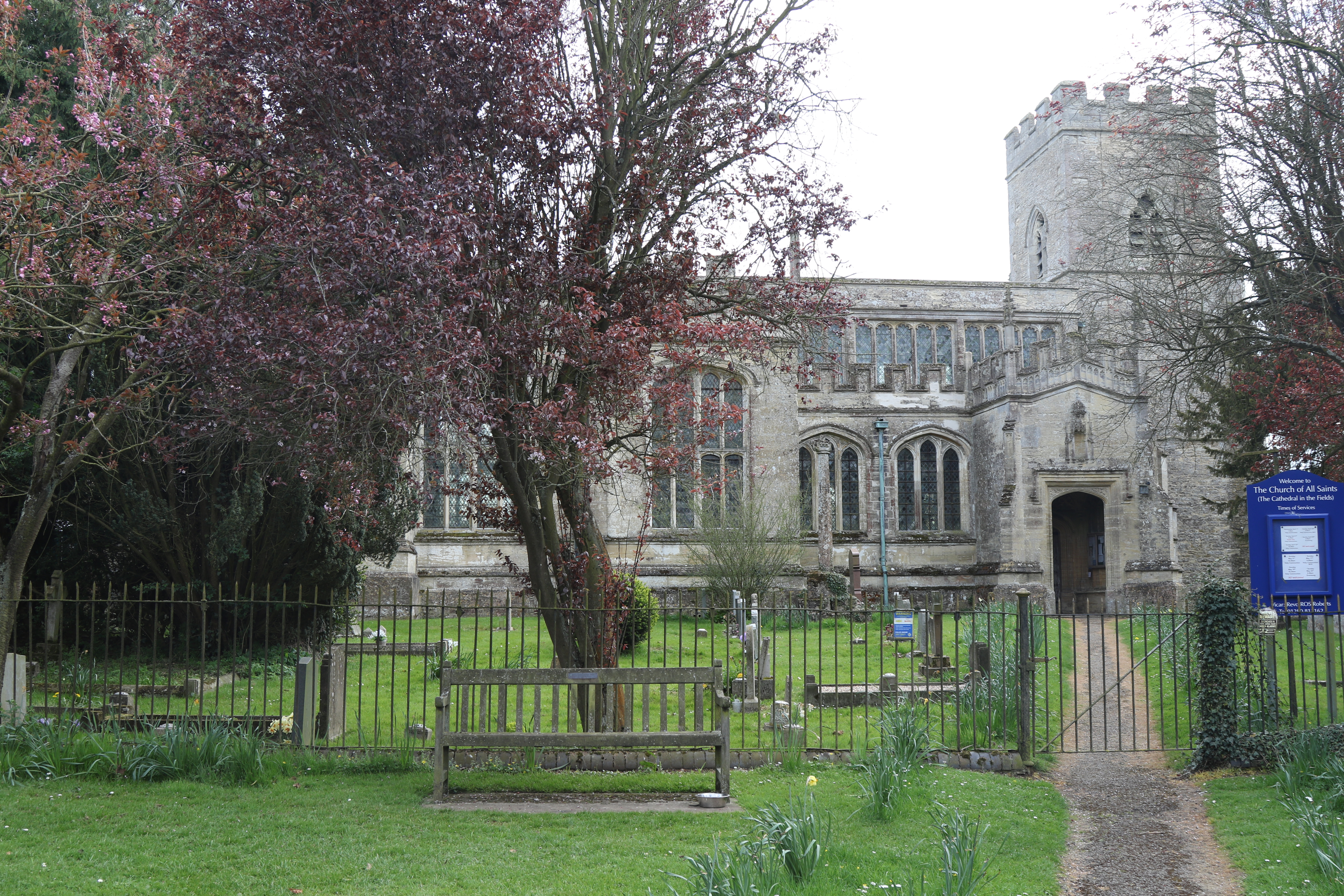
- All Saints’ Church, Hillesden
- All Saints’ Church, Hillesden
- OS grid reference: SP 68569 28753
- Location: Hillesden
- Country: England
- Denomination: Church of England

History
- Dedication: All Saints

Architecture
- Heritage designation: Grade I listed

Administration
- Diocese: Diocese of Oxford
- Archdeaconry: Buckingham
- Deanery: Buckingham
- Parish: Hillesden

All Saints’ Church, Hillesden is a Grade I listed parish church in the Church of England in Hillesden, Buckinghamshire.

== History ==
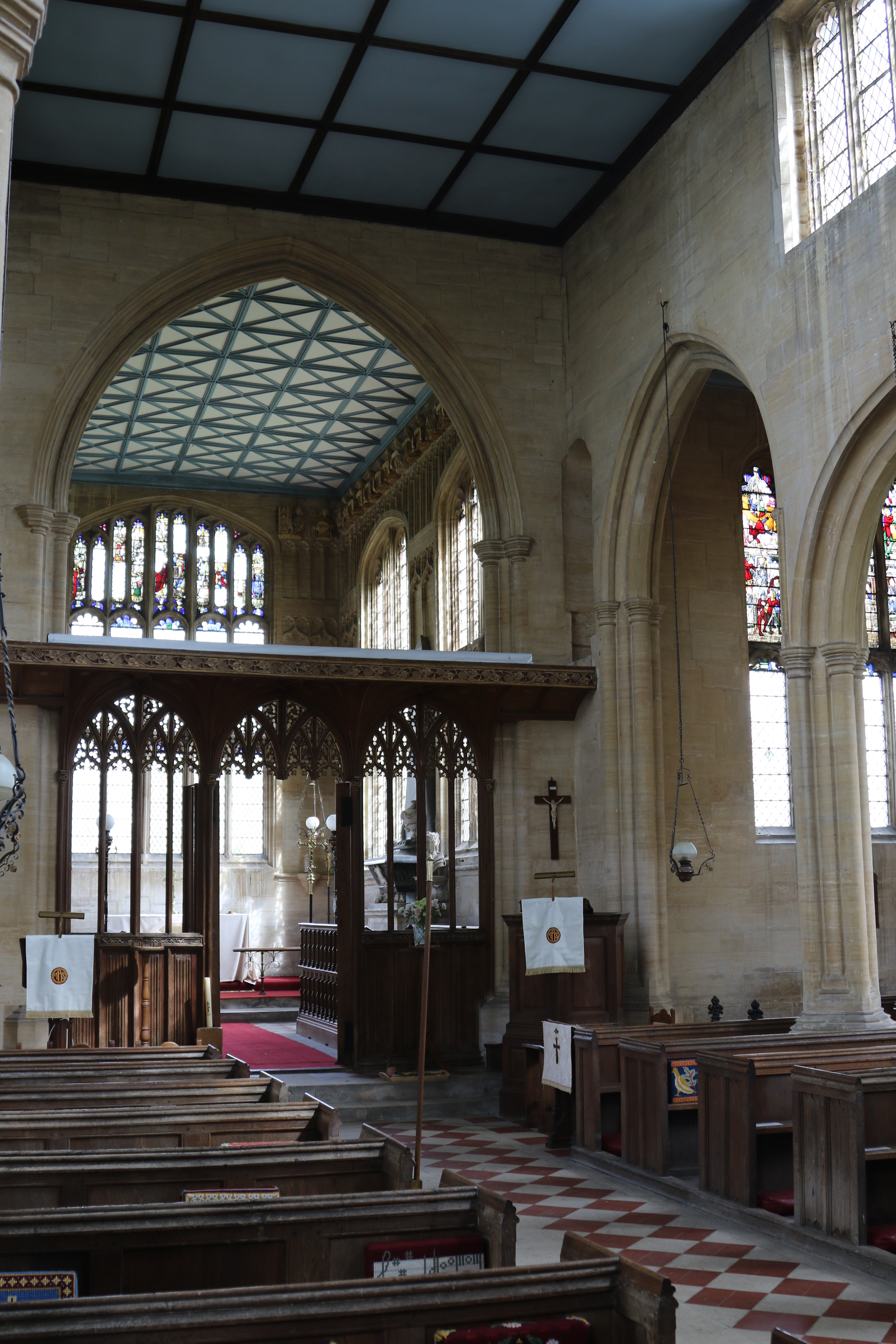
The nave, chancel and south transept

The church tower dates from the 15th century. The rest was rebuilt by the monks of Notley Abbey starting in 1493. It is built on a cruciform plan with aisles, north porch, chapel to north side of the chancel and an octagonal staircase on the outside of the north side which gives access to a vestry and above it a private chapel.

The south porch door was formerly in Hillesden House. It retains the bullet holes from the English Civil War when the village was attacked by Parliamentary Forces.

It was restored between 1874 and 1875 by George Gilbert Scott. He had been born in the nearby village of Gawcott and this building was one of the inspirations for his interest in Gothic architecture. He restored it for free. It was reopened on 16 June 1875. The roofs were replaced and a ceiling inserted with oak panels and mouldings. The old seats were restored and new ones made to match. The pulpit was remodelled. The screen was restored and installed to separate the chantry from the transepts. The Denton tomb in the chancel was repaired. The stained glass windows were relaid by Burlison and Grylls and a new window inserted which depicts the story of the parables.

It was restored again in the 1960s.

== Incumbents ==
The names of the Minister or Curates from the time of the rebuilding of All Saints in 1493 are not all recorded for the church was appropriated in 1162 to Notley Abbey being served by a Monk or Canon of Notley up to the earliest recorded Curate in 1526.

- 1526 John Orchard (Canonicus Notley, Curatus de Hillesden)
- 1555 Thomas Bridges (Curatus de Hillesden)
- 1561 Walter moor
- 1580 Thomas Courte
- 1604 Thomas Evans
- 1612 Edmund Taylor
- 1617 Robert Marsh
- 1622 John Aris
- 1628 William Oakley (taken prisoner when the manor house surrendered to Parliamentary forces in 1644)
- 1645 Interregnum
- 1660 Christopher Canner
- 1666 Samuel Dix
- 1670 Richard Banks AM
- 1675 John Ford AM
- 1684 Hugh Priket
- 1685 Humphry Drake AM
- 1692 Stephen Townsend AM
- 1724 Robert Pearse AM (also Rector of Scotter in Lincolnshire)
- 1741 Henry Quartley AM (also Rector of Wicken in Northamptonshire)
- 1795 George Mettam AM (also Rector of Barwell in Leicestershire)
- 1816 William Eyre AM (also Vicar of Padbury)
- 1830 William Thomas Eyre AM (also Vicar of Padbury)

All Saints was administered by the Diocese of Lincoln from records commencing 1902 to 1837, and thereafter by the Diocese of Oxford. After the Dissolution of the Monasteries, Hillesden was first granted to the Dean and Chapter of Christ Church, Oxford in 1542, and subsequently to the new foundation created by King Henry VIII in 1546. The Vicarage at Hillesden was rebuilt in 1869 and thereafter the ministers of All Saints were styled Vicars.

- 1860 Robert Holt
- 1904 Cecil H Hopper
- 1910 James L Bowley MA
- 1939 Eric Edwards
- 1943 John G Campbell
- 1957 Patrick Moore
- 1960 Interregnum
- 1962 Aubrey F.T. Newell BA
- 1987 John Hudson CSS FRSA
- 2002 Jenny J. Shields Cert Ed. Assoc. Priest
- 2004 Tom Gibbons BA
- 2008 Rosamunde M. Roberts SRN, SCM, DipTh & Min.

== Parish status ==
The church is in a joint parish with:

- St Cecilia's Church, Adstock
- Holy Trinity Church, Gawcott
- St Mary the Virgin's Church, Padbury

== Stained glass ==
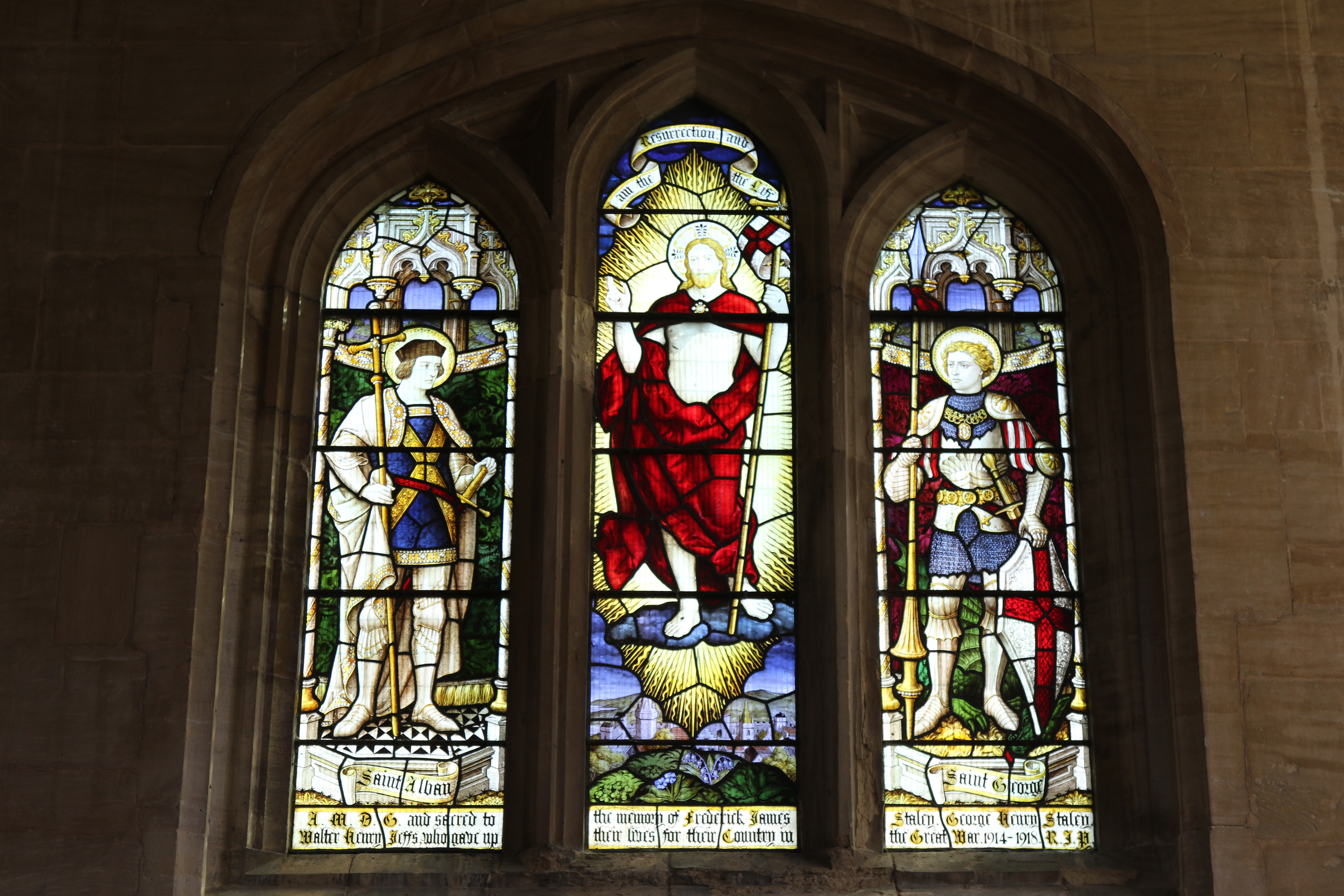
Memorial to Frederick James Staley, George Henry Staley, Walter Henry Jeffs, who died in the First World War

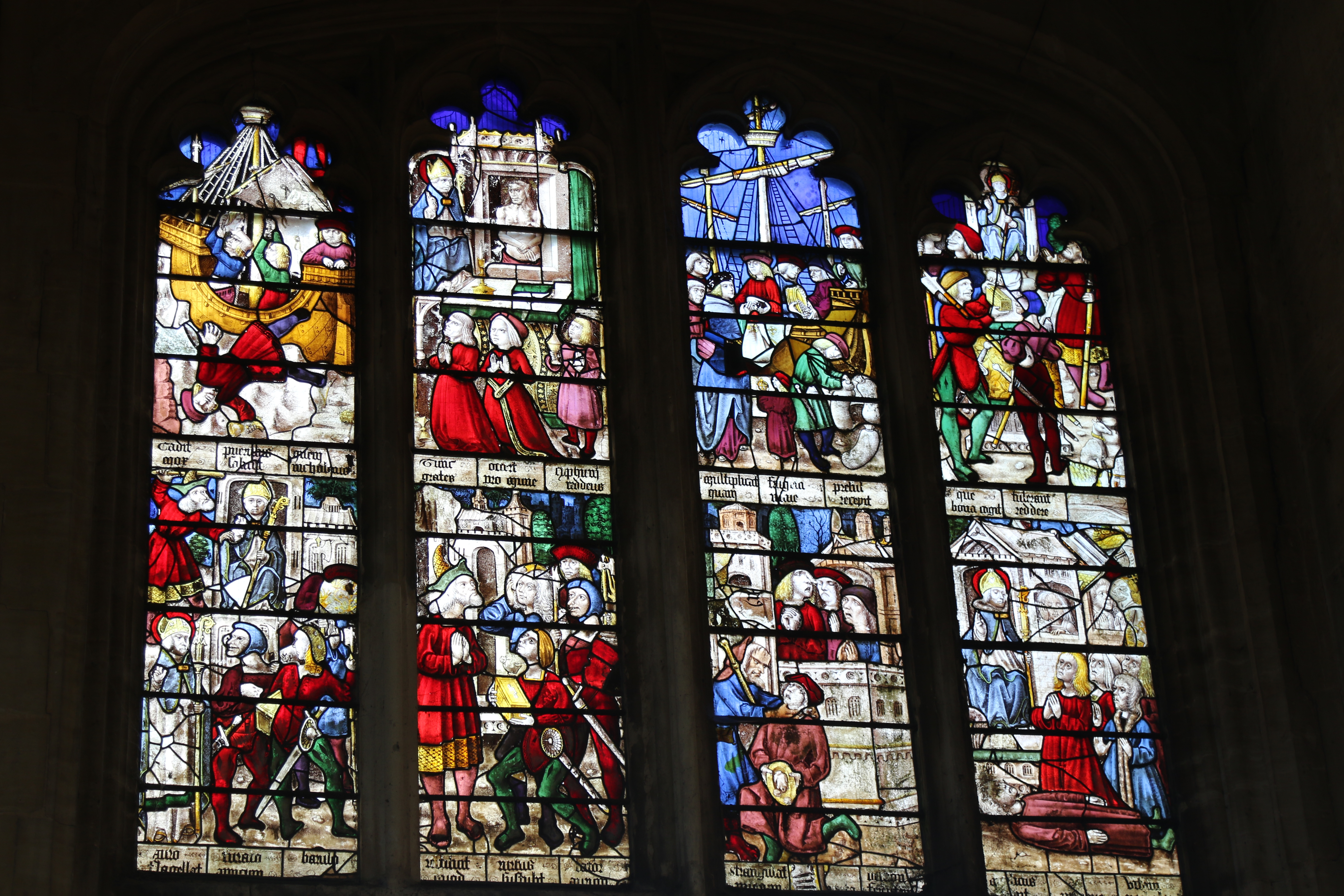
The miracles of St Nicholas. Sixteenth century Flemish glass

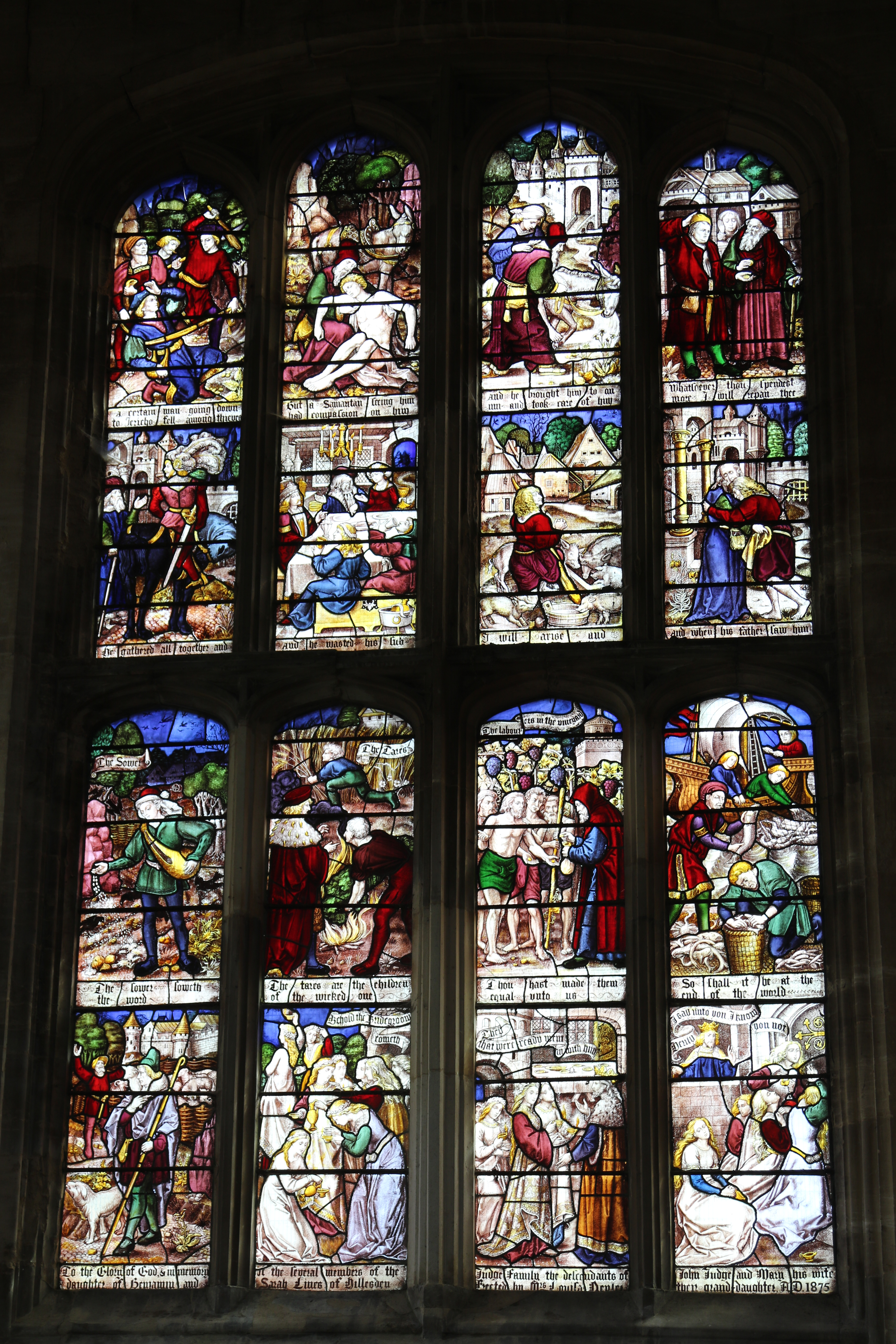
The parables by Burlison and Grylls 1875

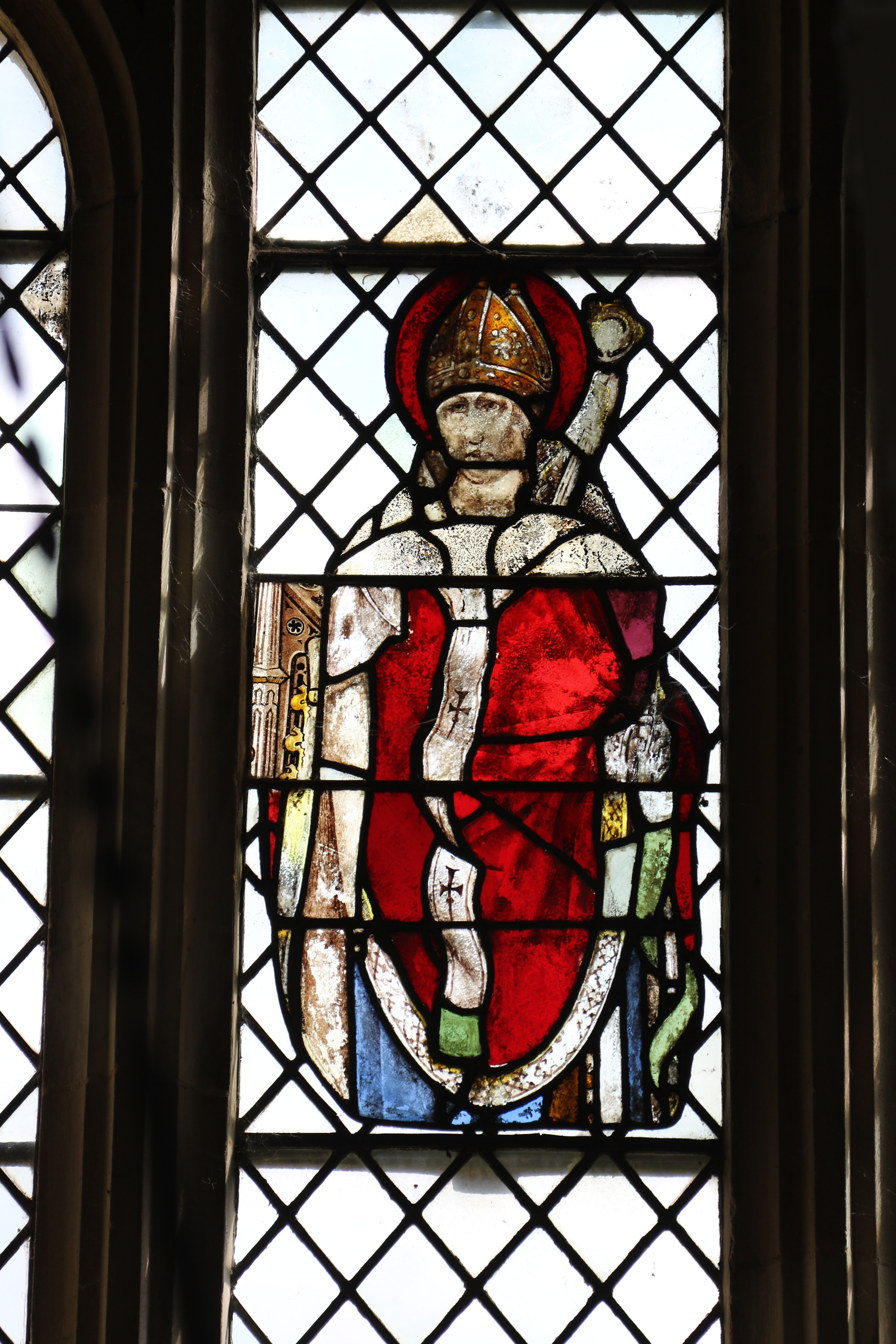
A bishop

== Memorials ==
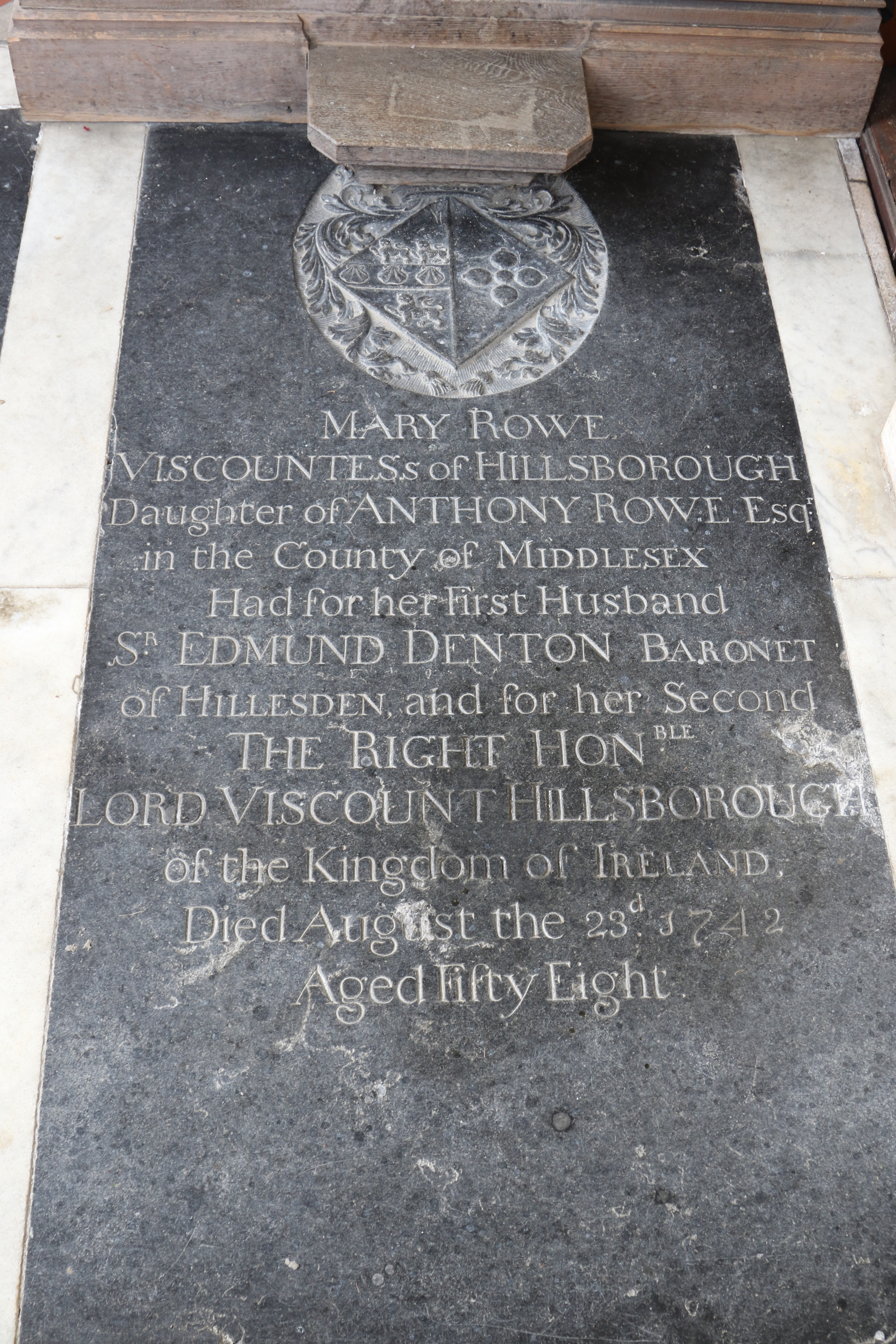
Mary Rowe, Viscountess of Hillsborough

- Catharine Denton (d.1733)
- Dr William Denton (d. 1691)
- George Woodward (d. 1735)
- Alexander Denton (d. 1576)
- Elizabeth Denton (d. 1667)
- Thomas Isham (d. 1676)
- Godfrey Boate (d. 1722)
- Mary Rowe, Viscountess of Hillsborough (d. 1742)

== Organ ==
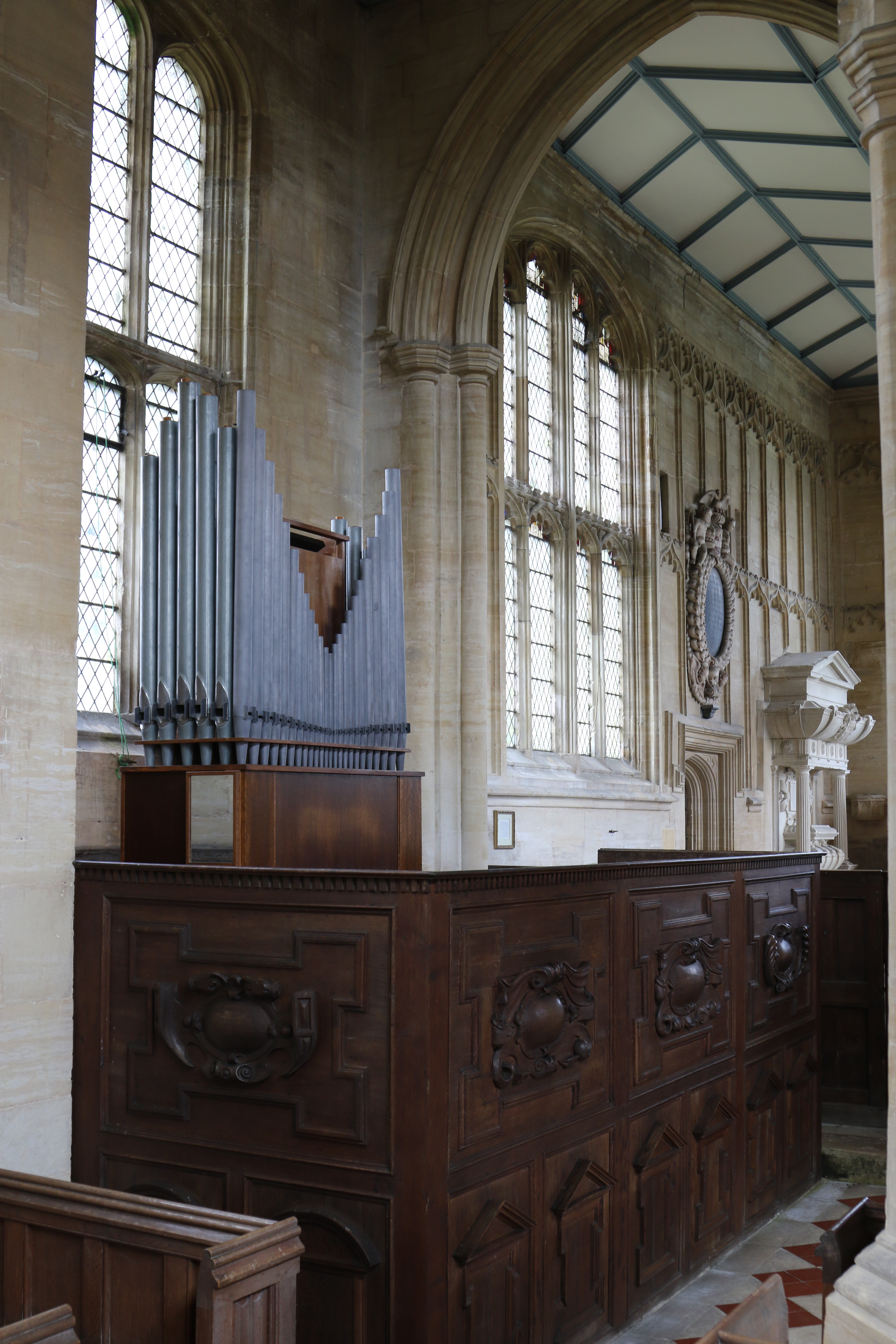
The organ

The pipe organ dates from 1970 and was built by George Osmund. A specification of the organ can be found on the National Pipe Organ Register.
