= William Lancaster (Queen's) =

English churchman and academic

William Lancaster D.D. (1650–1717) was an English churchman and academic, Provost of The Queen's College, Oxford.

== Life ==
He was son of William Lancaster of Sockbridge in Barton parish, Westmoreland, born there in 1650. He kept for some time the parish school of Barton, and at his death he added an increase to the master's salary. The school is near Lowther Castle, and when Sir John Lowther's son John, afterwards John Lowther, 1st Viscount Lonsdale, went to Queen's College, Oxford, he was attended by Lancaster, who entered as batler on 23 June 1670, and matriculated on 1 July aged 20. He graduated with a B.A. on 6 February 1675 and M.A. on 1 July 1678 (after his degree had been stopped for some words against John Clerke, of All Souls College, the proctor, but was carried in congregation), B.D. 12 April 1690, and D.D. 8 July 1692. On 20 December 1674, he was elected tabarder of his college, and on 15 March 1679 was both elected and admitted fellow.

About 1676, he was sent to Paris with a state grant on the recommendation of Sir Joseph Williamson (who believed in training promising university young men for public life), and later resumed his career at Oxford. He acted when junior fellow as chaplain to William Feilding, 3rd Earl of Denbigh, and was collated on 1 September 1682 to the vicarage of Oakley, Buckinghamshire, which he held until 1690. In college, he became celebrated as tutor. From the beginning of 1686 till 1 August he was junior bursar, for the next four years he held the post of senior bursar, and he retained his fellowship until his marriage, very early in 1696. Lancaster became domestic chaplain to Henry Compton, bishop of London, on whose nomination he was instituted (22 July 1692) to the vicarage of St. Martin's-in-the-Fields, London. The presentation, however, was claimed by Queen Anne, and judgment was given in her favour in a legal case; she presented Dr. Nicholas Gouge. Lancaster was a popular preacher, and John Evelyn records a visit to hear him on 20 November 1692. At Gouge's death he was again instituted (31 October 1694).

On 15 October 1704, Lancaster was elected Provost of Queen's College, but the election was disputed as against the statutes; the question, which was whether the right of election extended to past as well as present fellows, being argued in an anonymous pamphlet entitled 'A True State of the Case concerning the Election of a Provost of Queen's College, Oxford, 1704,' written by Francis Thompson, senior fellow at the time. An appeal was made to the Archbishop of York, as Visitor, but the election was confirmed, on a hearing of the case by Dr. Thomas Bouchier the commissary. Through Compton's favour Lancaster held the archdeaconry of Middlesex from 1705 until his death, and for four years (1706–10) he was Vice-Chancellor of Oxford University. In university matters, he showed himself a Whig, if in religion he favoured the views of the high church party and was one of the bail for Henry Sacheverell. His enemies accused him of trimming and of intriguing for a bishopric. The see of St. Davids was offered to him, but he declined it.

Through his diplomacy with the corporation of Oxford, a plot of land in the High Street was leased to the college for a thousand years without charge and the first stone of a new court was laid by him on Queen Anne's birthday (6 February 1710). His arms are conspicuous in many places in the college. He died at Oxford, 4 February 1717 and was buried in the old church of St Martin's-in-the-Fields. His wife, a kinswoman of Bishop Compton, was a daughter of Mr Wilmer of Sywell in Northamptonshire.

== Works ==
Lancaster was author of:

- A Latin speech on the presentation of William Jane as prolocutor of the lower house of convocation, 1689.
- A sermon before the House of Commons, 30 January 1697.
- A recommendatory preface to the 'Door of the Tabernacle,' 1703. Many of his letters are in the Ballard collection at the Bodleian Library.

== Reputation ==
Lancaster is said to have been the original of 'Slyboots' in the letter from 'Abraham Froth,' a satire on Arthur Charlett printed in The Spectator, No. 43, and by Thomas Hearne he is frequently called 'Smoothboots,' 'Northern bear,' and 'old hypocritical, ambitious, drunken sot.'

== Sources ==
- This article incorporates text from a publication now in the public domain: "Lancaster, William". Dictionary of National Biography. London: Smith, Elder & Co. 1885–1900.

Academic offices
Preceded by Timothy Halton	Provost of The Queen's College, Oxford; 1704–1716/7	Succeeded by John Gibson
Preceded by William Delaune	Vice-Chancellor of Oxford University; 1706–1710	Succeeded by Thomas Brathwait
