= Vere Fane, 5th Earl of Westmorland =

English peer and member of the House of Lords

The Earl of Westmorland
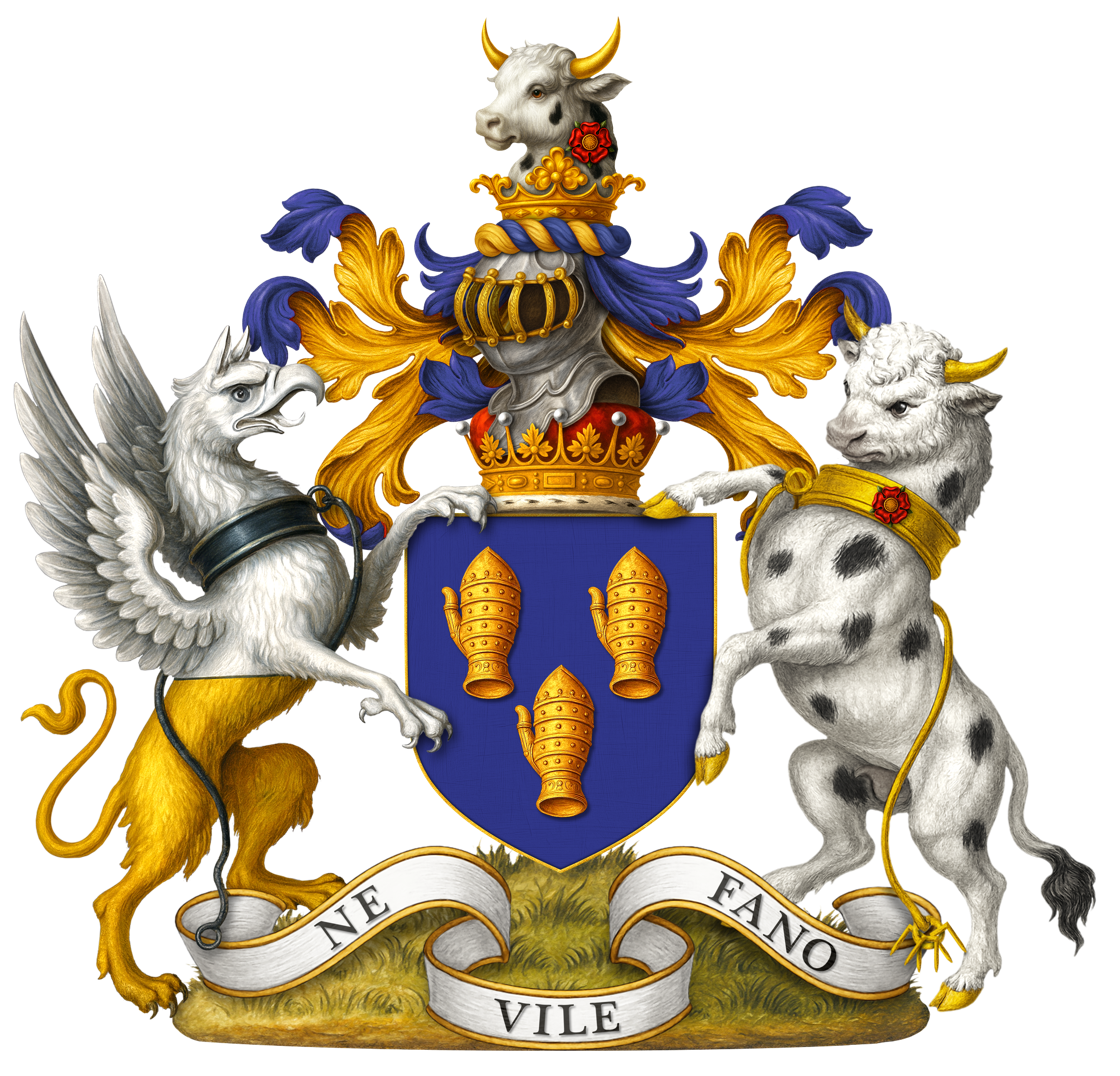
- Tenure: 1693–1698
- Predecessor: Vere Fane, 4th Earl of Westmorland
- Successor: Thomas Fane, 6th Earl of Westmorland
- Other titles: 8th Lord le Despenser; 5th Baron Burhersh
- Born: Vere Fane; 25 May 1678
- Died: 19 May 1698 (aged 19)
- Parents: Vere Fane, 4th Earl of Westmorland; Rachel Bence

Vere Fane, 5th Earl of Westmorland (25 May 1678 – 19 May 1698), styled The Honourable Vere Fane between 1678 and 1691 and Lord le Despenser between 1691 and 1693, was an English peer and member of the House of Lords. He was the second son (but oldest surviving son) of Vere Fane, 4th Earl of Westmorland and his wife Rachel Bence; as well as the older brother of Thomas Fane and John Fane. When his father died in 1693, Vere Fane inherited the Earldom of Westmorland, as well as his father's further titles Baron Burghersh and Lord le Despenser. Fane died in 1698 at the age of 19, unmarried and without any issue, and was succeeded by his younger brother Thomas.

== Arms ==
Coat of arms of Vere Fane, 5th Earl of Westmorland
Crest Out of a ducal coronet Or, a bull's head Argent pied Sable, armed of the first, charged on the neck with a rose Gules barbed and seeded Proper. Escutcheon Azure three dexter gauntlets backs affrontée Or. Supporters Dexter: a griffin per fesse Argent and Or, gorged with a plain collar and lined Sable; Sinister: a bull Argent pied Sable collared and lined Or, at the end of the line a ring and three staples of the last. Motto "NE VILE FANO" (Disgrace not the altar)

== Literature ==
- Debrett, John, ed. (1820). Debrett's Correct Peerage of England, Scotland, and Ireland. Vol. 1 (13 ed.). London: Printed G. Woodall, Angel Court, Skinner Street.
- Mosley, Charles, ed. (2003). Burke's Peerage, Baronetage & Knightage. Vol. 3 (107th ed.). Wilmington, Delaware: Burke's Peerage (Genealogical Books) Ltd.
- Naylor, George, ed. (1888). The registers of the parish of Thorington in the county of Suffolk: with notes of the different acts of Parliament referring to them, and notices of the Bence family, with pedigree, and other families whose names appear therein. London: Mitchell and Hughes.

Peerage of England
Preceded by Vere Fane	Earl of Westmorland; 1693–1698	Succeeded by Thomas Fane
