= Godfrey Boate =

Irish judge

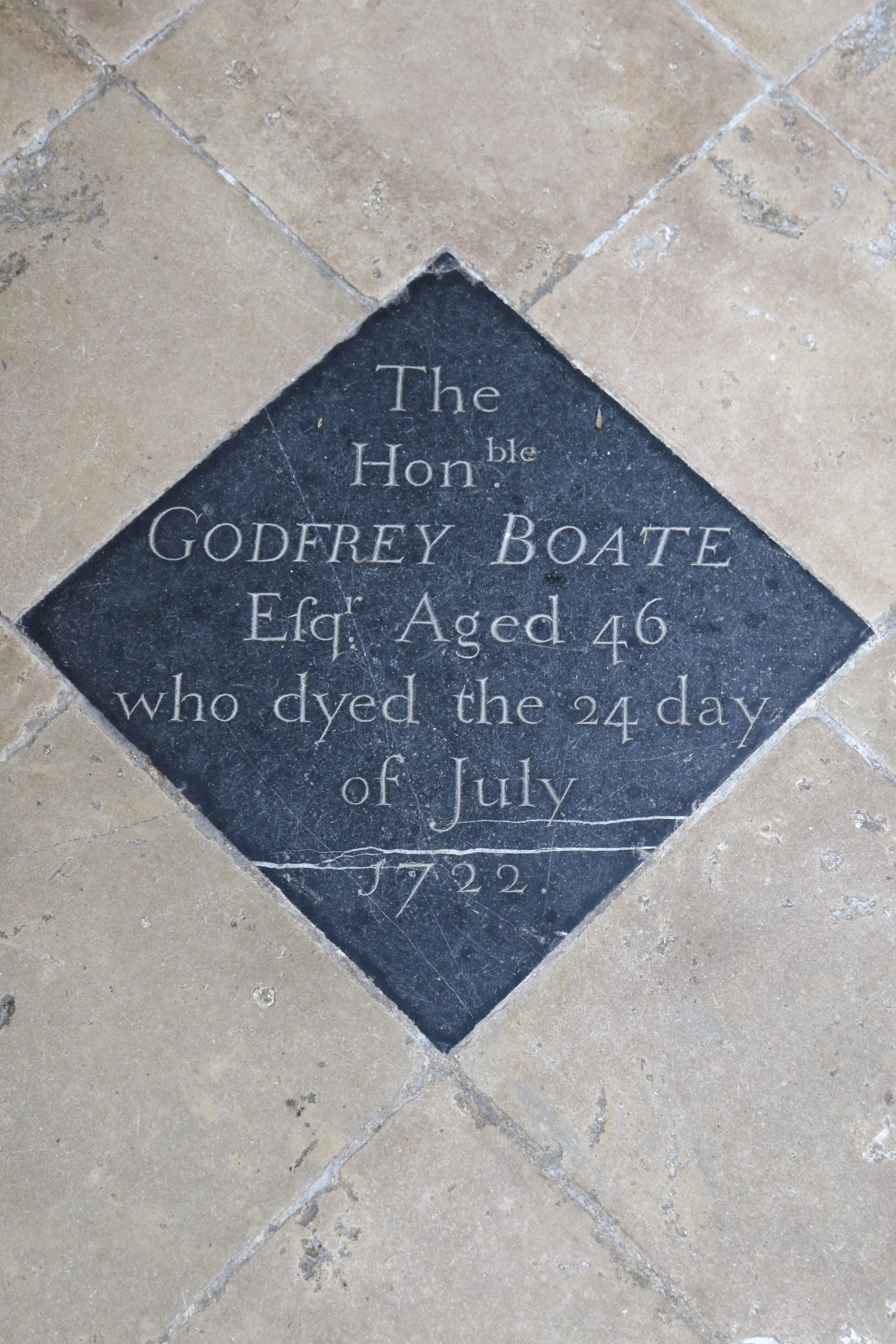
Memorial to Godfrey Boate in All Saints' Church, Hillesden, Buckinghamshire

Godfrey Boate (1673/1676 - 1722) was an Irish judge: he is mainly remembered now for incurring the enmity of Jonathan Swift, who celebrated Boate's death with the mocking Quibbling Elegy on Judge Boat.

== Biography ==
He was born in County Tipperary, the eldest son of Godfrey Boate senior. There is some doubt about his year of birth: his memorial, which gives his age as 46, suggests that it was 1676, but it is usually given as 1673.

His father was a clerk in the Court of Chancery (Ireland), but this position may have been a sinecure, since the Boate family were substantial landowners in Tipperary. These lands had been granted to Catharina (or Katherine) Menning (or Manning), widow of Gerard Boate (1604-1650), author of The Natural History of Ireland; Gerard and Katherine were Godfrey's grandparents. The Boate family, originally called de Boot, came to Ireland from Gorinchem in the Netherlands in the 1640s. Godfrey himself does not seem to have been a wealthy man, and died heavily in debt.

== Career ==
Godfrey went to school in Dublin and attended Trinity College Dublin where he matriculated in 1692. He entered Gray's Inn the same year and was called to the Irish Bar. He seems to have had no interest in politics, and was the only Irish judge of his generation never to have sat in the Irish House of Commons. After a brief period as Master in Chancery, he became Prime Serjeant in 1716. The following year he became third justice of the Court of King's Bench (Ireland); Francis Elrington Ball, in his definitive study of the pre-independence Irish judiciary, thought that Boate was unqualified to be a judge, an opinion with which Jonathan Swift, who knew and loathed Boate, would most certainly have agreed. Sir Richard Levinge, 1st Baronet, Chief Justice of the Irish Common Pleas, also had a very poor opinion of Boate, as he did of almost all of his colleagues on the Bench.

== Death and family ==
Boate died of dropsy in the summer of 1722, apparently while visiting his wife's relatives in England. He was buried in All Saints' Church, Hillesden, Buckinghamshire, where his memorial still exists. He married Cary Denton, eldest daughter of Alexander Denton of Hillesden, Buckinghamshire and Hester Herman, and sister of Sir Edmund Denton and the judge Alexander Denton. She died in 1739, and is buried beside her husband They had at least two daughters:

Boate's Estate Act 1728
- Act of Parliament
- Parliament of Great Britain
- Long title: An Act for vesting all the Lands and Hereditaments in the County of Tipperary, in the Kingdom of Ireland, late the Estate of Godfrey Boate Esquire, late One of the Justices of His Majesty's Court of King's Bench in that Kingdom, deceased, in Trustees, to be sold, for the Payment of the Debts of the said Godfrey Boate; and for other Purposes.
- Citation: 2 Geo. 2. c. 17 Pr.
- Territorial extent: Great Britain

Dates
- Royal assent: 14 May 1729
- Commencement: 21 January 1729 (Note: Start of session.)

Status: Current legislation

- Lucy, who married the Rev. Thomas Hemsworth of Abbeville, vicar of Birr. They inherited the Boate estates in Tipperary; however it appears that the lands were heavily encumbered by her father's debts. In 1728 a private act of Parliament, Boate's Estate Act 1728 (2 Geo. 2. c. 17 Pr.), was passed vesting the Tipperary lands in trustees to be sold "for the payment of the late Judge Boate's debts".
- Mary, who married Godfrey Clayton (who died in 1745, when still only in his early 20s); she died in 1772 and is buried beside her husband, father and mother in All Saints' Church, Hillesden.

== Waters' case ==
In 1720 the Crown moved against Edward Waters, the printer of Swift's Proposal for the Universal Use of Irish Manufacture. He was tried for seditious libel before a Court presided over by Boate and William Whitshed, the Lord Chief Justice of Ireland. Boate appears to have played a very minor role at the trial, as Whitshed, the senior judge, dominated the proceedings. Whitsed's conduct of the trial was much criticised: on no less than nine occasions he refused to accept a verdict of not guilty, claiming that Walters and Swift were part of a Jacobite conspiracy. After eleven hours the jury finally brought in a guilty verdict.

== Swift's Elegy ==
Swift developed a deep hatred of Chief Justice Whitshed, with whom he clashed again over the Drapier Letters, and he did not forget or forgive Boate either. Shortly after Boate's death, he wrote a mocking satire, consisting largely of puns on the judge's name:

"To mournful ditties Clio, change thy note

Since cruel fate hath sunk our Justice Boat...

Behold the awful Bench on which he sat

He was as hard and ponderous wood as that...

Charon in him will ferry souls to Hell

A trade our Boat hath practiced here so well....

A Boat a judge! Yes, where's the blunder?

A wooden judge is no such wonder...."
