= Luffield Abbey =

Former civil parish in Buckinghamshire, England

Coordinates: 52.071°N 1.026°W

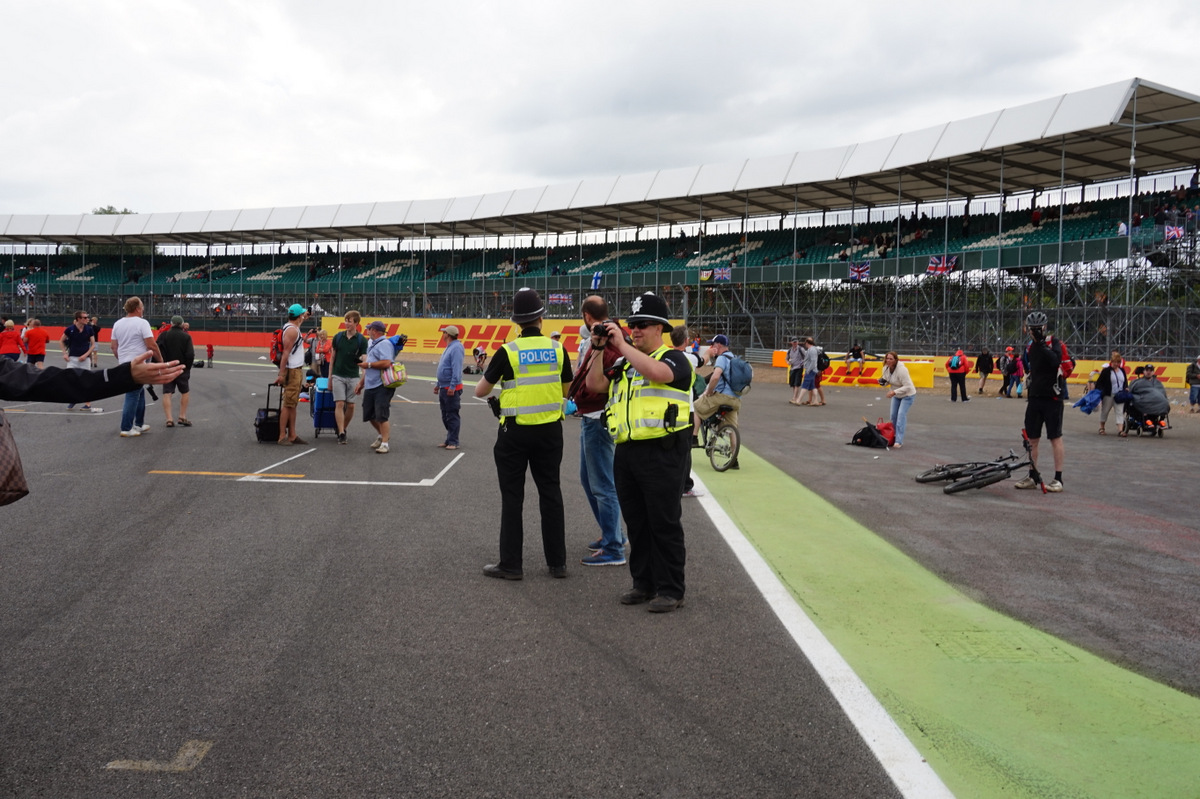

- Location within Buckinghamshire
- Civil parish: Lillingstone Dayrell with Luffield Abbey
- Unitary authority: Buckinghamshire
- Ceremonial county: Buckinghamshire
- Region: South East
- Country: England
- Sovereign state: United Kingdom

Luffield Abbey was formerly a civil parish in Buckinghamshire, England, adjoining the border with Northamptonshire. It had its origins as the estate of Luffield Priory, which was an extra-parochial area that straddled Buckinghamshire and Northamptonshire. The Northamptonshire part was added to the parish of Silverstone in 1844, after which Luffield Abbey was wholly in Buckinghamshire. Such extra-parochial areas were converted into civil parishes in 1858. The civil parish was abolished in 2001 and the area now forms part of the parish of Lillingstone Dayrell with Luffield Abbey.

== Priory of Luffield ==
The place takes its name from the Benedictine priory of Luffield, founded by Robert, 2nd Earl of Leicester some time before 1133. The priory was suppressed in 1494, by which time the priory was in ruins and there were only two monks. The lands were then granted to Westminster Abbey.

There was no trace of the ancient abbey in a land survey conducted in 1732. The remains of the abbey were found on the edge of the south east runway of the airfield which is now part of Silverstone Circuit, about 200 metres north east of Stowe Corner. Markings of the foundations can be seen in discolorations in the grass on some aerial images taken in the early 1990s. Human remains were found near the abbey in the 1970s. They were found to be monks who had been sufferers of the plague and buried face down.

Two corners of the circuit are named after the location: turn 1 is known as Abbey and turn 7 as Luffield.

== Subsequent history ==
In 1551, after the Dissolution, the manor was granted to Francis Throckmorton. In 1718 it passed to his descendant Richard Temple, 1st Viscount Cobham of Stowe, and passed with the Stowe estates until the mid 19th century.

Luffield Abbey was an extra-parochial area, until 1844 partly in Northamptonshire and partly in Buckinghamshire. In 1844 the part in the former county was transferred to the Northamptonshire parish of Silverstone so that Luffield Abbey was entirely within Buckinghamshire thereafter. In 1858 it became a separate civil parish.

The parish consisted of a single farm. By 1931 the population of the parish had dropped to 2. In 1971 the parish had a population of 0. On 1 April 2001 the parish was abolished and merged with Lillingstone Dayrell to form "Lillingstone Dayrell with Luffield Abbey". The name was also given to the northernmost ward of the former Aylesbury Vale District Council.
