= Stowe, Buckinghamshire =

Civil parish in Buckinghamshire, England

Coordinates: 52.018°N 1.017°W

Stowe
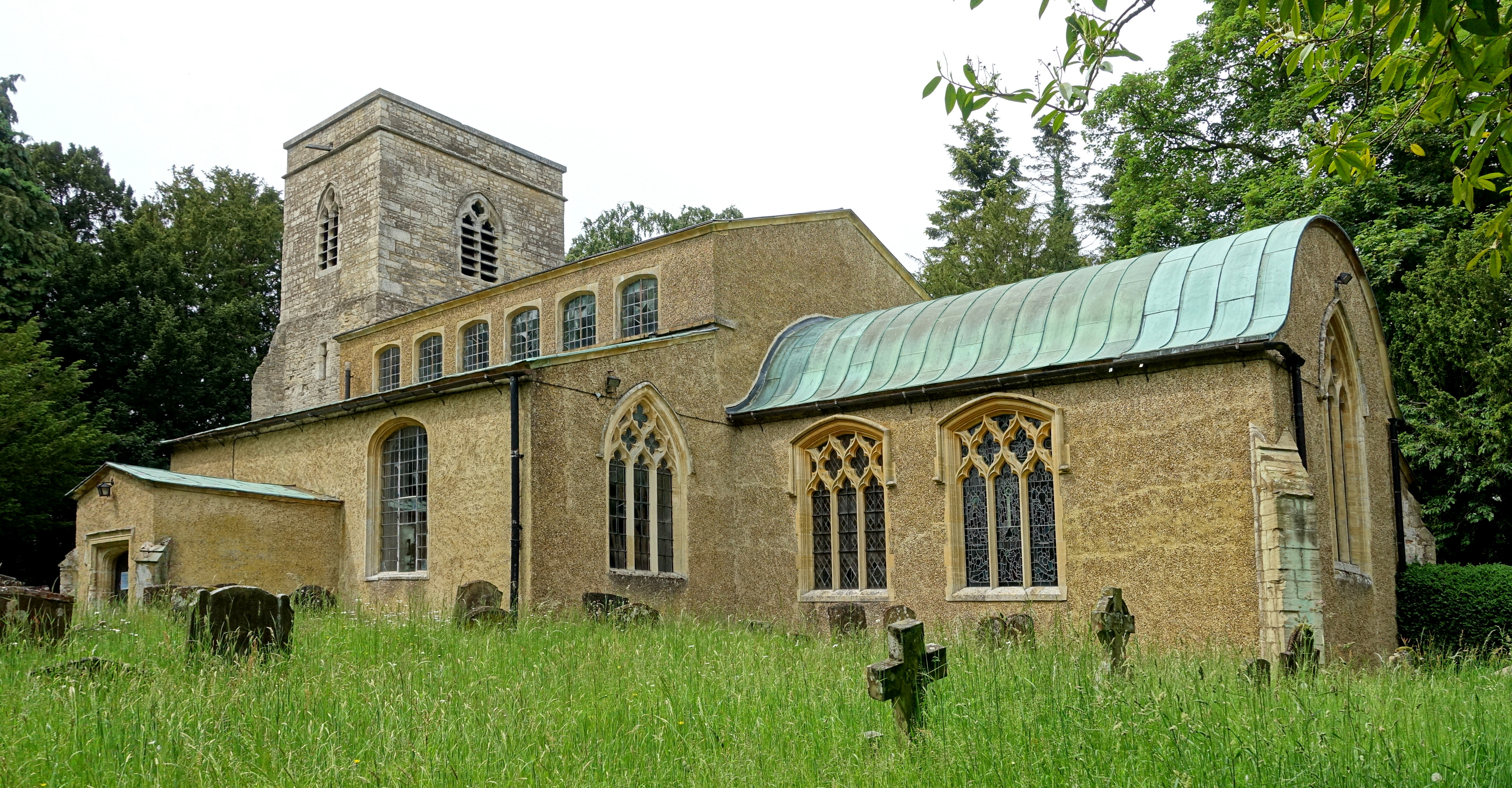
- Parish church of the Assumption of the Blessèd Virgin Mary

- Location within Buckinghamshire
- Population: 886 (2011 Census)
- OS grid reference: SP6836
- Civil parish: Stowe
- Unitary authority: Buckinghamshire
- Ceremonial county: Buckinghamshire
- Region: South East
- Country: England
- Sovereign state: United Kingdom
- Post town: Buckingham
- Postcode district: MK18
- Dialling code: 01280
- Police: Thames Valley
- Fire: Buckinghamshire
- Ambulance: South Central
- UK Parliament: Buckingham and Bletchley

Stowe is a civil parish and former village about two miles (three kilometres) northwest of Buckingham in the unitary authority area of Buckinghamshire, England. The parish includes the hamlets of Boycott, Dadford and Lamport.

Stowe House is a Grade I listed country house in the parish and is occupied by Stowe School.

== History ==
"Stowe", an ancient Anglo-Saxon word for a 'place'

Stowe's toponym probably refers to an ancient holy place of great significance in Anglo-Saxon times. The manor of Stowe predates the Norman conquest of England. The Domesday Book of 1086 assessed the manor at five hides. It listed William the Conqueror's half-brother Odo, Bishop of Bayeux as the manor's feudal overlord and the Norman brothers-in-arms Robert D'Oyly and Roger d'Ivry as his tenants. D'Oyly founded Oxford Castle and he and d'Ivry founded a college of secular canons there. Not long after 1086 the manor of Stowe was transferred to the college's endowment, confirmed by a charter of Henry I in 1130.

By 1150 the Augustinians of Osney Abbey had absorbed the college, and in 1278–79 it held three hides at Stowe. Osney Abbey retained Stowe until it was forced to surrender its estates to the Crown in the Dissolution of the Monasteries in 1539. In 1542 the Diocese of Oxford was instituted and Osney Abbey was consecrated as its first cathedral. The abbey's former estates, including Stowe, formed the bishopric's endowment.

In 1590 John Underhill, Bishop of Oxford, conveyed Stowe to Elizabeth I, who in the same year granted it to new secular owners. They sold it to John Temple of Burton Dassett in Warwickshire, whose grandson Sir Peter Temple, 2nd Baronet enclosed a deer park in 1651. The village was probably abandoned at this time. The estate remained with the Temple-Grenville family until 1921, when it was sold by the Reverend Luis C.F.T. Morgan-Grenville (1889–1944). Stowe School was founded here in 1923.

== Parish church ==
The earliest mention of the parish church of the Assumption of the Blessèd Virgin Mary is in Henry I's charter of 1130. The oldest part of the building is the late 13th-century three-bay arcade between the nave and the north aisle. The west tower was added in the first half of the 13th century, followed by the chancel in about 1350 and the south aisle and arcade in the latter part of the 14th century. Late in the 15th century both aisles were rebuilt and the Perpendicular Gothic nave clerestory and south porch were added. In the 16th century the Perpendicular Gothic north chapel was added, with an arcade of two bays between it and the chancel. The church was altered in the 18th century and is now a Grade II* listed building.

In the late 17th century a ring of five bells was hung in the bell tower. James Keene, who had foundries at Woodstock, Oxfordshire and Bedford, cast the second, fourth and fifth bells in 1654. Richard Keene cast the third bell in 1660 and the tenor in 1665. In 1988 John Taylor & Co of Loughborough cast a new treble bell, increasing the ring to six. The church has a Sanctus bell that was cast in about 1799.

== Stowe House ==
Formerly the country seat of the Dukes of Buckingham and Chandos, Stowe House is now occupied by Stowe School. The landscaped gardens and its many monuments were acquired by the National Trust in 1990, and are open to the public. The National Trust is overseeing a restoration programme of the grounds, temples and follies.

== Stowe in film ==
Because of its picturesque surroundings Stowe has been the setting for many films, including Indiana Jones and the Last Crusade, the Bollywood film Kabhi Khushi Kabhi Gham, Proof of Life, Stardust (2007), and The World Is Not Enough in the James Bond series.

== Notable people ==
The teacher, author and murder victim Peter Farquhar taught at Stowe School and worshipped and preached at Stowe Parish Church.

== Sources and further reading ==
- Ekwall, Eilert (1960) [1947]. Concise Oxford Dictionary of English Place-Names. Oxford: Oxford University Press. ISBN 0198691033.
- Page, William, ed. (1927). "Stowe". A History of the County of Buckingham, Volume 4. Victoria County History. pp. 229–237.
- Pevsner, Nikolaus (1973) [1966]. Buckinghamshire. The Buildings of England. Harmondsworth, UK: Penguin Books. pp. 251–265. ISBN 0-14-071019-1.
