= William Delaune =

English clergyman and academic (1659–1728)

William Delaune D.D. (14 April 1659 – 23 May 1728) was an English clergyman and academic, President of St John's College, Oxford, and chaplain to Queen Anne.

== Life ==
Delaune was son of Benjamin Delaune of London, England, by Margaret, daughter of George Coney, born 14 April 1659. He entered Merchant Taylors' School 11 September 1672, proceeded to St John's College, Oxford, in 1675, graduated B.A. in 1679, M.A. in 1683, and B.D. in 1688. Having taken holy orders, he became chaplain to Peter Mews, bishop of Winchester, who presented him to the living of Chilbolton, Hampshire. He subsequently held that of South Warnborough, Wiltshire.

In 1697, he proceeded D.D., and on 14 March 1698 was elected President of St John's. Installed canon of Winchester in 1701, he was appointed Vice-Chancellor of the Oxford University in October of the following year. His tenure of this office, which lasted until October 1706, was more profitable to himself than to the university. Thomas Hearne claims that he was nicknamed "Gallio" by his systematic neglect of his duties, and charges him with embezzling the contents of the University Chest. Delaune made advances to himself out of the university exchequer to the extent of £3,000, which he did not repay. His successor William Lancaster made attempts to recover the money, apparently without much success, and subsequent vice-chancellors were less exacting. He paid a composition of £300. in full discharge of the debt in 1719. He was a gambler, losing heavily, and this was regarded as a scandal. Hearne mentions that a candidate taunted him in public with the comment Jacta est alea; the same story is told in Terrae Filius, the author of which, Nicholas Amhurst, Delaune is said to have expelled from St John's. Amhurst's own mocking account of his 1719 expulsion from Oxford was dedicated to Delaune, and mixes satire inextricably with politics.

Delaune was elected Margaret Lecturer in Divinity on 18 February 1715, and installed prebendary of Worcester. He was also one of Queen Anne's chaplains, and acquired some reputation as a preacher. He died on 23 May 1728, and was buried without the usual eulogistic epitaph in St John's College Chapel. Delaune published in 1728 Twelve Sermons upon several Subjects and Occasions, dedicated to Montagu Venables-Bertie, 2nd Earl of Abingdon.

== Sources ==
- This article incorporates text from a publication now in the public domain: "Delaune, William (1659–1728)". Dictionary of National Biography. London: Smith, Elder & Co. 1885–1900.

Academic offices
Preceded by William Levinz	President of St John's College, Oxford; 1698–1728	Succeeded by William Holmes
Preceded by Roger Mander	Vice-Chancellor of Oxford University; 1702–1706	Succeeded by William Lancaster
