= Lillingstone Dayrell =

Village in Buckinghamshire, England

Coordinates: 52.0494°N 0.9787°W

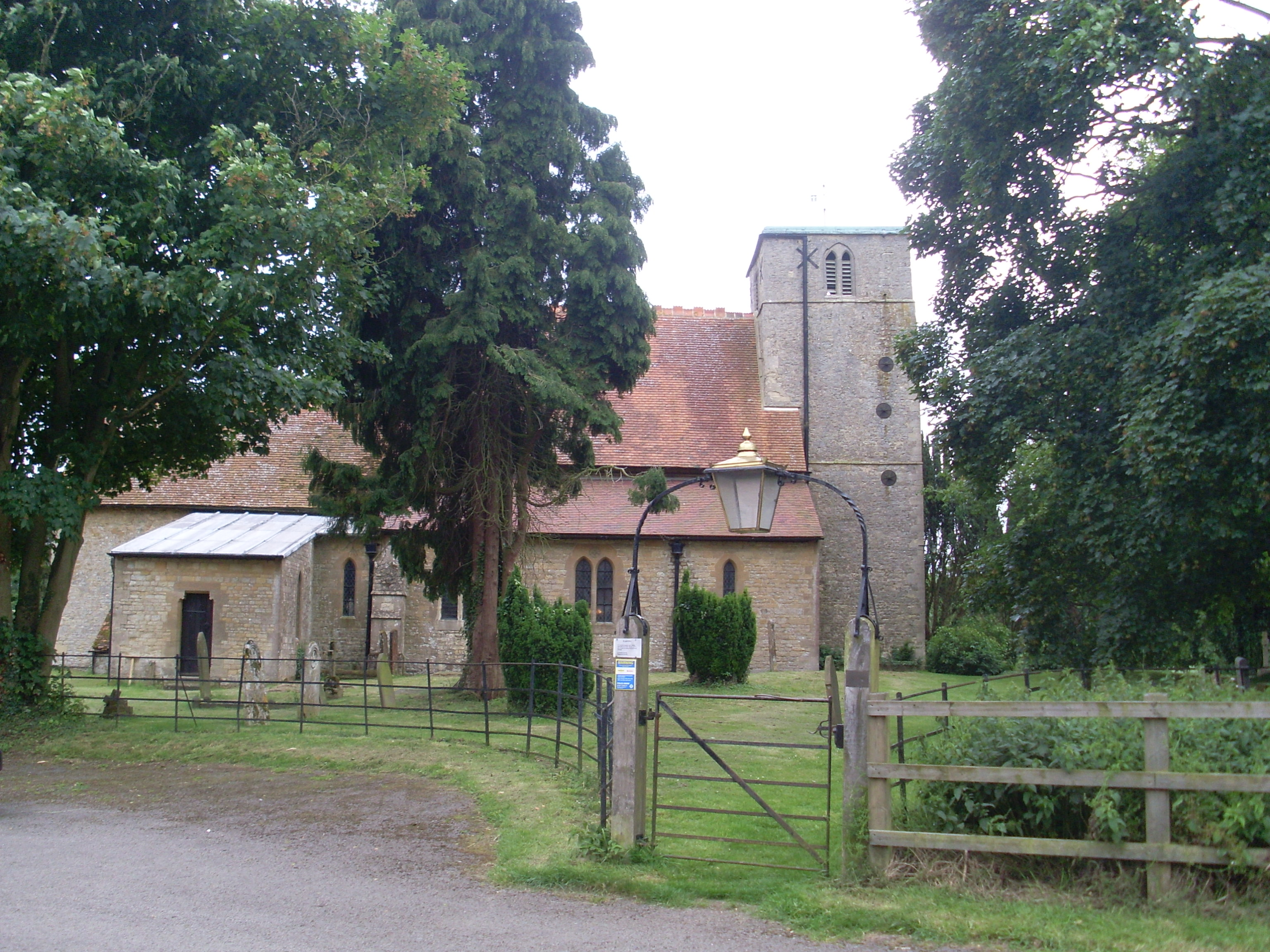
- St Nicholas Church, Lillingstone Dayrell, 2009

- Location within Buckinghamshire
- Population: 100 (Lillingstone Dayrell with Luffield Abbey parish, 2021)
- OS grid reference: SP705395
- Civil parish: Lillingstone Dayrell with Luffield Abbey
- Unitary authority: Buckinghamshire
- Ceremonial county: Buckinghamshire
- Region: South East
- Country: England
- Sovereign state: United Kingdom
- Post town: BUCKINGHAM
- Postcode district: MK18
- Dialling code: 01280
- Police: Thames Valley
- Fire: Buckinghamshire
- Ambulance: South Central
- UK Parliament: Buckingham and Bletchley

Lillingstone Dayrell is a village in the civil parish of Lillingstone Dayrell with Luffield Abbey, in Buckinghamshire, England. It is about three and a half miles north of Buckingham, eight miles west of Milton Keynes and five miles south of Towcester. At the 2021 census the population of the civil parish was 100.

== History ==
The village name 'Lillingstone' is Anglo Saxon in origin, and means 'Lytel's boundary stone', referring to the proximity of both places to the border with Northamptonshire. In the Domesday Book of 1086, both settlements were recorded jointly as Lillingestan though already at that time there were two manors owned respectively by the Dayrell and Lovell families. The suffix 'Dayrell' (as 'Dayerell') was first recorded in the fourteenth century. The Dayrell family were Lords of the Manor from the fourteenth century until the 1880s.

Lillingstone Dayrell was an ancient parish. In 2001 the parish absorbed the area of the neighbouring parish of Luffield Abbey, which was abolished. The enlarged parish was renamed Lillingstone Dayrell with Luffield Abbey at the same time. At the 1971 census (the penultimate one before the merger with Luffield Abbey and rename), Lillingstone Dayrell had a population of 141.

== Notable buildings ==
The parish church of Lillingstone Dayrell is dedicated to St Nicholas of Myra.

Lillingstone House is the ancient seat of the Dayrell family.

In 1882, the banker Abraham John Robarts, of Robarts, Lubbock & Co., then the tenant of Lillingstone House, built Tile House in the village for himself, designed by Ewan Christian. This is described by Nikolaus Pevsner as “Neo-Elizabethan, big and forbidding with groups of huge chimneys.”

== Notable people ==
- Gerald Robarts (1878–1961), banker, soldier, and notable squash player, lived at Lillingstone Dayrell House.
