= David James, Baron James of Blackheath =

British businessman (born 1937)

The Right Honourable The Lord James of Blackheath CBE
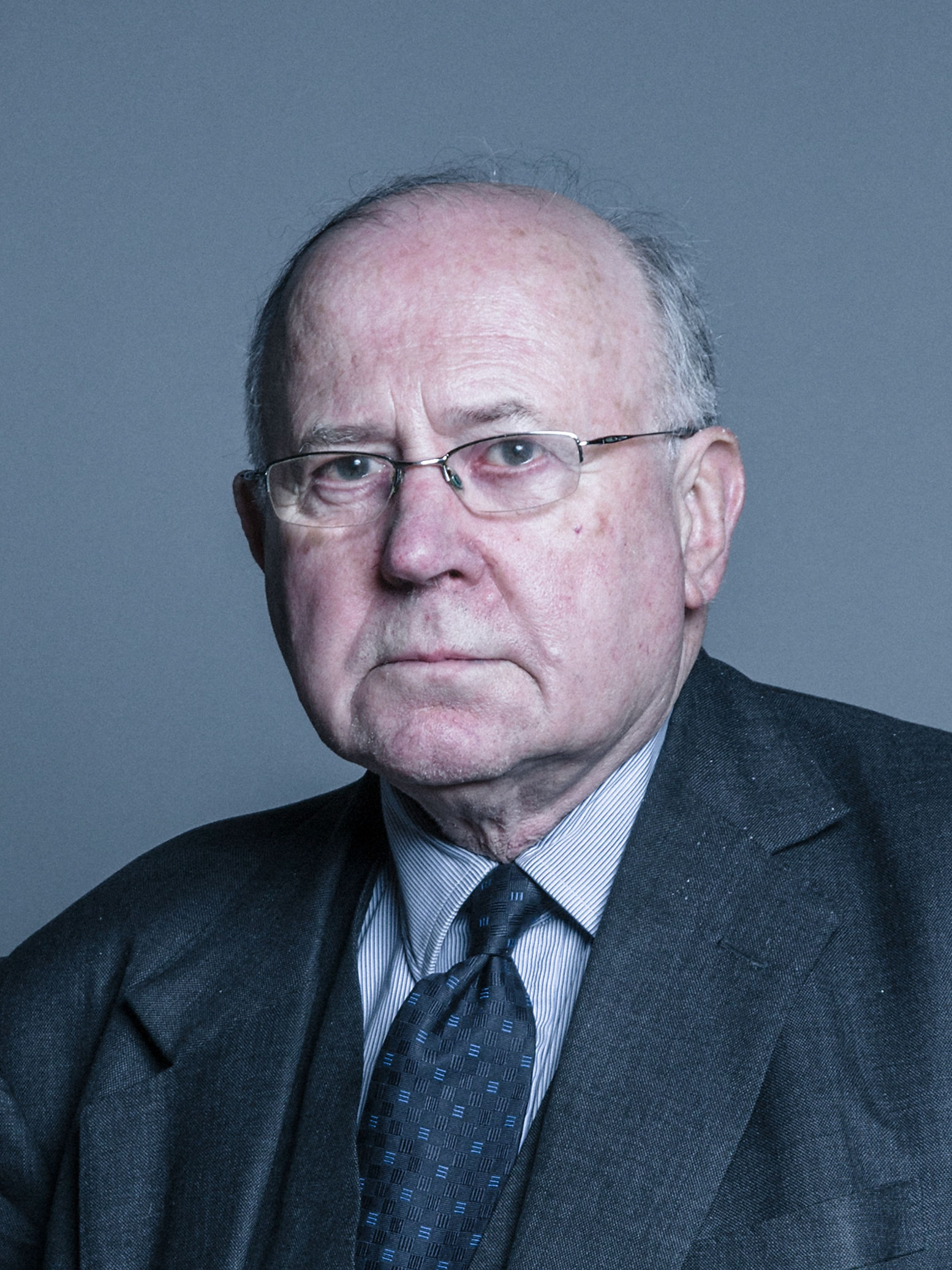

Member of the House of Lords
- Lord Temporal
- Life peerage 9 June 2006

Personal details
- Born: 7 December 1937 (age 88)

David Noel James, Baron James of Blackheath CBE (born 7 December 1937) is a British businessman and corporate troubleshooter and Conservative life peer.

== Career ==
James has had a varied career in the City of London. He trained with Lloyds Bank between 1959 and 1964, joining Ford Credit's launch team in the latter year. He then became a director of many companies, often those in trouble, to assist their recovery: in 1973 he joined Cork Gulley to rescue Cedar Holdings; in 1989 he was appointed chairman of Eagle Trust; other directorships have included British Shoe Corporation, LEP group, Dan-Air, North Sea Assets and Central & Sheerwood.

During his time at Eagle Trust he triggered the Iraqi supergun affair. Whilst visiting Eagle-owned Walter Somers factory in Halesowen in 1990, he noticed the muzzle of what appeared to be a large gun. He informed MI6, giving them one of their first leads. He served a term under David Rowland on the Council of Lloyd's, and chaired a committee which controversially allowed corporate capital to underwrite on more favourable terms.

In late 2000, James was appointed as chairman of the ailing Millennium Dome project, a high-profile position, and was credited with saving the attraction from financial collapse. In 2005 he attempted to make a bid for troubled carmakers MG Rover.

Ahead of the 2005 general election, James conducted a review for the Conservative Party that identified £35 billion of state sector savings. The disputed figures were heavily used by then-Conservative leader Michael Howard. After the Conservatives were defeated by the incumbent Labour Party, Howard and Shadow Chancellor George Osborne appointed James to head a new Conservative watchdog to monitor the way the Blair government delivered on its promises to cut costs.

In April 2006, it was announced that James had been nominated for a life peerage by the Conservative Party The news had already been revealed in a list leaked to The Times that eventually led to the Cash for Peerages scandal. James himself had given a relatively small amount to the Conservatives. He was created Baron James of Blackheath, of Wildbrooks in the County of West Sussex on 9 June 2006.

In November 2010, Lord James claimed in the House of Lords that he had been approached by a secretive "megarich" organisation, which James referred to only as 'Foundation X', willing to lend billions of pounds, interest-free, to the UK government.

James was vocal about his concerns for the financial management of the London 2012 Olympics.

He has worked as a Consultant for Cerberus Capital Management.

Lord James is married to a woman from Leeds but has no children. He has a particular interest in music and cricket. He is Chairman of the British Racing Club of horses.

== "Foundation X" speech ==
James attracted some press and blog attention after a speech in the House of Lords on 1 November 2010, in which he claimed to have been approached by an unnamed organisation wishing to fund massive public works projects in the UK with vast currency reserves backed by gold bullion. A Labour Party staff member and political blogger who wrote about the story speculated that the organisation in question was the Office of International Treasury Control, possibly an organisation though unknown or unacknowledged by any government to date. However, James has stated that he had not been approached by the Office of International Treasury Control, that there were no links between Foundation X and the Office of International Treasury Control, that Foundation X was a viable organisation, and that the offer was in good faith. Further, in the course of the recorded speech, James uses a comparison to the "total value of the Vatican Bank Reserves" to denounce the validity of the "total amount of bullion ever taken from the earth's crust" as given by a "12-year-old issue of National Geographic" (the single source for this figure), which had been used by Lord Strathclyde to dismiss the claim for the assets of Foundation X to be backed by bullion. In this speech Lord James of Blackheath neither identified Foundation X with the Vatican or the Vatican Bank, nor did he hint at any such connection.

== "Fed Fraud" speech ==
James attracted some press and blog attention after another speech in the House of Lords on 16 February 2012, in which he claimed a massive $15 trillion money-laundering fraud from the United States Federal Reserve in the name of "Yohannes Riyadi"—a man who may or may not exist. James offered to provide evidence and asked for an official investigation (Hansard, transcription 16 February 2012, Column 1016, from 5:20 pm).

== Arms ==
Coat of arms of David James, Baron James of Blackheath
Adopted 2007 Coronet Coronet of a Baron Crest Statant upon a Violin Bridge Gules a Cricket Or Escutcheon Quarterly Or and Argent on a Cross Gules between four Trumpets in saltire bells outwards Gules banded Or a Cross quarterly Argent and Or Supporters On either side a Greyhound Gules gorged with a plain Collar attached thereto a Chain reflexed over the back Or holding in the mouth a Rose Argent barbed seeded slipped and leaved Or Motto NUMQUAM AMITTO Badge Three Escallops in pall flukes inwards and abutting Gules each crowned with an Ancient Crown Or Symbolism Music, cricket and greyhounds are of particular interest to the grantee. Music is represented by the violin bridge and trumpets with cricket by the cricket insect. There is a variation on St George's cross and the escallops in the Badge are the emblem of St James and hence a pun on the grantee's title.

Orders of precedence in the United Kingdom
Preceded by The Lord Patel of Bradford	Gentlemen; Baron James of Blackheath	Followed by The Lord Bradley
