= William Allport Leighton =

English clergyman and botanist (1805–1889)

William Allport Leighton (17 May 1805 – 28 February 1889) was an English Church of England clergyman and botanist.

== Life ==
Born on the 17th of May 1805, he was the only son of William and Lucy Maria Leighton. His mother was the daughter and coheiress of John Allport of Prescot, near Baschurch, Shropshire. His father was the keeper of the Talbot Hotel in Shrewsbury. He went to school at the Unitarian Manse on Claremont Hill, Shrewsbury, with Charles Darwin, who first encouraged him to be interested in plants. He went on to Wolverhampton Grammar School, and in 1822 was articled to a solicitor in Shrewsbury.

On the death of his father he abandoned the study of the law in favour of the church. He matriculated at St John's College, Cambridge, and graduated B.A. in 1833. Having been a pupil of John Stevens Henslow, Leighton on his return to his native town, deferred ordination in order to draw up a flora of Shropshire. In 1843 he was ordained deacon and priest, and took on clerical duties in Shrewsbury until 1848, when he resigned his curacy at St Giles' Church, and thenceforward occupied himself entirely with botany.

Leighton suffered from deteriorating eyesight, and soon after 1879 gave up his studies; he donated his collection to the national herbarium at Kew Gardens. He died at Lucifelde, Shrewsbury, on 28 February 1889, aged eighty-three, and was buried in the Shrewsbury General Cemetery in nearby Longden Road.

== Works ==
In 1841, he brought out his Flora of Shropshire, the etchings to illustrate some of the genera being his own. He then began working on the cryptogams, and in 1851 the Ray Society published his Angiocarpous Lichens elucidated by their Sporidia. From that date onward Leighton published widely in the literature on lichens, producing as his major work Lichen Flora of Great Britain in 1871. This reached a third edition in 1879. He was editor of the Transactions of Shropshire Archaeological Society for many years. Leighton issued the exsiccata series Lichenes Britannici exsiccati.

In an 1854 work, Leighton coined the term ardella to refer to the small, spot-like fruiting bodies characteristic of the lichen family Arthoniaceae.

== Family ==
Leighton married, first, in 1827, Catherine, youngest daughter of David Parkes, a Shrewsbury antiquary, and they had one son and two daughters at her death; secondly, Mrs. Gibson, and they had a son.

== See also ==
- Category:Taxa named by William Allport Leighton
