= OITC =

OITC can stand for one of the following:

- Office of International Treasury Control
- Outdoor-Indoor Transmission Class
- One in the Chamber (Action Movie)
