= St John the Baptist Church, Halesowen =

Church in West Midlands, England

Coordinates: 52°27′01″N 2°03′03″W

Church of St John the Baptist, Halesowen
- Parish Church of Halesowen
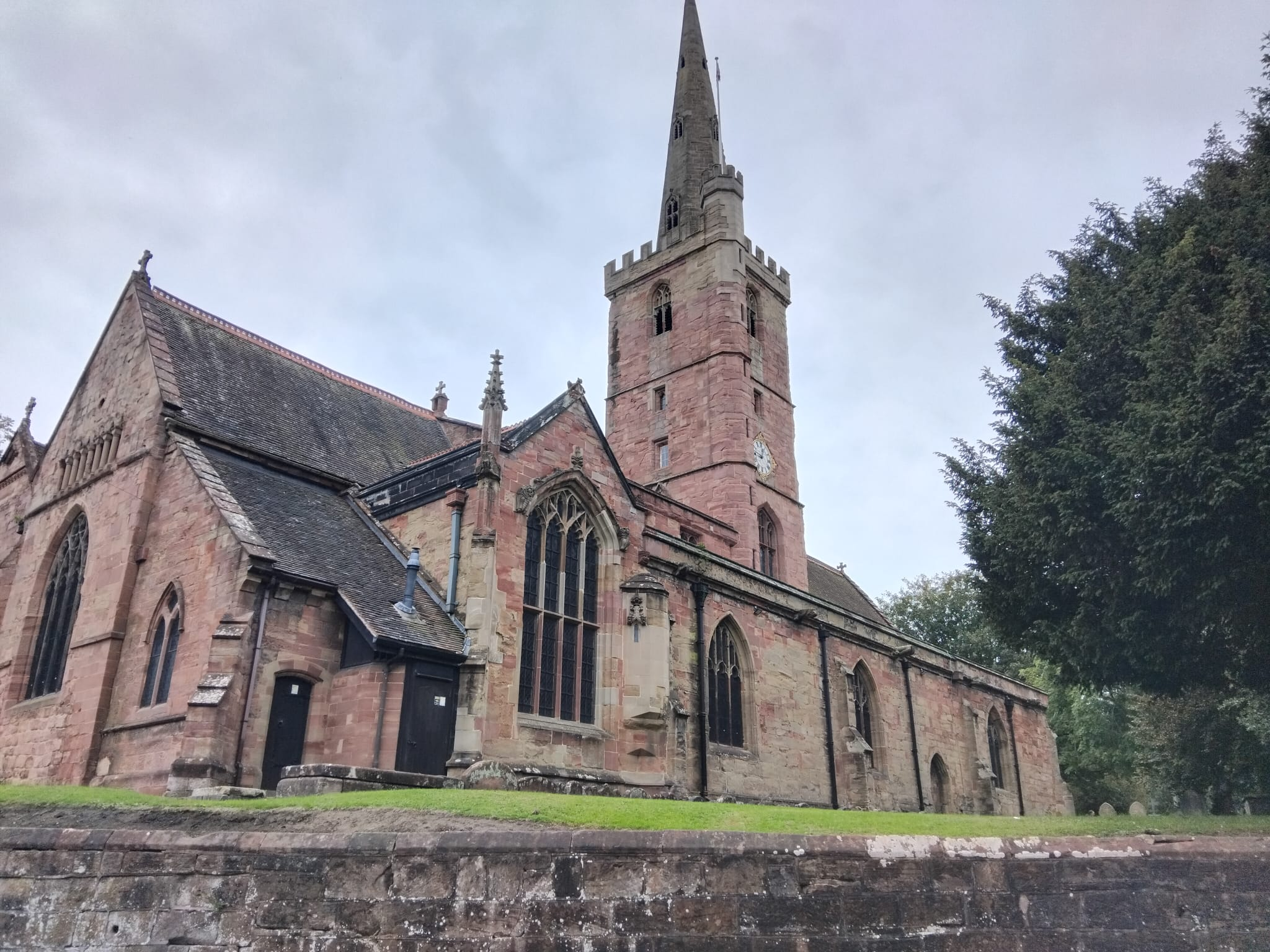
- St John the Baptist Church, Halesowen
- Church of St John the Baptist, Halesowen
- OS grid reference: SO 96636 83583
- Location: Halesowen, West Midlands, England
- Country: England
- Denomination: Church of England
- Previous denomination: Roman Catholic
- Churchmanship: Central Church

History
- Dedication: St John the Baptist

Specifications
- Materials: Red sandstone

Administration
- Province: Canterbury
- Diocese: Worcester
- Archdeaconry: Dudley
- Deanery: Dudley
- Parish: Halesowen

Clergy
- Vicar: Hazel Charlton

The Church of St John the Baptist, Halesowen, is a Grade I listed parish church in the Black Country town of Halesowen, in the West Midlands, England. It is part of the Church of England and lies within the Anglican Diocese of Worcester. Dedicated to John the Baptist, the church has stood at the centre of Halesowen's religious and civic life for over 900 years. Its 160-foot spire, a prominent landmark rising from the valley of the River Stour, can be seen for miles around.

== History ==
The Church is first mentioned in the Domesday Book of 1086, by which time it was likely to be the remains of an original Anglo-Saxon building. It states "In Clent Hundred, Earl Roger holds of the King a manor called HALAS, it contains ten hides. There are in the demesne four carucates and thirty six villeins and eighteen boarders and four radmen. A church with two priests."

"Roger" refers to Roger de Montgomery who was granted the title of Earl of Shrewsbury from his actions at The Battle of Hastings and is the original founder of the oldest parts of the current building.

Exact founding dates of the current building are difficult to establish. The Church is notable for its Norman arches, Nave and font being the oldest parts of the building dating to the early 12th Century. The west doorway was constructed soon afterwards and once served as a right of way through the Church. The Church originally was part of the endowment of Halesowen Abbey in the early 13th century.

During the Middle Ages, St John's grew in importance as the centre of a wide parish covering what is now the Black Country. Its clergy were appointed by the Abbey until its dissolution in 1538, after which responsibility passed to the Crown. The parish continued to expand with the industrialisation of the town in the 18th and 19th centuries, culminating in the building of the large outer south aisle in the 1880s.

In the Victorian period, major restoration was carried out under Richard Brindley Hone, vicar from 1836 to 1881. He introduced schemes of church refurbishment, a new Rectory, and oversaw the division of the ancient parish into five ecclesiastical districts in 1841.

== Architecture ==
The plan of the church is cruciform, consisting of a Nave, Chancel, Aisles, Cloisters, and a west tower. The south Cloister is among the largest in the traditional county Worcestershire and features fine Norman masonry.

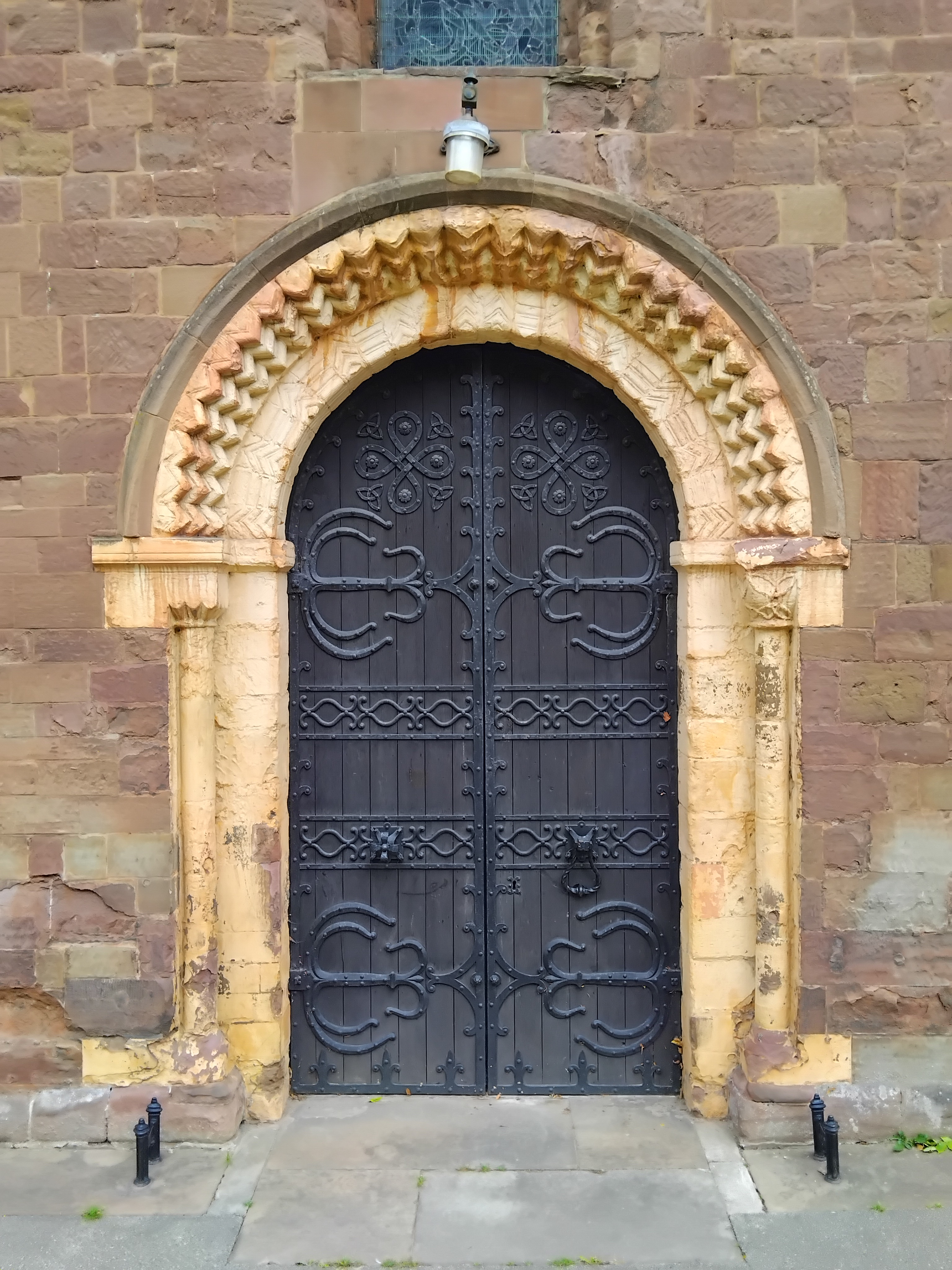
Norman arch doorway leading to the West Nave

The sanctuary includes an east wall dating from the Norman church (c. 1130–35). The tower, begun around 1390, was completed in 1440 and rises above 114 steps to the parapet, with a spire soaring a further 72 feet. The spire was restored in 1978 when its golden weathercock was regilded.

Externally, the church is notable for its lancet windows, Norman arcading which date to around 1320, and a 1901–02 restoration of the porch. The town's war memorial of 1921, designed by Sir Harold Brakspear, stands nearby.

As well as the Victorian work undertaken by Richard Howe, Lady Lyttleton of the Lyttelton family commissioned renowned Gothic-revival architect George Gilbert Scott to carry out restoration work on the south aisle and east window in 1875.

== Interior and fittings ==
The interior contains a wide range of monuments, fittings, and stained glass spanning several centuries. Features include:

- The original Norman Font, one of the oldest parts of the Church.

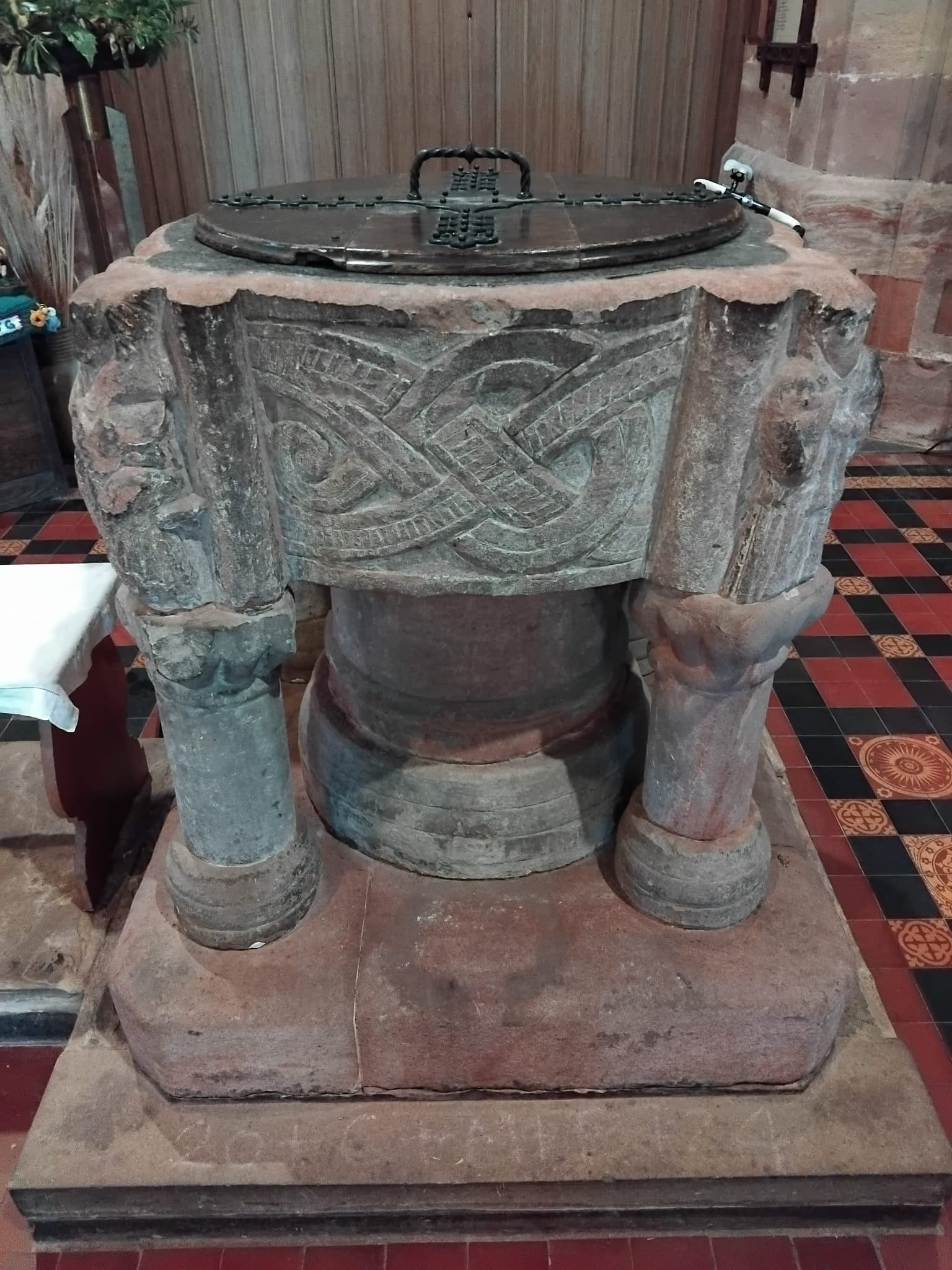
St John's Original Norman font, c.1100

- A stone coffin of 12th-century date, unearthed in 1924.
- The north cloister, now housing the Traidpoint Shop, established in the 1980s as a church and community bookshop.
- The original Norman Font, the oldest part of the building along with the Nave and Chancel.
- The Lady Chapel, originally the Varley Chapel, rededicated in 1961 as the Children's Chapel.
- The cast relief of The Last Supper behind the altar, installed in 1978.
- A rood loft installed in 1503 (later removed).
- Stained glass by notable artists, including depictions of The Ascension, The Beatitudes, and scenes from the life of Christ.

Numerous memorials commemorate local figures, such as:

- Richard Burr of the Gunbarrel Works, Hayseech (d. 1847).
- William Shenstone (1714–1763), poet and landscape gardener (known for creating The Leasowes, a Grade I listed public landscape), commemorated at the south-west corner and buried in the Church's cemetery.
- Francis Brett Young (1884–1954), poet, playwright and novelist who was born in Halesowen and buried in Worcester Cathedral. His father, Thomas Brett Young was a Churchwarden at the Church from 1903 to 1905.

== Organ ==
The organ has a long history, with records dating to 1487. A modern digital organ replaced earlier instruments in 1987, following a fundraising appeal. The present organ was dedicated in 1991.

== Tower and bells ==
The tower holds a ring of eight bells. The earliest record of bells dates to 1282, when "Peter the Bellinger" appeared in documents. The present ring includes recast bells from 1864 by John Warner & Sons and earlier examples from 1707. Inscriptions include Jesus be our speed 1707 and God bless the town of Halesowen 1707.

The tower clock faces, dating from 1895, mark the Diamond Jubilee of Queen Victoria. A World War I memorial window in the tower was installed in 1919.

== Parish ==
St John the Baptist Church is part of the Halas Team Ministry, which also includes the parish churches of Cradley, Halesowen, Hasbury, Lapal, and Romsley. The parish stretches from the countryside of the Clent Hills to the industrial hinterland of the Black Country and Birmingham. The original parish has changed much over its existence, having previously been an exclave of Shropshire.

== Vicars and rectors ==
The list of clergy at St John's is continuous from the 13th century. Early Vicars included Richard de Crowle (first Vicar, 1282) and John Poole (Canon, 1385). Later rectors include Richard Brindley Hone (1836–81), whose tenure saw major parish reforms, and Canon John Everest, rector from 1993.

== See also ==
- Halesowen Abbey
