= Diamond Bus =

Diamond Bus may refer to:

- Diamond East Midlands, bus operator in Burton on Trent, England
- Diamond North West, bus operator in the north-west of England
- Diamond South East, bus operator in south-east England
- Diamond West Midlands, bus operator in the West Midlands region of England
