= Halesowen bus station =

Bus station in the West Midlands, England

Coordinates: 52.4492°N 2.0521°W

Halesowen
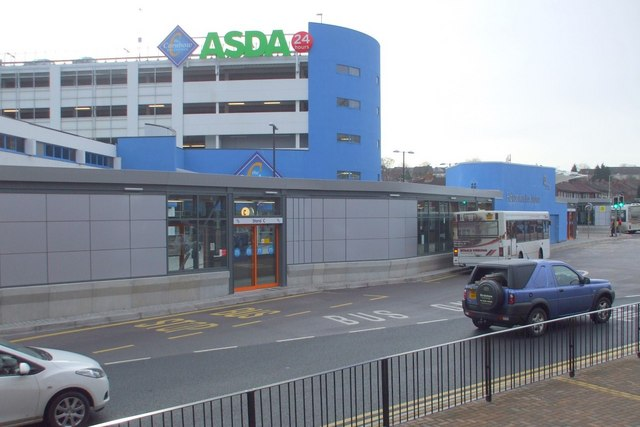

General information
- Location: Queensway, Halesowen; Metropolitan Borough of Dudley
- Operator: Transport for West Midlands
- Bus stands: 8 (A–H)
- Bus operators: National Express West Midlands, Diamond West Midlands

History
- Opened: December 2008
Location

Halesowen bus station is a bus station in the town of Halesowen in the West Midlands conurbation in England. It is owned and managed by Transport for West Midlands.

The station is located on Queensway in front of the Cornbow Centre, which houses the Asda superstore plus many other shops, and opposite Halesowen's Jobcentre Plus and Norman Church.

Originally, Halesowen had no bus station. Instead, most buses boarded adjacent to the old library building in Hagley Street/Great Cornbow, with the Service 130 (Birmingham-Stourbridge) boarding in New Road and Services 137/138 (Birmingham-Brierley Hill) at Shenstone island, some distance from the town. However, a new bus station opposite Church Croft in Queensway was constructed adjacent to the new shopping centre in the late 1960s, enabling Hagley Street to be pedestrianised. All bus services except Services 130/137/138 boarded here. However, these services were also relocated to the Bus Station from 1983 onward, following revisions to bus links into Birmingham.

The original bus station remain largely unchanged until part of the shopping centre frontage was sacrificed to enable it to be enlarged in 1999. However, it was soon clear that the station was outdated and it closed in March 2007 for a total redevelopment, which also saw a new Asda superstore opened nearby as part of a multimillion-pound regeneration of Halesowen town centre.

The present Bus Station was constructed on the same site and opened in December 2008, along with a new Asda supermarket in the Cornbow Shopping Centre towards the end of the previous month.

Whereas the original bus station permitted two-way arrival and departure along Queensway, with some stands located on a refuge on the far side from the shopping centre, all the departure stands in the present one are located on the same side as the Cornbow Centre. It features electronic departure doors that are automatically activated by arriving buses, thus permitting full passenger segregation from manoeuvring vehicles.

== Bus routes ==
Route	Destination	Via	Operator	Notes
002	Weoley Castle Merry Hill	Quinton, Bartley Green Cradley Heath, Quarry Bank	Diamond Bus	
4H	Hayley Green Walsall	Hasbury Blackheath, Oldbury, West Bromwich	National Express West Midlands	
9	Birmingham Stourbridge	Quinton Lye	National Express West Midlands	
13	Merry Hill	Fatherless Barn, Cradley, Quarry Bank	Diamond Bus	
19	Q.E. Hospital Dudley	Quinton, Harborne Old Hill, Netherton	Diamond West Midlands	
24	Merry Hill	Blackheath, Rowley Regis, Old Hill, Cradley Heath	Diamond Bus	
142	Merry Hill	Pedmore Fields, Stourbridge, Withymoor	Diamond Bus	
142A	Merry Hill	Hasbury, Belle Vale, Stourbridge, Withymoor	Diamond Bus	
147	Bromsgrove Rail Station	Romsley, Catshill, Bromsgrove	Kevs Cars & Coaches	
192	Kidderminster	Hagley, Blakedown	Diamond Bus	
202	Bromsgrove	Quinton, Woodgate, Frankley Green, Rubery, Lickey	Diamond Bus	
217	Merry Hill	Halesowen, Old Hill, Cradley Heath	Blackheath	Diamond Bus
X10	Birmingham Gornal Wood	Quinton Cradley Heath, Merry Hill, Russells Hall, Pensnett	National Express West Midlands	
X21	Birmingham Merry Hill	Quinton, Bartley Green, Weoley Castle, Selly Oak, Edgbaston Cradley Heath, Quarry Bank	National Express West Midlands	Sundays only
