= Hasbury =

Suburb of Halesowen, West Midlands, England

Coordinates: 52.442412°N 2.0673877°W

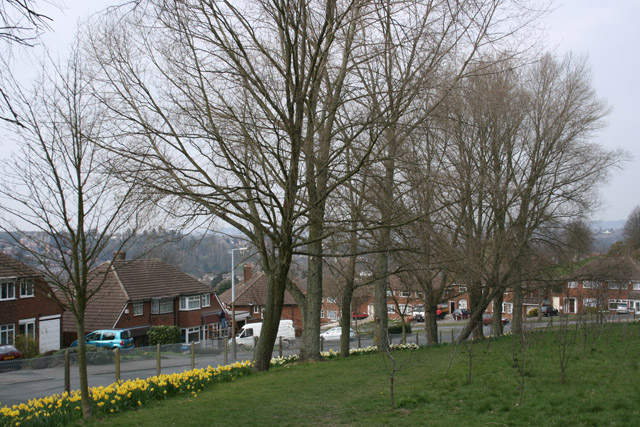

- Location within the West Midlands
- OS grid reference: SO955827
- Metropolitan borough: Dudley
- Metropolitan county: West Midlands
- Region: West Midlands
- Country: England
- Sovereign state: United Kingdom
- Post town: Halesowen
- Postcode district: B63
- Dialling code: 0121
- Police: West Midlands
- Fire: West Midlands
- Ambulance: West Midlands
- UK Parliament: Halesowen

Hasbury is a suburb of Halesowen, in the Metropolitan Borough of Dudley in county of the West Midlands, England. Its main focal point is the small shopping centre at the Wassell Road/Hagley Road junction, surrounded to the north by municipal housing development (Albrighton Road and Philip Road) and with owner-occupier housing estates located to the south (the Huntlands) and west (Rosemary Road). The local primary school is St Margaret's at Hasbury Church of England Primary School, which is located on Hagley Road adjacent to St. Margaret of Antioch church.

It is served by bus routes 142, 192 and 417. The nearest bus station is Halesowen bus station.

== History ==
Originally a township in the parish of Halesowen it became a separate civil parish in 1866 and was made part of the Halesowen Rural District by the Local Government Act 1894. From 1925 this became the Halesowen urban district. In 1951 the parish had a population of 7933. On 1 April 1974 the parish was abolished and it became part of the Dudley Metropolitan Borough in the West Midlands, because of the Local Government Act 1972. During the 19th century and before, Hasbury was a small hamlet consisting of mainly farms and agricultural land with the main thoroughfare being, as it is today, Hagley Road. These farms were dotted either side of the Hagley road and included Hasbury Farm (at the rear of what is now the Tesco Express), High Farm (Now High Farm Road) Cherrytree Farm (rear of the former Fox Hunt Pub, now Harvester), Bassnage Farm (now Bassnage Road), Lutley Farm, Yewtree Farm (approx. location of Yew Tree Road). These farms for the most part were built of large red sandstone blocks taken from the nearby Hasbury Quarry located off Quarry Hill which now forms parts of Hasbury School's playing fields.

By the mid 20th century the majority of these historic farms had been sold off and demolished with their extensive fields and land sold off for new housing estates.

Whereas the areas of Lower Hasbury (towards Lutley) were mainly farmland, the areas of Upper Hasbury contained some areas of Victorian terraced housing and some small villas focused around Hagley Road and the former stretch once known as Spring Hill (the stretch containing Lidl today) During the mid to late 19th century this area in particular became a hub of home industry. As Agriculture waned and the Industrial Revolution gained momentum, Hasbury and other areas of Halesowen began to focus not on farm labouring but in nail making, for which Halesowen became well known. Cottages and terraced houses alike would often build small forges and workshops adjoin their homes or as separate building in back gardens. One example of a nail makers shop was located on Church Street and was rebuilt at the Black Country Living Museum where it stands today. Only one example of a nail maker's cottage and nail shop exists intact today in Hasbury which is located on Hagley Road, opposite Hasbury Primary School. The cottage dates back to the mid to late 18th Century and is constructed of the local Hasbury sandstone, a stone once common in the area. It was originally a farm labourer's cottage probably working for a local farm such as High Farm or Hasbury Farm. This was then extended c1880 to form a small brick nail shop for the whole family to work in making nails. This cottage was listed Grade II by English Heritage in September 2013 and is the only building to be nationally recognized in Hasbury and protected by law. The cottage remains in a derelict condition.
