= Amos Green =

English painter

Amos Green (1735–1807) was a British painter.

== Life ==
Green was born at Halesowen, near Birmingham, where his family owned a small property, and was apprenticed to Baskerville, the Birmingham printer. He was chiefly occupied in painting trays and boxes, but soon developed a love of painting and drawing. His specialty lay in flower and fruit pieces, some of the former being imitations of Jean-Baptiste Monnoyer and Jan van Huysum. Later in life he took to landscape painting with some success.

His residence at Halesowen brought him the friendship of William Shenstone, the poet, and of George, lord Lyttelton, both being neighbours. With another neighbour at Hagley, Anthony Deane, he became so intimate that he was received into his family as one of its members, and moved with them to Bergholt in Suffolk, and eventually to Bath.

He was a good landscape gardener. In 1760 he sent two paintings of fruit to the first exhibition of the Incorporated Society of Artists, and exhibited again in 1763 and 1765. On 8 September 1796 he married at Bridlington Miss Lister, a native of York. He eventually settled at Bridlington, but thenceforth did little important work in painting, spending time in sketching tours with his wife. He died at York on 10 June 1807, in his seventy-third year. He was buried at Fulford, and a monument to his memory was put up in St Mary, Castlegate at York. His widow published a memoir of him after his death, to which a portrait, engraved by W. T. Fry from a drawing by R. Hancock, is prefixed.

== Works ==
There are three watercolour landscapes by him in the British Museum, including a view of Sidmouth Bay. Some of his works were made into prints, notably Partridges, as a mezzotint by Richard Earlom.

== Family ==
He is sometimes stated to have been a brother of Valentine Green, the engraver, but this does not appear to be the case.

Benjamin and John Green seem to have been his brothers. The latter, probably a pupil of the eldest James Basire, engraved plates from William Borlase's drawings for the 'Natural History of Cornwall' (1758), and also views for the 'Oxford Almanack,' besides some portraits, including one of Dr. Shaw, principal of St Edmund Hall, Oxford.
