= Diamond West Midlands =

Bus operator in the West Midlands of England

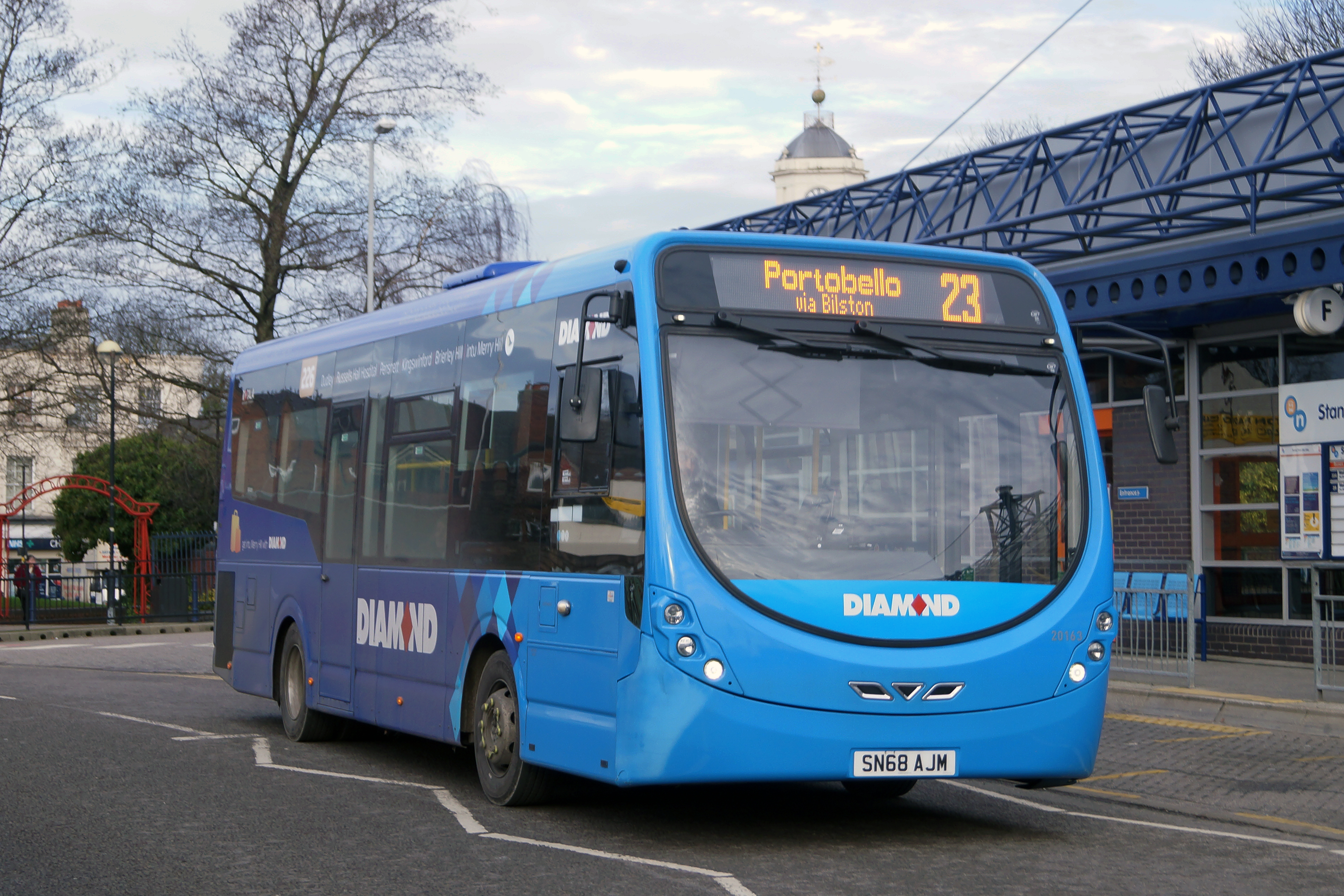
- Wright StreetLite at Bilston bus station in January 2020
- Parent: Rotala
- Founded: 1984 (as Birmingham Coach Company); 2000 (as Diamond Bus)
- Headquarters: Tividale
- Service area: West Midlands
- Service type: Bus services
- Depots: 5
- Chief executive: Simon Dunn
- Website: www.diamondbuses.com

Diamond Bus Ltd., trading as Diamond West Midlands, is a bus operator in the West Midlands. It is a subsidiary of Rotala.

== History ==
=== Birmingham Coach Company & Diamond Bus ===
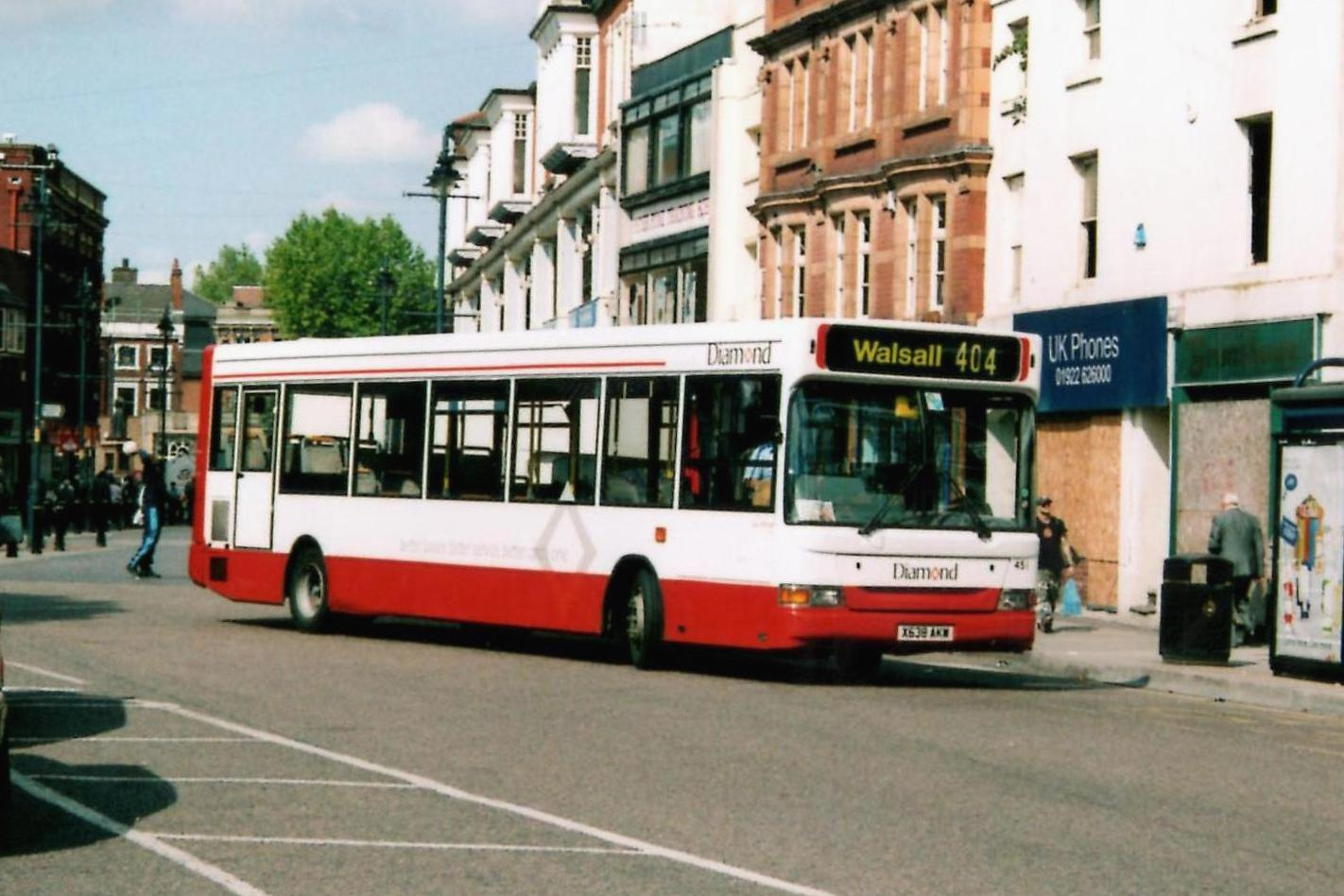
Plaxton Pointer bodied Dennis Dart in Walsall in June 2007

In 1984, Geoff Howle commenced a coach operation trading as the Birmingham Coach Company. Following deregulation of the bus industry in 1986, Howle applied to operate route 16 between Hamstead and Birmingham in competition with West Midlands Travel. Other services subsequently operated included service 120 (now service 12) between Dudley and Birmingham and service 50 between Birmingham and Druids Heath. Service 16 and 50 are still operated by successor Diamond Bus. Buses used were predominately Leyland Nationals.

In 2000, the Birmingham Coach Company changed its name to Diamond Bus to replace many of their existing Leyland Nationals, expanding their network in Birmingham and the Black Country. By 2003, Diamond Bus had become a National Express contractor and opened a depot in Bradford.

=== Go West Midlands ===
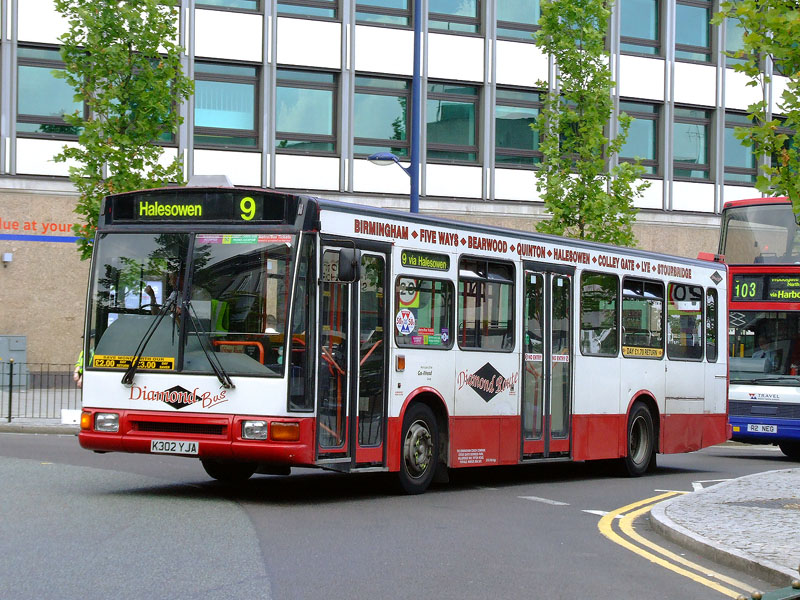
Go West Midlands' (trading as Diamond Bus) K302 YJA

On 2 December 2005, the Go-Ahead Group purchased Diamond Bus, following this with the purchase of Probus Management, trading as People's Express, in February 2006. The two companies were merged to form Go West Midlands, starting operations under the name Diamond Bus with a fleet of over 100 buses.

In 2006, Diamond relaunched its image by increasing its frequency on route 16, matching that of competitor Travel West Midlands, and also increased frequencies on routes 17, 63, 64, 74 and 87. However, in November 2007, Diamond withdrew its services on routes 17 and 63 and majorly altered its operations on routes 74 and 87, cutting parts of the routes off completely. Diamond also lost many Centro and Staffordshire County Council contracts to other operators.

=== Rotala Group ===
In March 2008, Go West Midlands was sold to Rotala, who also owned Central Connect and North Birmingham Busways. Rotala originally kept the Diamond business separate from Central Connect and Ludlows (purchased later), instead switching a number of routes between the three operators. From November 2011, Central Connect was re-branded as Blue Diamond.

=== Red Diamond & Black Diamond ===
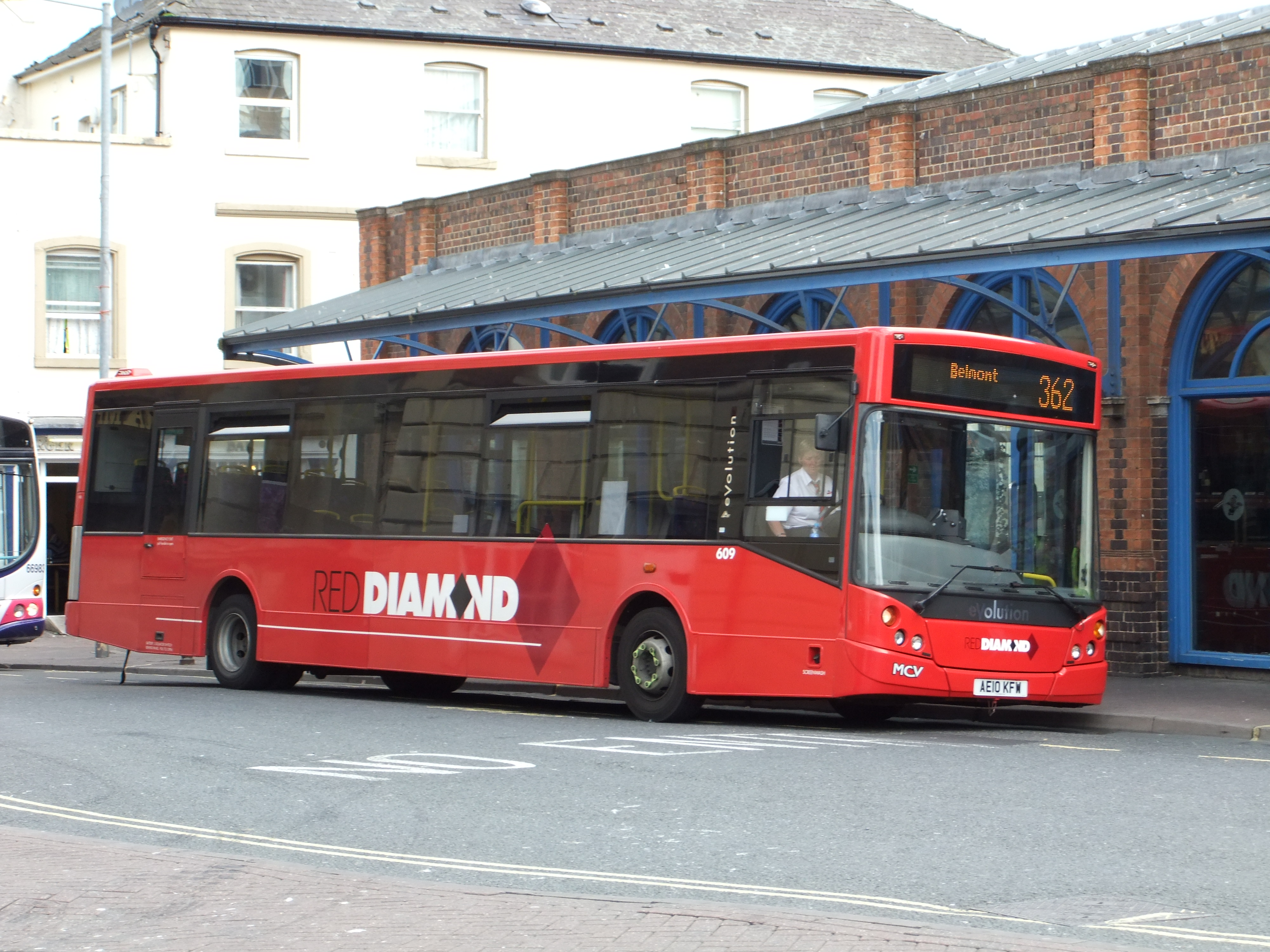
MCV Evolution bodied MAN 14.240 in Red Diamond livery in June 2011

In July 2008, new buses were put into service in Redditch on routes 57 and 58, branded as Red Diamond. Since then, a number of routes in North Worcestershire were re-branded as Red Diamond, alongside the launch of new routes in competition with First Midland Red in Redditch. At the same time, new buses were allocated to a number of Black Country routes, branded as Black Diamond. First Midland Red subsequently sold both its Redditch and Kidderminster depots to Diamond Bus.

== Diamond Staffordshire ==
The Diamond Staffordshire brand was introduced in late 2012 for the company's services around the Lichfield area.

Following the purchase of Central Buses, Diamond took on operations in Lichfield such as 35 to Walsall. This service was subsequently taken over by Arriva Midlands and operated from their Wednesfield depot, acquired with the purchase of Liyell Limited (t/a Midland), until operations from there were sold to Diamond Bus, which brought Diamond back on to the 35 route.

The 35B service through Stonnall was scrapped in 2019 and replaced by the 36, operated by Select Bus Services until 2023. Services 35A/36 are now operated by Chaserider.

== Diamond West Midlands ==
In late 2012, Blue Diamond, Black Diamond and Signature became Diamond West Midlands, operating services across the West Midlands.

=== Black Diamond ===
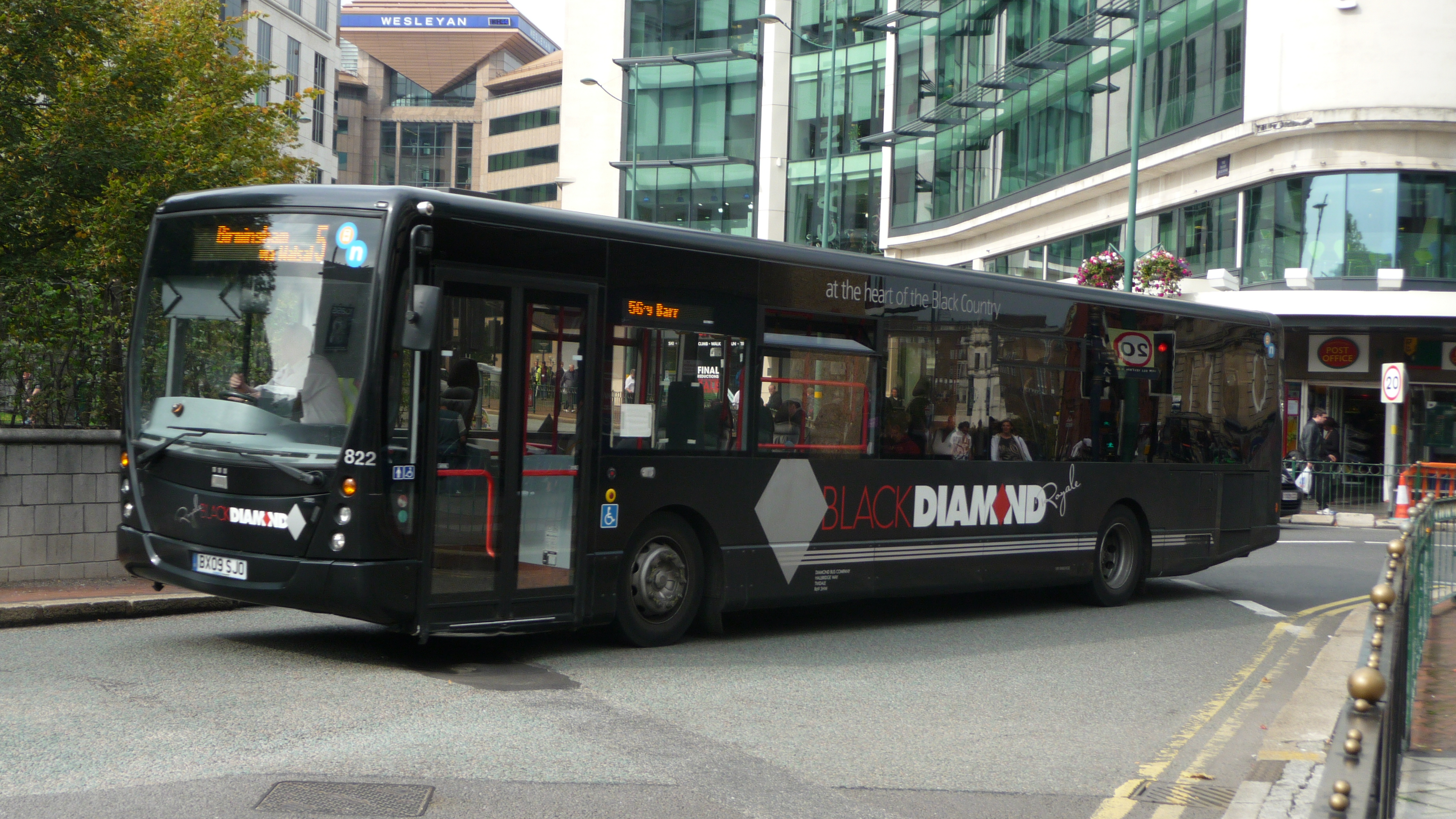
Plaxton Centro bodied Volvo B7RLE in Black Diamond livery in September 2010

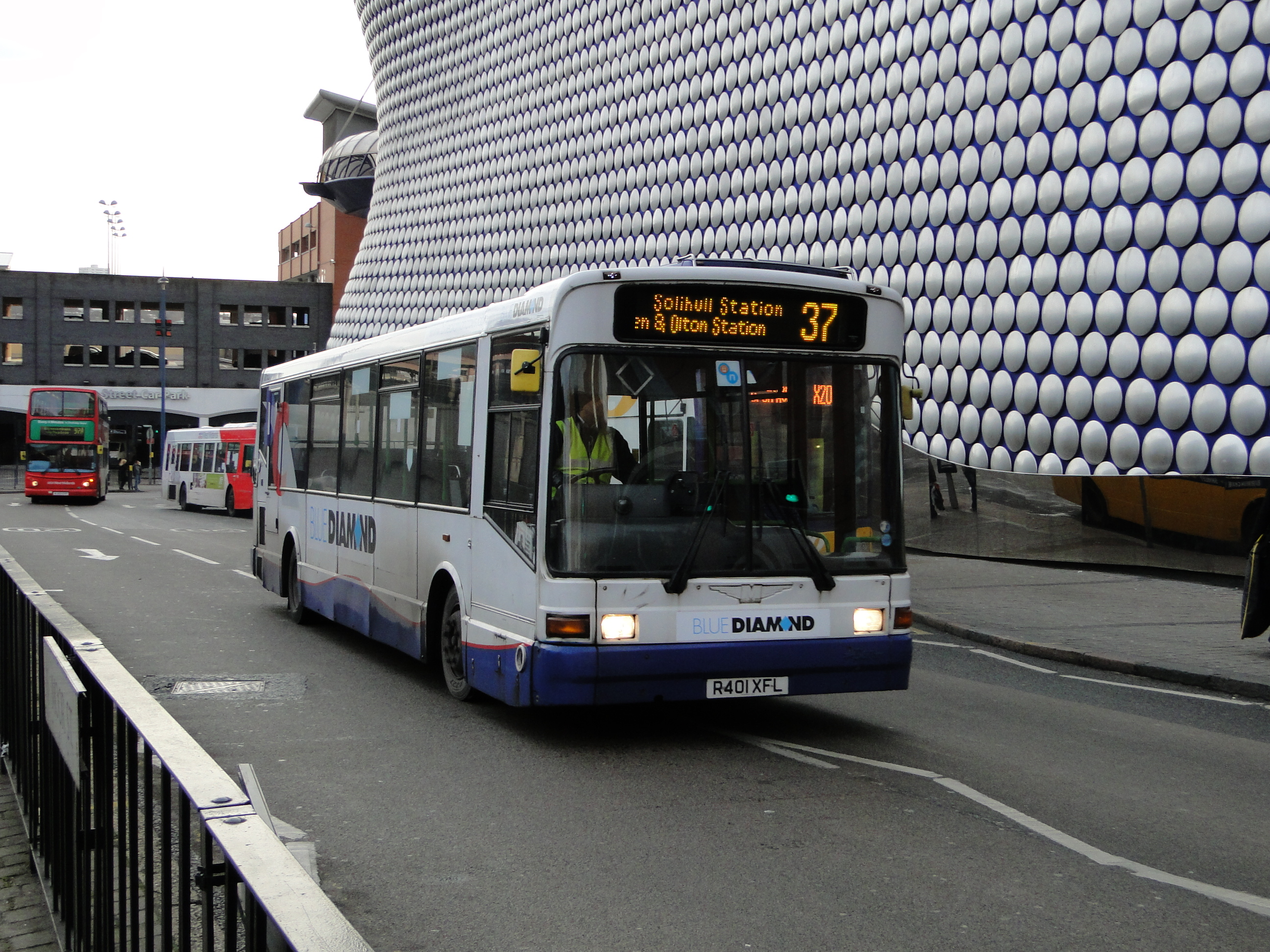
Marshall Capital bodied Dennis Dart SLF in Blue Diamond livery in September 2010

In 2008, upon takeover by Rotala, Diamond started to "localise" their operations. In the Black Country, this meant that the brand became Black Diamond with 20 new Plaxton Centros (eight of which moved to Wessex Bus due to service cuts). These were new for routes 401, 402, 404, 404E and 404H.

In 2009, Diamond launched eight more Plaxton Centro buses on route 9, these using Royale Black Diamond branding. Route 202 Halesowen - Bromsgrove and 4H Hayley Green - West Bromwich used Royale Black Diamond buses.

Most of the routes these buses were new for have since either had new buses (404E), withdrawn (404/H) or had older stock transferred to them (401/2).

In October 2010, Diamond bus branded 10 MCV Evolution bodied MAN 14.240s for the 404 Walsall – West Bromwich service under the branding Black Country Connection, the service operates every 6 to 8 minutes. These buses displaced the Black Diamond branded buses of which 2 were transferred to Wessex Bus and the rest have been cascaded to other routes.

On 23 April 2017, the Wednesfield operations of Arriva Midlands were purchased with nine vehicles.

On 28 July 2017, the business of Hanson's Local Buses, which operated services in Stourbridge, Dudley and surrounding areas, was purchased. Hanson's Local Buses was formed in the 1980s by Margaret Hanson as a coach operator. Following deregulation of the bus industry in 1986, Hansons diversified into operating bus services.

=== Blue Diamond ===
Blue Diamond was formed from the merger of Zak's Buses, North Birmingham Busways and Birmingham Motor Traction. In January 2008 Ludlows, Halesowen was purchased. Originally branded Central Connect, in November 2011 it was rebranded as Blue Diamond.

Blue Diamond, Red Diamond and Black Diamond branding have since been replaced by the simpler Diamond fleetname.

=== Signature ===
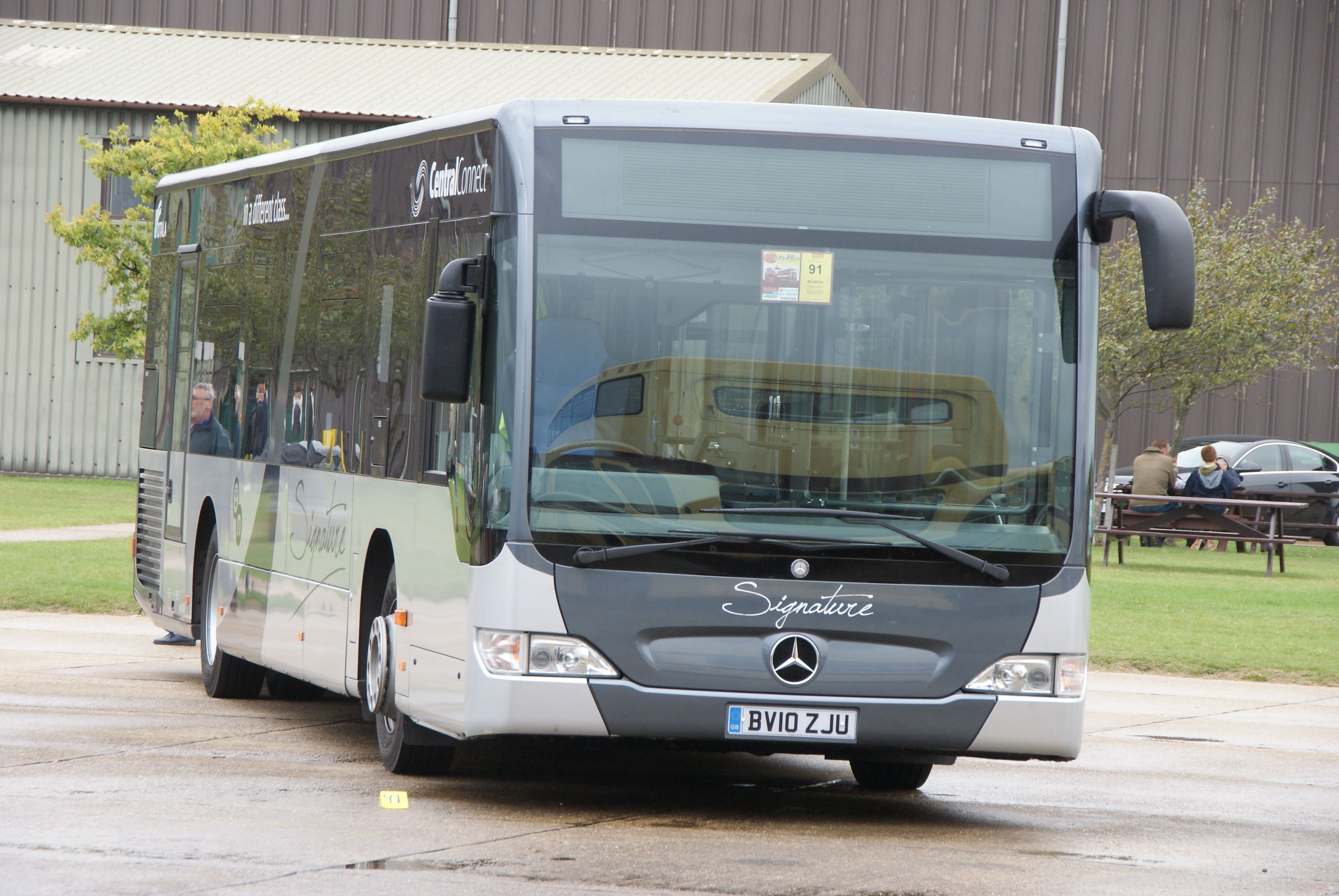
Mercedes-Benz Citaro in Signature livery in September 2010

On 7 June 2010, Central Connect launched the Signature brand with two Solihull routes that were taken over from National Express West Midlands, the S2 (S2/S2A/S2C) and S3 were operated with Optare Solo SRs with leather seating and on-board WiFi.

On 26 July 2010, the Signature brand took over route 82 from National Express Coventry but following a more direct route between Solihull and Coventry using Mercedes-Benz Citaros and service S4 (taken over from Grosvenor) using MCV Evolutions, again both feature leather seating and free on-board WiFi. In 2019, service 82 was lost to Johnson's of Henley-in-Arden who subsequently linked the service to their existing service X20 providing a direct service between Coventry, Solihull and Stratford-upon-Avon.

On 27 March 2011, the Signature brand expanded again with the addition of route 30 Solihull-Acocks Green which was withdrawn by National Express West Midlands. This route is now operated by LandFlight as the A12.

When Central Connect was rebranded as 'Blue Diamond' in late 2011, the Solihull Signature brand was retained. Following loss of many contracts and reorganisation of bus routes in the Solihull area, the Signature brand was dropped in 2019.

== Diamond Worcestershire ==
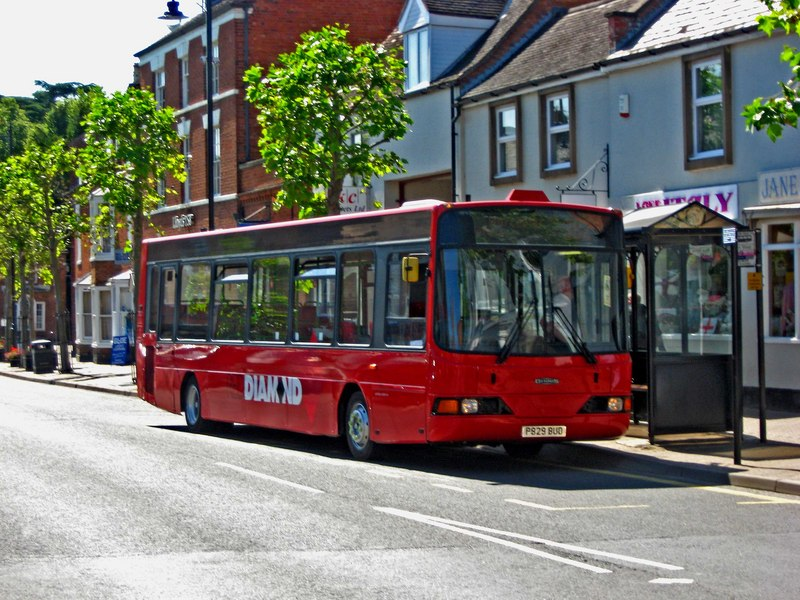
Wright Crusader bodied Dennis Dart SLF in Pershore in June 2010

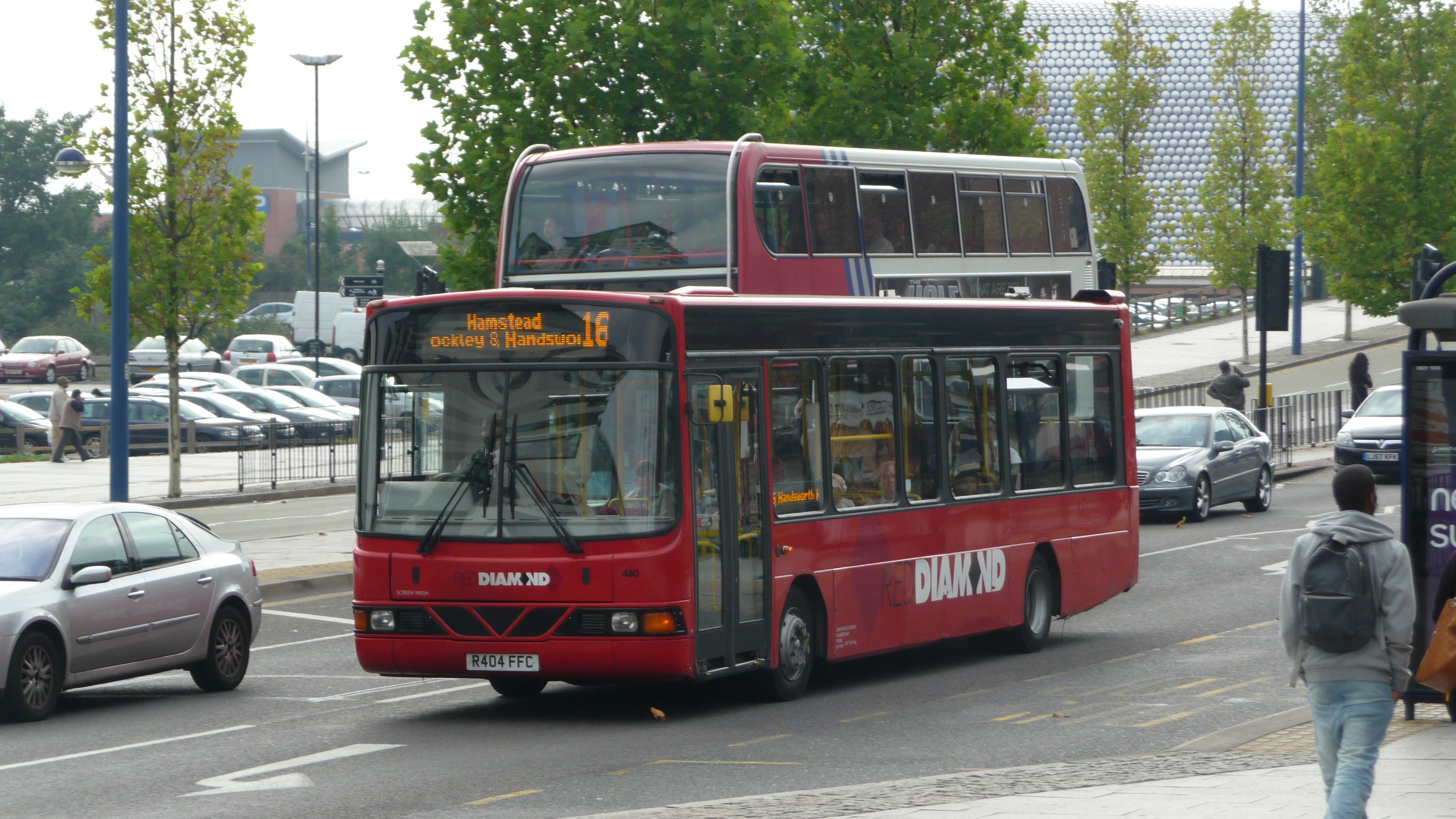
Wright Crusader bodied Dennis Dart SLF in Birmingham in September 2010

In early 2013, Red Diamond was rebranded as Diamond Worcestershire. As part of a working partnership with Worcestershire County Council, a new fleet of Red Diamond bus services were introduced to operate in Redditch. These buses are mainly Diamond-owned Wright Eclipse bodied Volvo B7RLEs but there have been several repainted Dennis Darts in operation.

From 22 January 2007, Diamond were forced to withdraw their evening services on routes 57 and 58 in Redditch, which were under contract to Worcestershire County Council, due to persistent vandalism and violence on the routes. The company told the council that they would no longer risk operating in the evenings. A month later on 25 February 2007, Diamond also withdrew the evening services on route 246 between Redditch and Evesham due to low passenger numbers.

On 8 June 2008, the company introduced 57A and 58A journeys alongside their existing 57 and 58 routes, the new journeys would serve the Alexandra Hospital, after First Midland Red withdrew links to the hospital.

The operations in Redditch were rebranded as Red Diamond in July 2008 to coincide with the launch of six new buses, with a livery designed to be similar to what was used on Midland Red buses. By September 2008, a further six new buses were in operation, along with 10 older buses in the new livery.

From 31 August 2008, Diamond Bus stepped up their operation of commercial and non-commercial services in Redditch significantly, to the point where they operated more buses in Redditch than main rival First Midland Red.

In February 2009, Red Diamond won Worcestershire County Council contracts to operate a number of services around Droitwich and Redditch starting in April 2009. Droitwich residents were unhappy about the changes, showing concern about losing the known and respected drivers from the local routes, however, Diamond Bus entered into an agreement with the former operator of the routes, allowing them to continue operating with the same drivers, while Diamond Bus provide the buses and uniforms.

In 2010, amid much criticism of the poor performance of the existing buses from Worcestershire County Council and passengers, Diamond brought nine MCV Evolutions for services 362, 363 and 382.

In January 2013, Red Diamond purchased First Midlands's Kidderminster and Redditch depots and re-branded the operations as Diamond Worcestershire.

== Acquisitions ==
After Rotala purchased Diamond Bus in 2008, the Diamond Bus operation was expanded to include the operations of four companies operating in the same region which were already owned by Rotala. It took many of the Arriva Midland routes such as 36 Walsall to Alumwell and 28E from Wolverhampton to Willenhall in April 2017.

=== Birmingham Motor Traction ===
Birmingham Motor Traction operated a number of services in Birmingham with a varied fleet of buses, mostly Dennis Darts in a dark blue and white livery, although many buses ran in dealer all-white. They operated a number of services under contract to the West Midlands Passenger Transport Executive. It was purchased by Rotala in 2007.

=== Central Buses ===
Central Buses was a bus company based in Birmingham, England. In February 2018, Central Buses was purchased by Rotala, with its 23 services and 31 buses merged into Diamond. Operations of Central Buses ceased at the conclusion of services on 24 February 2018.

=== Hanson's ===
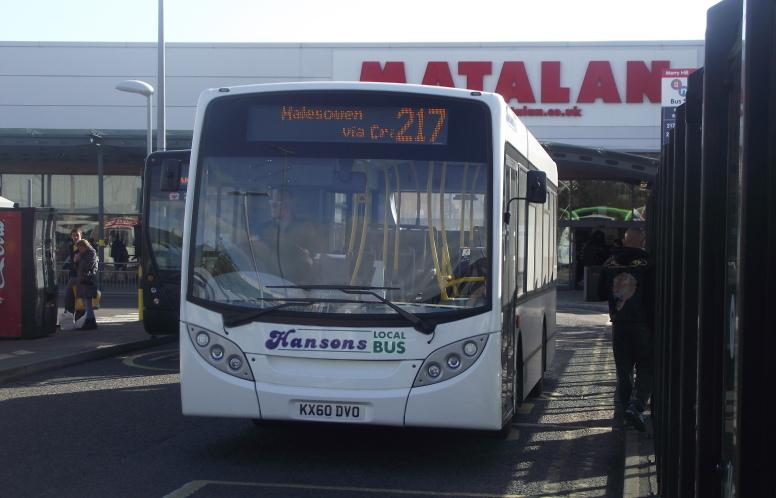
A Hansons ADL Enviro200 in Merry Hill in the white version of the Hansons livery

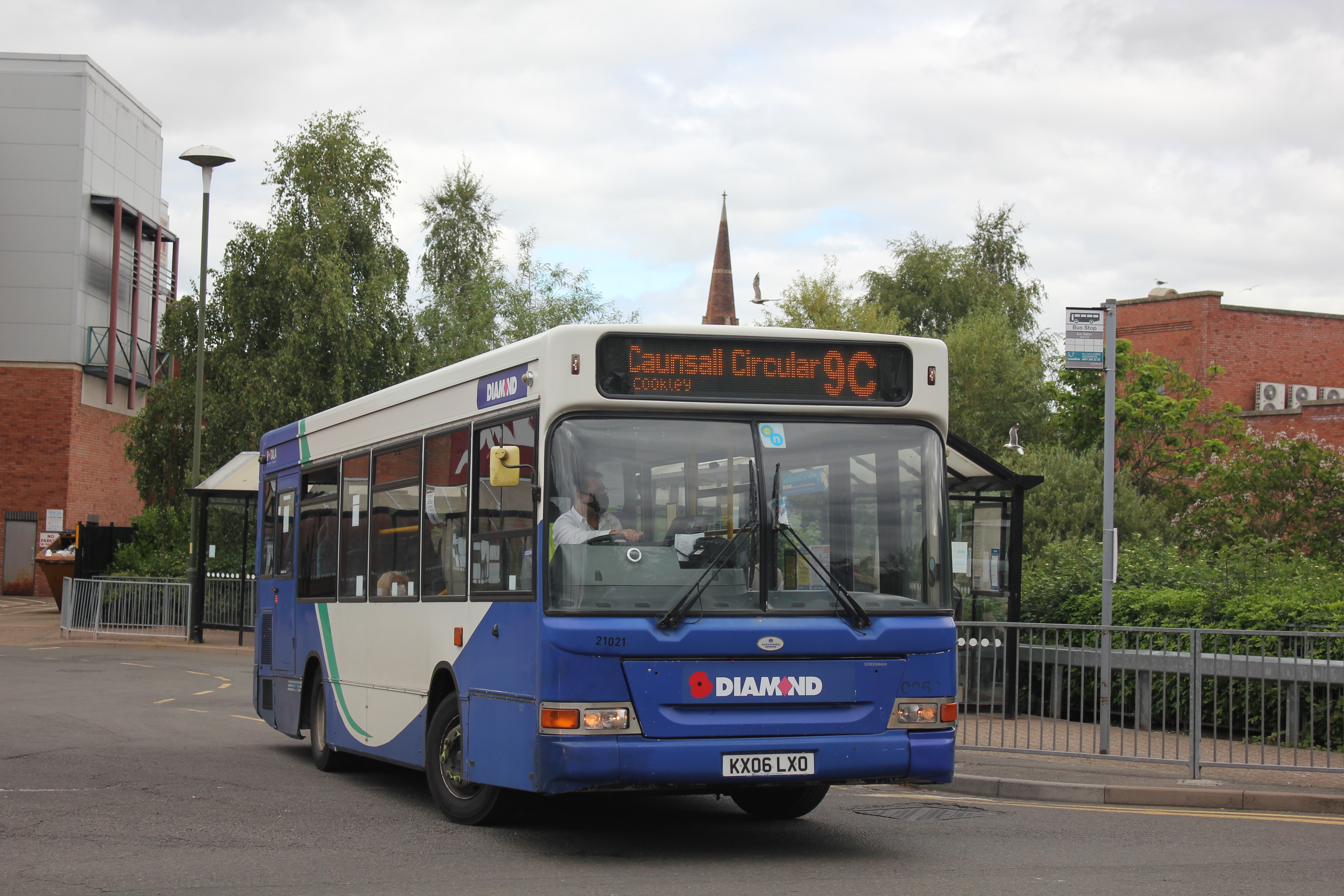
Diamond Buses Alexander Dennis Pointer 2 in Hansons livery in August 2020

Hanson's was a family-owned bus company operating services in the West Midlands and Worcestershire. Hanson's Local Buses was formed in the 1980s by Margaret Hanson as a coach operator. Following deregulation of the bus industry in 1986, Hanson's diversified into operating bus services. In July 2017, Hanson's was purchased by Rotala.

=== Ludlows ===
Ludlows operated a number of services in Halesowen. It operated a varied fleet of around 20 white buses, all of which were low-floor. Ludlows was purchased by Rotala in 2007.

In January 2009, Diamond announced that the Ludlows operation was to be integrated with the Diamond operations, with all routes and vehicles moving to the Tividale depot and running under the Diamond brand.

=== North Birmingham Busways ===
North Birmingham Busways was a small bus operator established in the mid-1990s, and based near Erdington. Its services operated throughout North Birmingham, using, in the main, a distinctive livery of green and cream. In addition to bus services, the company also offered PCV training.

On 18 June 2007, North Birmingham Busways was purchased by Rotala. On 20 August 2007, the bus services and vehicles were transferred to Rotala's Central Connect subsidiary.

=== Zak's ===
Zak's Bus and Coach Services was founded in Great Barr by Kevin Fazakarley in 1978. In October 2006, the business was purchased by Rotala subsidiary Flights Hallmark, and although the original plan was to transfer the assets and operations to Flights Hallmark, contract issues necessitated the continuation of the Zak's legal entity, the company being renamed Central Connect Limited in April 2007.

Rotala relocated the operation to Flights Hallmark's Aston depot, merging with an existing West Midlands Passenger Transport Executive contracted service previously awarded to Flights. The Aston depot has since closed with all operations being moved to other Diamond Bus depots across the West Midlands.

=== Claribel Coaches ===
In January 2022, the purchase of Claribel Coaches of Birmingham was announced, allowing the current owners to focus on the associated Birmingham International Coaches business. Diamond confirmed that the Claribels name would not be retained and all services and buses would be operated under the Diamond Bus name from April 2022. A number of routes, however, were transferred to National Express West Midlands due to the expiration of the tenders operated on behalf of TfWM.

=== Johnsons Excelbus ===
In April 2022, the bus operations of Johnsons Coaches, which operated under the Excelbus brand, were purchased. All bus operations operated under the Diamond Bus brand from 29 May 2022 from Redditch depot. The private hire and coach operations were not included in the deal and continue to trade as Johnsons Coaches. Some Johnsons routes were started early "to assist Johnsons with some of their current operational difficulties".

Following loss of contracts in September 2022, a number of services operated by Johnsons were lost to other operators, chiefly Stagecoach.
