= Walter Somers =

English businessman (1839–1917)

Walter Somers (1839 – 1917) was an English engineer and businessman who established a forge company, later known as Walter Somers Limited, producing a range of steel products including items for military use by the British Admiralty during World War I.

In 1866 Somers was given a loan of £100 by his father and took on a short lease on an ironworks complex at Mucklow Hill, Halesowen, establishing a forgemaster business. Initially focused on production of chains and anchors, the business later also produced axles and railway buffers. By the 1890s, it was delivering forgings to Admiralty specifications – a customer relationship that continued throughout World War I. Somers' company also produced parts of the anchors used on the RMS Titanic.

In 1907, Somers bought Belle Vue House on Mucklow Hill, installing electricity in the house. Overhead lines from a generator at Somers' works supplied current for the house until the 1920s, when it connected to public services.

Somers died in 1917, leaving the company under the direction of his two sons, Seth and Frank. Frank Somers was managing director until 1954.

== Legacy ==
Walter Somers Limited was incorporated in 1919. It became embroiled in the Arms-for-Iraq scandal in the 1980s. The business was acquired by the local Folkes Group in the 1990s, and the main Mucklow Hill site operates as Somers Forge Ltd. The subsidiaries Somers Handling and Somers Vehicle Lifts also still trade in the Halesowen area.

Halesowen town centre was regenerated in the 2000s, and the people of the town were given a chance to vote on naming the central pedestrianised area. They chose to name it Somers Square. The family also left legacies of the Somers Sports and Social Club, the Cycling and Athletic Club, the British Legion Club, and the Seth Somers Park on which stands the Halesowen Cricket Club.
