= David Parkes (antiquary) =

English antiquarian

- Born: 21 February 1763; Halesowen, Shropshire
- Died: 8 May 1833 (aged 70); Shrewsbury, Shropshire
- Occupation: Schoolmaster
- Known for: Antiquarian

David Parkes (21 February 1763 – 8 May 1833) was an English antiquarian.

== Biography ==
Parkes was the son of John Parkes, of an old family in reduced circumstances, was born on 21 February 1763, at Cakemore, near Halesowen, (then in Shropshire, later part of Worcestershire). Parkes, after being educated in the village school, was apprenticed to a japanner at Birmingham, but soon set up a small school, and eventually obtained a situation as usher in a private school. He meanwhile cultivated a natural love of art, and became proficient in French.

Parkes soon removed to Shrewsbury, where he established, in a house called ‘The Franciscan Friars,’ a school for the mercantile classes, which obtained some repute, and subsequently was transferred to larger premises in Castle Street. He spent his leisure in travelling about Shropshire, making innumerable drawings of antiquities and picturesque objects. He thus accumulated an important collection of books, prints, and antiquities connected with Shropshire. Parkes was a frequent contributor to the ‘Gentleman's Magazine,’ and was a well-known and prominent citizen at Shrewsbury.

He died at Shrewsbury on 8 May 1833, and his library and collections were sold in the following August. He married Elizabeth Morris of Hadnall, Shropshire, by whom he had three sons and several daughters. Of his sons, James Parkes (1794–1828), born in 1794, practised as a drawing-master in Shrewsbury and assisted his father in his archæological drawings. He died on 31 March 1828. Twelve etchings by him of views of monastic and other remains in Shropshire were published posthumously in 1829. The younger son, John Parkes (1804–1832), also practised as a drawing-master.

== Bibliography ==
This article incorporates text from a publication now in the public domain: Cust, Lionel Henry (1895). "Parkes, David". In Lee, Sidney (ed.). Dictionary of National Biography. Vol. 43. London: Smith, Elder & Co.
