= Halesowen =

Market town in West Midlands, England

Coordinates: 52.450164°N 2.050935°W

- Town
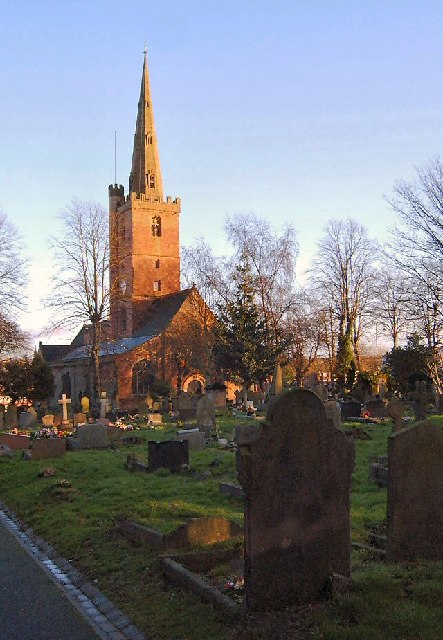
- The Norman-era parish church of St. John the Baptist, Halesowen

- Location within the West Midlands
- Population: 60,110 (2021 census)
- OS grid reference: SO9583
- Metropolitan borough: Dudley
- Metropolitan county: West Midlands
- Region: West Midlands
- Country: England
- Sovereign state: United Kingdom
- Post town: Halesowen
- Postcode district: B62, B63
- Dialling code: 0121; 01384
- Police: West Midlands
- Fire: West Midlands
- Ambulance: West Midlands
- UK Parliament: Halesowen
- Website: Halesowen town centre BID

Halesowen (/heɪlzˈoʊ.ɪn/ haylz-OH-in) is a market town in the Metropolitan Borough of Dudley, in the county of the West Midlands, England.

Historically an exclave of Shropshire and, from 1844, in Worcestershire, the town is around 7 miles (11 km) from Birmingham city centre, and 6 miles (10 km) from Dudley town centre. The population of the Halesowen built-up area at the 2021 census, was 60,110. Halesowen is in the Halesowen parliamentary constituency. It has been represented by Labour MP Alex Ballinger since 4 July 2024.

== Geography and administration ==
Halesowen was a detached part of the county of Shropshire but was incorporated into Worcestershire by the Counties (Detached Parts) Act 1844. Since the local government reorganisation of 1974 it has formed a part of the West Midlands Metropolitan county and Conurbation, in the Dudley Metropolitan Borough, which it joined at the same time as neighbouring Stourbridge, which had also been in Worcestershire until that point.

Halesowen borders the Birmingham suburbs of Quinton and Bartley Green to the east. To the south is Romsley and Worcestershire, to the north is Cradley Heath and to the west is Stourbridge.

Although predominantly urban or suburban in character, Halesowen borders on green belt land with excellent access to the countryside, for example the Clent Hills. It has extensive road links including Junction 3 of the M5 motorway, which allow easy commuting to Birmingham, other areas of the Black County or nationwide. The centre of Birmingham is approximately 30 minutes away by car and reachable by the number 9 or X10 buses, which are run by West Midlands Bus.

The centre of Halesowen is home to a Norman church, a football ground (where non-league Halesowen Town play) and Halesowen College which was founded in 1966 and with origins dating back to the opening of Halesowen Technical School in 1939.

Most of the housing stock in Halesowen is privately owned and was built in the 30 years which followed the end of the Second World War, although some parts of the town are still made up of Victorian and Edwardian terraced houses. The town centre was extensively rebuilt during the 1960s and 1970s.

=== Suburbs ===
In 1974, Dudley Metropolitan Borough Council identified six historical suburbs within Halesowen, which they signed accordingly with a series of gateway signs, some of which were still there as recently as the early 2000s. In addition to the town centre, these are listed below. A separate sign for Illey was added many years later.

- Cradley
- Hasbury
- Hawne
- Hayley Green
- Hill & Cakemore
- Lapal

== Climate ==
As with the rest of the British Isles and West Midlands, Halesowen experiences a maritime climate with cool summers and mild winters. A weather station provides local climate data for the period 1991–2020. Temperature extremes at Halesowen have ranged from −14.5 °C (5.9 °F) 13 December 1981 up to 34.7 °C (94.5 °F) on 3 August 1990. The coldest daily maximum temperature was −6.0 °C (21.2 °F) on 12 January 1987, and the warmest daily minimum was 20.5 °C (68.9 °F) on 5 August 1975.

Records of meteorological variables have been kept since January 1956, in that time the wettest day on record has been 16 June 2016 with a total fall of 75.0 millimetres (2.95 in). In addition, June 2016 is the wettest month of any, with a total fall of 221.2 millimetres (8.71 in). 2014 is the wettest year on record, with a rainfall of 1,186.1 millimetres (46.70 in); 2011, with 540.4 millimetres (21.28 in) is the driest. The most new snow to accumulate on one day was 25.0 centimetres (9.8 in) on 25 February 1981; the snowiest year on record is 1979 with 95.8 centimetres (37.7 in) and the least snowy are 2002 and 2019, both with 0.0 centimetres (0 in).

Climate data for Halesowen 502 feet (153 m), 1991–2020 averages, Extremes 1956–2004
Month	Jan	Feb	Mar	Apr	May	Jun	Jul	Aug	Sep	Oct	Nov	Dec	Year
Record high °C (°F)	14.3 (57.7)	16.8 (62.2)	21.7 (71.1)	25.4 (77.7)	27.5 (81.5)	31.6 (88.9)	32.6 (90.7)	34.7 (94.5)	27.2 (81.0)	26.3 (79.3)	16.9 (62.4)	15.3 (59.5)	34.7 (94.5)
Mean daily maximum °C (°F)	7.2 (45.0)	8.0 (46.4)	10.5 (50.9)	13.8 (56.8)	17.1 (62.8)	19.8 (67.6)	22.0 (71.6)	21.4 (70.5)	18.5 (65.3)	14.2 (57.6)	10.0 (50.0)	7.5 (45.5)	14.2 (57.6)
Daily mean °C (°F)	4.4 (39.9)	4.6 (40.3)	6.6 (43.9)	9.0 (48.2)	12.0 (53.6)	14.9 (58.8)	16.9 (62.4)	16.6 (61.9)	14.1 (57.4)	10.6 (51.1)	7.0 (44.6)	4.7 (40.5)	10.2 (50.4)
Mean daily minimum °C (°F)	1.6 (34.9)	1.3 (34.3)	2.8 (37.0)	4.2 (39.6)	7.0 (44.6)	10.0 (50.0)	11.9 (53.4)	11.8 (53.2)	9.7 (49.5)	7.0 (44.6)	4.0 (39.2)	1.8 (35.2)	6.1 (43.0)
Record low °C (°F)	−13.9 (7.0)	−12.8 (9.0)	−11.1 (12.0)	−5.4 (22.3)	−3.9 (25.0)	−1.1 (30.0)	2.2 (36.0)	2.8 (37.0)	−0.2 (31.6)	−5.0 (23.0)	−6.2 (20.8)	−14.5 (5.9)	−14.5 (5.9)
Average precipitation mm (inches)	66.4 (2.61)	50.9 (2.00)	47.5 (1.87)	58.4 (2.30)	56.6 (2.23)	63.3 (2.49)	56.3 (2.22)	61.9 (2.44)	62.6 (2.46)	80.5 (3.17)	78.4 (3.09)	78.4 (3.09)	761.1 (29.96)
Average precipitation days (≥ 1.0 mm)	12.8	10.3	10.1	10.6	10.0	10.3	10.0	10.3	9.9	12.3	13.1	12.5	132.2
Mean monthly sunshine hours	53.9	77.0	120.5	159.8	200.4	196.5	203.7	180.8	144.6	106.2	65.0	52.9	1,561.4
Source 1: Met Office
Source 2: Starlings Roost Weather

== History ==
Halesowen is recorded in the Domesday Book of 1086 as being larger than Birmingham. The manor and town was known as Hala (from the Anglo-Saxon word halh, meaning 'nook' or 'remote valley'), until it was given by King Henry II to Welsh Prince Dafydd ab Owain in 1177 and became known as Halas Owen. The parish of Halesowen, which incorporated other townships later to become independent parishes, was an exclave of the county of Shropshire, but grew to become a town and was transferred to the jurisdiction of Worcestershire by the Counties (Detached Parts) Act 1844. Included in the boundaries was the ancient village of Brettle. Halesowen appears on censuses and maps into the nineteenth century also as Hales Owen.

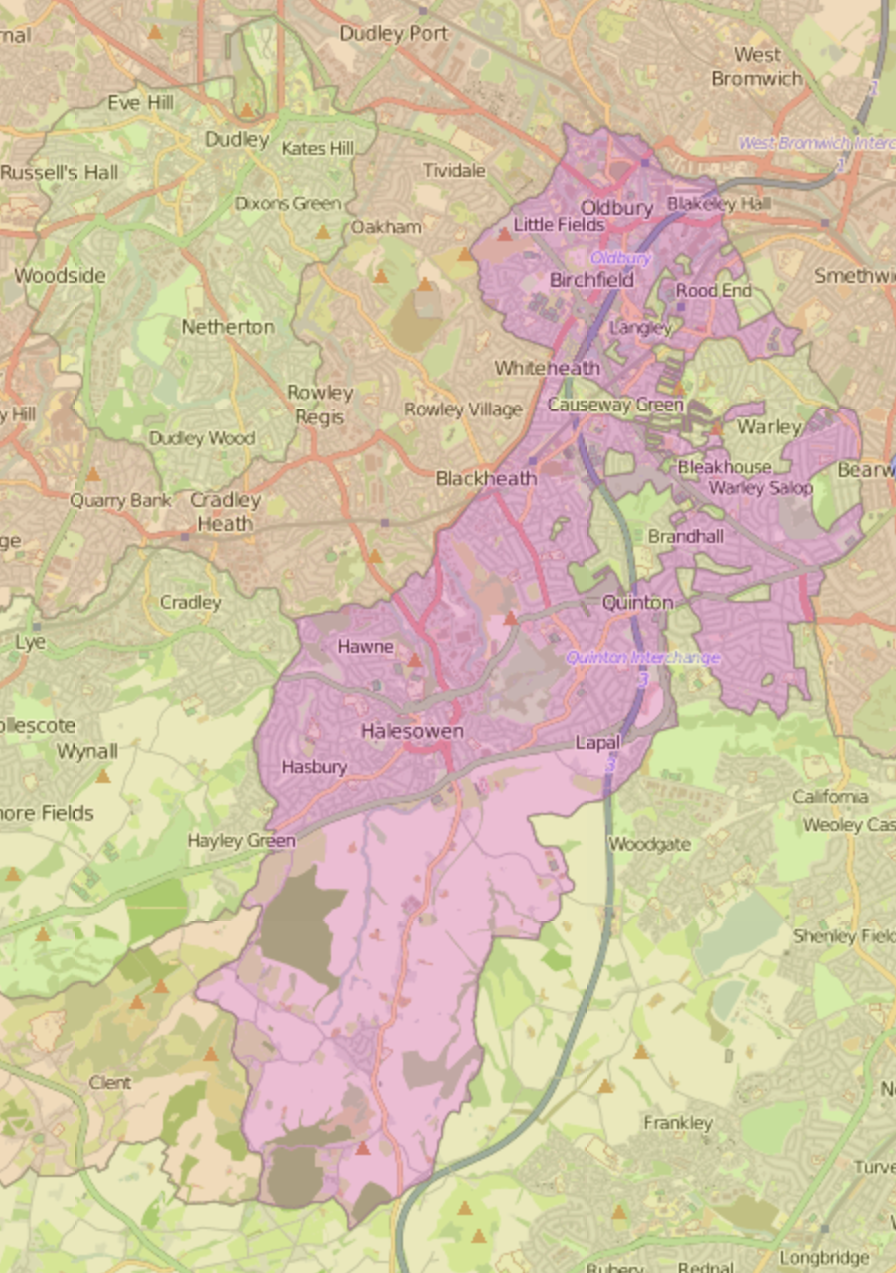
The ancient parish of Halesowen was an exclave of Shropshire. (Historic County Borders Project)

In the 1220s, Halesowen had a market and fair and, by 1270, it had been granted a charter of liberties by its lord, the Premonstratensian Abbey of Halesowen. By 1300, it is estimated that the population was around 600. The court rolls for Halesowen survive from 1272 and show that the majority of migrants to Halesowen in the 14th century were women at 75%. Little was done to remove them and many went on to become small retailers in the area.

The village is well known by medieval historians for the conflict that took place around this time. In 1279, as the Abbot attempted to increase labour services for his tenants (which had been fixed in 1244), the peasants attempted to plead their case in the King's Court, a privilege forbidden to unfree villeins. The Abbot thus fined them £10 which was a large sum at the time, and resistance, led by Roger Ketel, heightened. The conflict was snuffed out in 1282 as Ketel and Alice Edrich (the pregnant wife of another prominent rebel) were murdered by thugs hired by the abbey.

During the 18th century Halesowen developed rapidly as a result of the Industrial Revolution. The manufacture of nails was the staple trade in the town and many mills were used for slitting and iron production. Coal had been mined in the area from at least the reign of Edward I. Dating to 1893, Coombes Wood was the largest colliery in the town; at its peak in 1919 Halesowen had 130 working mines.

During the French Revolutionary War Halesowen raised a troop of volunteer cavalry by 1798, which in 1814 became part of the South Shropshire Yeomanry Cavalry.

Halesowen became the centre of a poor law union in the 19th century, which later became established as a rural sanitary district and later the Halesowen Rural District in 1894. Oldbury was included into the area of Halesowen under the Halesowen Inclosure Act 1829 (10 Geo. 4. c. 25 Pr.). With increasing urbanisation of the area, in the early 20th century, it became the Halesowen Urban District in 1925, and obtained a grant of charter to become a municipal borough in 1936. In 1974, under the Local Government Act 1972, Halesowen was incorporated into the new Dudley Metropolitan Borough, in the Metropolitan county of the West Midlands.

Halesowen was once served by a railway line – in reality two lines which met at an end-on junction at the station. The first was a branch of the Great Western Railway from Old Hill to Halesowen, opened in 1878, followed in 1883 by a section jointly owned by the Great Western and the Midland Railway (though worked mostly by the latter), linking the town with Northfield on the Midland Railway's Birmingham to Bristol main line, with intermediate stations at Rubery, Hunnington, and a workmen's halt at Longbridge serving the car factories (not to be confused with the present Longbridge station). Being largely rural in character, the line failed to attract much traffic and regular passenger services ended between Halesowen and Northfield as far back as 1919, and between Old Hill and Halesowen in 1927, though the workmen's trains continued to serve Longbridge until 1960. The line is now lifted, but the track-bed can be seen close to the town, although there is no sign of the station. The goods shed remained until recently, serving as an industrial unit though it has now been demolished.

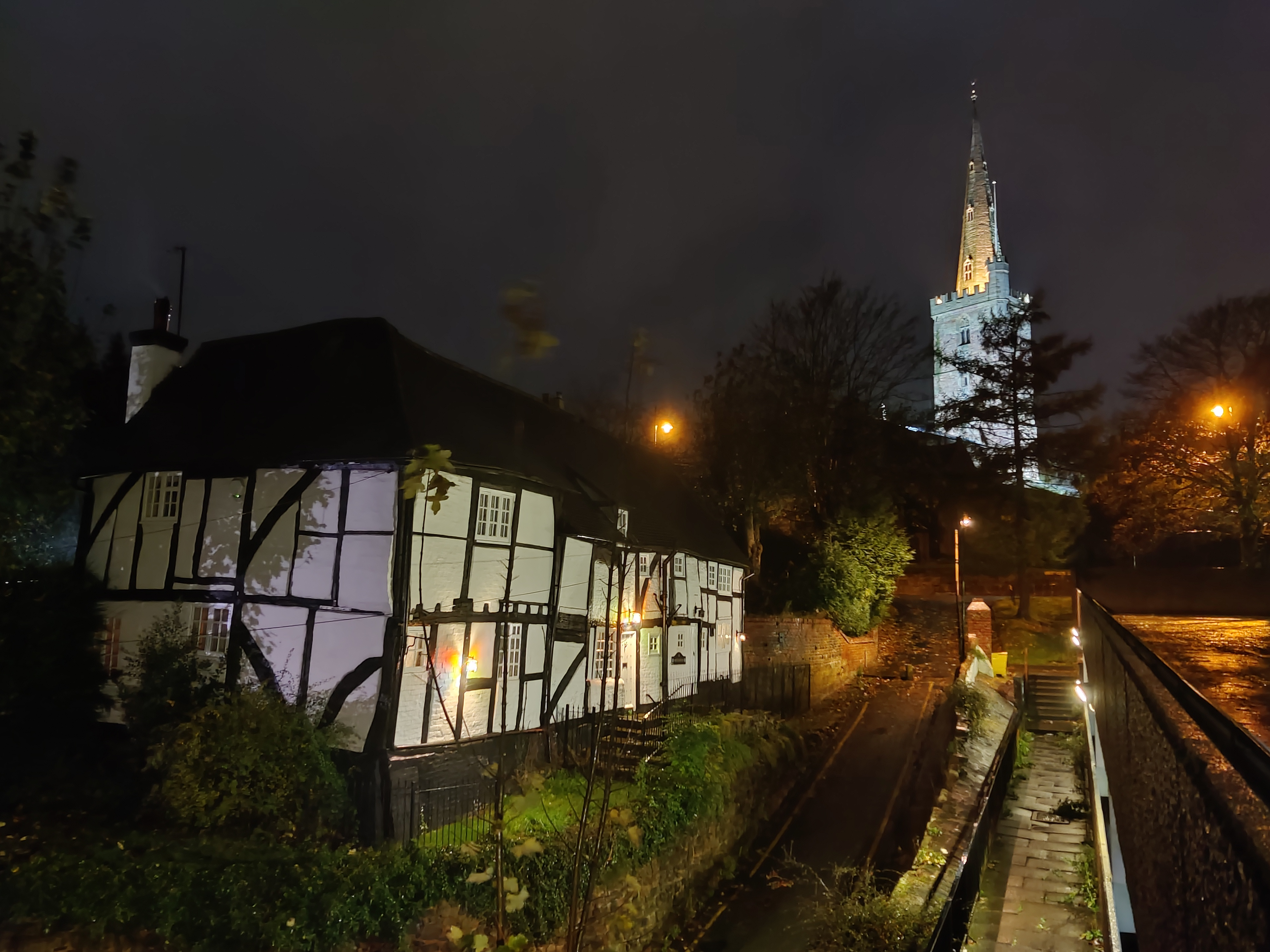
16th-century Whitefriars, now grade II listed, was one of the few older buildings to survive the 1960s redevelopment.

In the 1960s, the town centre underwent vast redevelopment which saw most of the older buildings demolished. The high street was pedestrianised and a shopping precinct (called "the Precinct") was developed, housing many new retail units as well as a new public library. The centre was refurbished in the late 1980s and placed under cover, being renamed the Cornbow Centre at this time.

Trade in the town centre declined between 1985 and 1990 as the Merry Hill Shopping Centre some 5 miles (8 km) away at Brierley Hill was developed, although not as severely as it declined in Stourbridge and in particular Dudley. The only high-profile casualty was the J Sainsbury supermarket, which closed in 1992 due to the popularity of the store which had opened at Merry Hill three years earlier to succeed the Dudley store – combined with the onset of the recession at the start of the 1990s.

A further upgrading of the town centre took place in 2007 and 2008, with part of the Cornbow Centre (including a petrol station and several smaller retail units) being demolished to make way for a new Asda superstore which opened on 24 November 2008. The bus station was also rebuilt. This 18-month £30 million project was completed in December 2008 and the town received a commendation for the work by the Retail Property Organisation.

== Landmarks ==
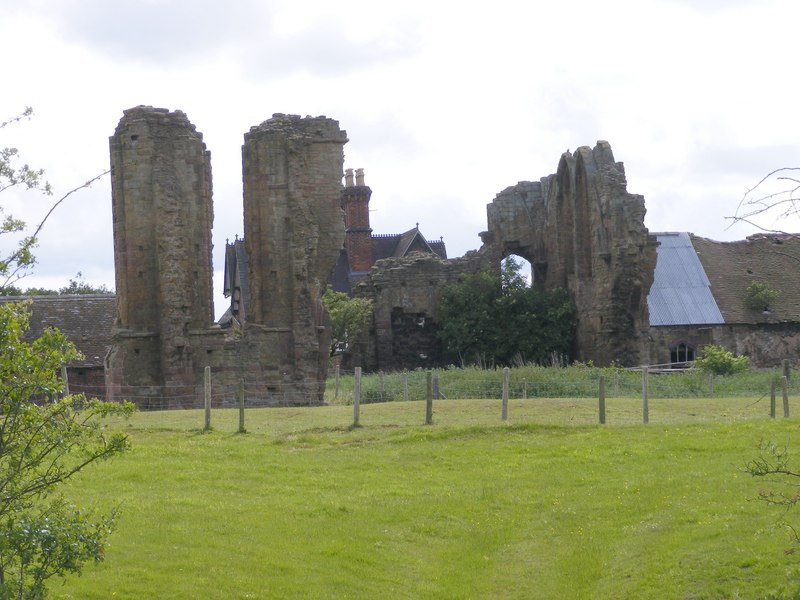
The ruins of Halesowen Abbey

In the eastern part of Halesowen is Leasowes Park, which is considered to be one of the first natural landscape gardens in England. The 18th-century poet William Shenstone designed the garden, beginning works in 1743 and continuing until his death in 1763, transforming existing farmland he had inherited after his parents' death. Today, the parkland is grade one listed, as it is of national importance. The local theatre and a Wetherspoon's public house are both named after William Shenstone as are at least two roads in the locality.

The Parish Church of St John the Baptist was founded by Roger de Montgomery and stands on the site of an even earlier Anglo-Saxon church. Several extensions have been made including the outer south aisle which was added in 1883 by John Oldrid Scott although there is still much evidence of the original Norman work. A Medieval cross stands in the churchyard, having previously stood in Great Cornbow until it was blown down by a gale in 1908.

Nearby are the ruins of Halesowen Abbey, founded in 1215 by Peter des Roches, Bishop of Winchester. The dissolution of the monasteries saw the abbey pass into private hands in 1538. The abbey was the subject of an archaeological evaluation by Birmingham Archaeology and is now owned and managed by English Heritage.

Most of the town centre was rebuilt in the 1960s to create a modern shopping area that incorporated a new library as well as many supermarkets and shops centred around the Cornbow Centre. This was refurbished in the late 1980s to create a covered shopping area.

In 2007–08, Halesowen underwent a £30 million regeneration of part of its town centre, which has included the construction of a new Asda supermarket located in the Cornbow Centre, together with a new multi-storey car park, a rebuilt bus station and improvements to the road layout.

== Economy ==
The principal industry of Halesowen was traditionally nail making, an industry that was performed on a small scale individually in the backyards of a large number of nail makers. Halesowen also had, along with most other areas of the Black Country, a large number of above and underground coal mines. In more recent years, the arrival of a junction of the motorway network allowed Halesowen to attract a number of large organisations to the town.

Sandvik's UK headquarters are located here as well as Somers Forge, SomersTotalKare, The Mucklow Group. and Mapei UK's headquarters.

Communicourt are the leading providers of non-registered intermediaries to the criminal and family courts and its headquarters are in Halesowen.

== Transport ==
Transport in the town is overseen by Transport for West Midlands, the county's transport authority. Halesowen, as mentioned above, is no longer served by a railway station. It is however served by a fairly comprehensive bus network, and is on the Hagley Road Bus Corridor from Birmingham to Stourbridge (route 9), the Merry Hill Shopping Centre (route 002, 13, 17H, 24H, 142/142A, and X10), Dudley (route 14A and 19), Bromsgrove (route 147, 202) and Kidderminster (route 192). Service 4H operates from Hayley Green to Walsall via Blackheath and West Bromwich. Halesowen bus station is located on Queensway, next to the Asda supermarket and Jobcentre Plus. Most services are operated by West Midlands Bus, Diamond Bus and Kev's Cars and Coaches.

Halesowen is considered one of the largest towns in the United Kingdom without a railway station. The nearest railway stations are Rowley Regis, Stourbridge Junction, Cradley Heath and Old Hill.

== Education ==
There are currently 15 primary schools and 3 secondary schools situated within the district of Halesowen. There is also one special needs school, Halesbury Special School, and a further education college, Halesowen College.

The secondary schools are Windsor High School, Leasowes High School and Earls High School. Windsor High School offers sixth form education.

The primary schools are:

- Caslon Primary School
- Colley Lane Primary School
- Cradley Church of England Primary School
- Halesowen Church of England Primary School
- Hasbury Church of England Primary School
- Howley Grange Primary School
- Huntingtree Primary School
- Hurst Green Primary School
- Lapal Primary School
- Lutley Primary School
- Manor Way Primary School
- Newfield Park Primary School
- Olive Hill Primary Academy
- Our Lady and St. Kenelm Roman Catholic Primary School
- Tenterfields Primary School

Newfield Park Primary School was built during the 1960s to serve the expanding local area of Hawne.

In 1972, when still a borough in its own right, Halesowen Council abolished the traditional infant and junior schools and replaced them with first schools for ages 5 to 9 and middle schools for the 9 to 13 age group, but this system was abolished in 1982 and reverted to the previous infant schools for 5 to 7 year olds and junior schools for ages 7 to 11. It was one of the first instances of three-tier education being abolished in favour of a return to traditional age ranges, though most areas which adopted the system have since reverted to the traditional age ranges.

The rest of the Dudley Metropolitan Borough consisted of 5–8 first and 8–12 middle schools (barring Stourbridge and Kingswinford, which had both retained the traditional 5–7 infant and 7–11 junior schools) until following the suit of Halesowen and reverting to the traditional ranges in 1990.

Former schools in the town include Richmond Boys School and Walton Girls School, which were merged in September 1983 to form Windsor High School, a mixed 11-16 comprehensive school based at an expanded Richmond site. The Walton site was annexed into Halesowen College until it was sold off for a housing development 18 years later.

== Media ==
Local news and television programmes are provided by BBC West Midlands and ITV Central. Television signals are received from Sutton Coldfield transmitting station and local relay transmitters.

Halesowen is served by local editions of two regional evening papers, the Birmingham-based Evening Mail and the Wolverhampton-based Express & Star.

There are two local free weekly newspapers delivered to every household in Halesowen, The Halesowen News and The Halesowen Chronicle.

The Halesowen area is served by the following local and regional radio stations:

- BBC Radio WM: local FM station broadcasting local news, sport and music from the BBC studios at the Mailbox in Birmingham
- Hits Radio: local FM commercial CHR music station for Birmingham and the Black Country and Shropshire broadcast from studios in Birmingham and Manchester
- Heart West Midlands: regional FM commercial Hot AC music station broadcast from studios in Birmingham and London
- Smooth Radio West Midlands: regional FM adult contemporary commercial music station broadcast from studios in Birmingham and London
- Capital Midlands: local FM commercial contemporary hit music station for Birmingham broadcast from studios in Birmingham and London
- Black Country Radio: local FM community station broadcast from studios in Stourbridge
- Greatest Hits West Midlands: regional FM station broadcasting music from across the decades from studios in Birmingham, Liverpool, Manchester and London
- Radio XL: regional AM Asian station broadcast from studios in Birmingham
- BBC Asian Network: national digital Asian station available on AM in the West Midlands
- Radio Halesowen Town: covering all Halesowen Town FC matches live, plus covering all over local sports and community events.

== Sport and leisure ==
Halesowen has a rugby union club called Old Halesonians and a hockey club also named Old Halesonians.

Halesowen Town F.C. are the town's non-league football club and play their home matches at The Grove on Old Hawne Lane. They currently play in the Southern League Premier Central, which is in the seventh tier of English football.

Halesowen Cricket Club are based at Seth Somers Park just off the A456 Manor Way. The club operates four teams competing in the Birmingham and District Premier League and the Worcestershire County League.

The Manor Abbey Sports Ground on Manor Way is the home of Halesowen Athletics & Cycling Club. Facilities include a 400 metres outdoor cycling velodrome and a four lane 350 metres athletics track. The grounds also include a weights room, indoor training room and clubhouse. Halesowen Tennis Club is also based at the Manor Abbey Sports Ground with four floodlit, artificial clay courts available for use by members.

Halesowen Leisure Centre on Pool Road includes a swimming pool and gym and is used by a number of local clubs, including Halesowen Swimming Club, Halesowen Triathlon Club and Cobra Running and Triathlon Club.

== Notable residents ==
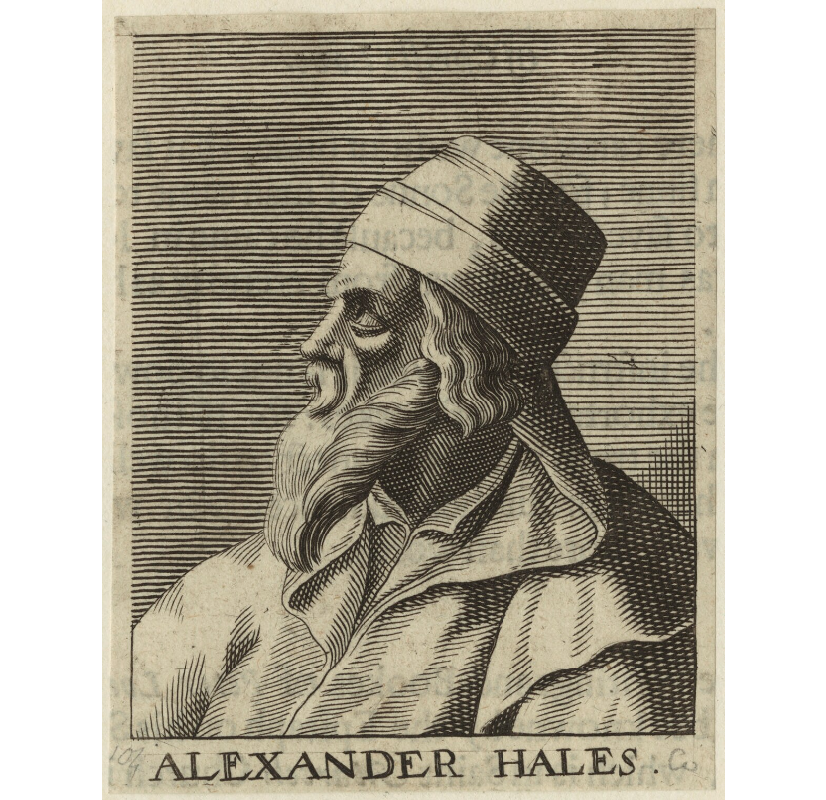
Alexander of Hales, line drawing 1660

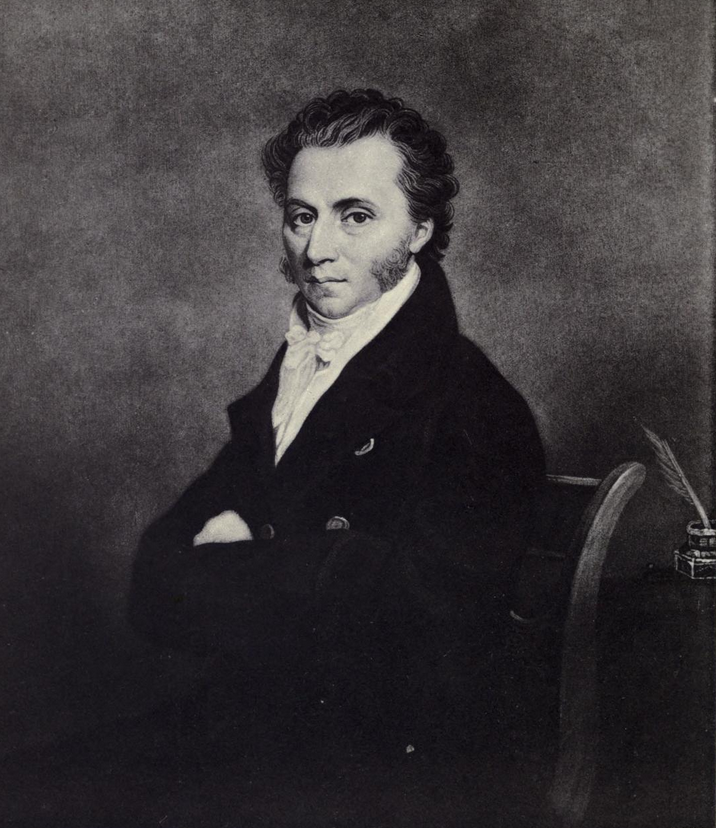
Thomas Attwood, 1832

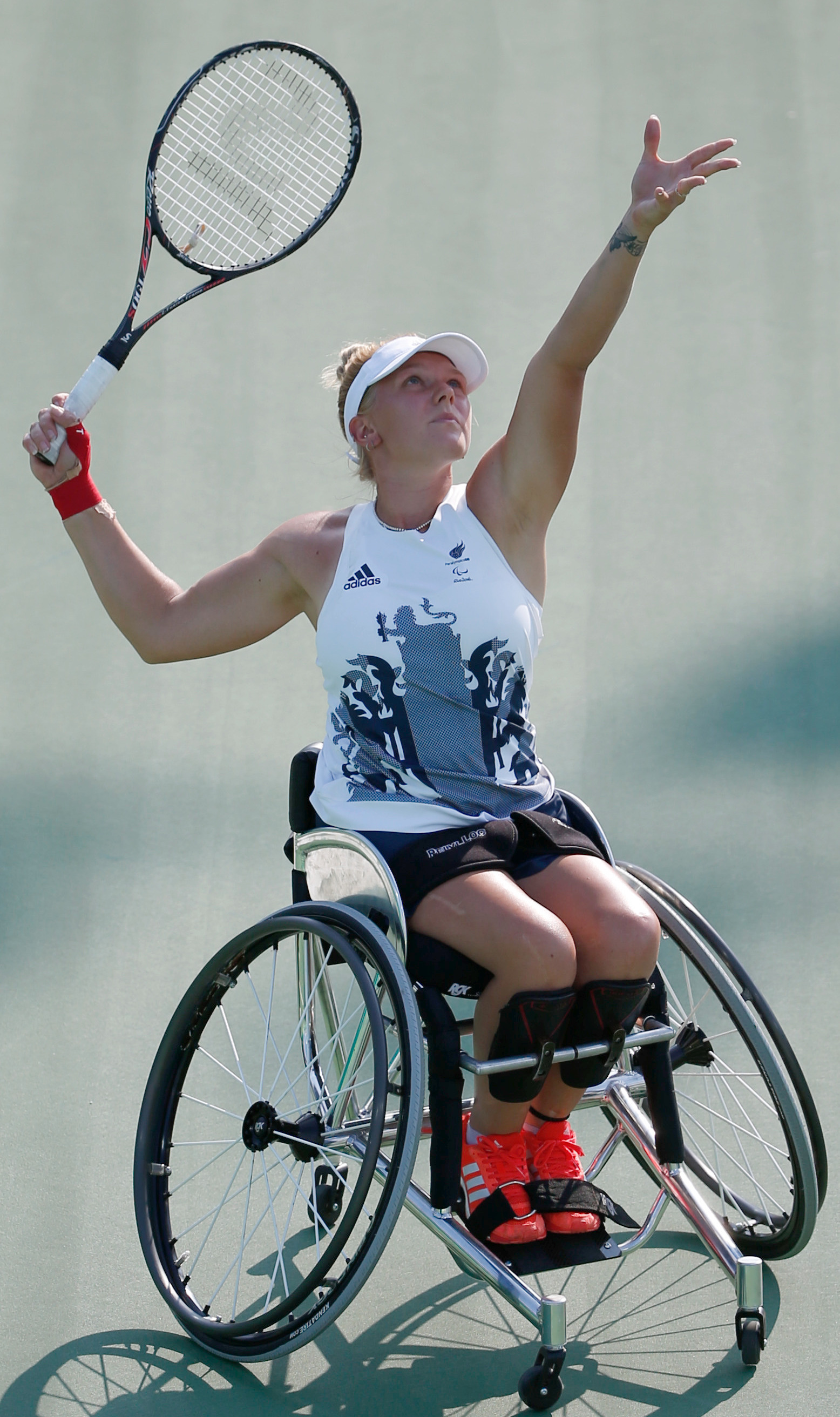
Jordanne Whiley, Rio Paralympics 2016

- Alexander of Hales (c. 1185–1245), English theologian and philosopher
- Adam Littleton (1627–1694), English cleric and lexicographer
- William Shenstone (1714–1763), poet and landscape gardener
- Amos Green (1735–1807), British painter
- David Parkes (1763-1833), antiquary and artist
- Thomas Attwood (1783–1856), banker, economist, political campaigner and MP
- Sir William James Moore (1828–1896), Surgeon-General and Honorary Physician to Queen Victoria
- Sir Benjamin Hingley, 1st Baronet (1830–1905), Liberal MP for North Worcestershire
- Walter Somers (1839–1917), engineer and ironmaster
- Francis Brett Young (1884–1954), novelist, poet, playwright, composer, doctor and soldier
- Dolly Allen (1906–1990), comedian, singer and performer; grew up locally
- Richard Wordsworth (1915–1993), character actor
- Bill Oddie (1941–2026), one of The Goodies, actor, birder, comedian, conservationist, musician and television presenter
- Glenn Tipton (born 1947), one of the lead guitarists for the heavy metal band Judas Priest
- Robert Plant (born 1948), rock singer; member of Led Zeppelin from 1968 to 1980
- Frank Skinner (born 1957), comedian and television presenter
- Julian Smith (born 1969), saxophonist
- Philip Tibbetts (born c.1970), HM March Pursuivant Extraordinary - The Court of the Lord Lyon (2021–)

=== Sport ===
- Les Roberts (1901–1980), footballer who played 306 games, including 106 for Swindon Town
- Eddie Lowe (1925–2009), footballer who played 586 games, including 104 for Aston Villa and 473 for Fulham
- Les Smith (1927–2008), footballer who played 203 games including 85 for Wolves and 115 for Aston Villa
- Rex Williams (born 1933), professional billiards and snooker player
- Lee Sharpe (born 1971), footballer who played 345 games, including 193 for Manchester United and 8 for England
- Jordanne Whiley (born 1992), wheelchair tennis player
- Morgan Rogers (born 2002), footballer
