= Office of International Treasury Control =

The Office of International Treasury Control (OITC) is an organization that falsely claims to be associated with the United Nations (UN) and the Federal Reserve, the central bank of the United States. It—and people claiming to act on its authority—has attempted to deceive people and organizations in Ecuador, Fiji, and the United Kingdom. The UN and Federal Reserve have denied any knowledge of or connection with OITC.

== The OITC's status ==
The OITC claims to be "an international institution registered under the United Nations (under UN Charter Control No: 10-60847) with substantial assets in its control". OITC spokesmen have claimed that the organization has been chartered by the United Nations under a secret protocol and that "until today [it has been] a secret organization known by some particularly in the highest levels of banking". The OITC claims that it was established by "Governments of the World of Legal Decadency".

However, it has consistently declined to publish any independent verification of its status, claiming that only individuals with a "level 3" or "level 5" security classification can see its "protocol for verification". No context or jurisdiction is given for which these "levels" apply. According to an OITC spokesman, "the protocol for verification can only be undertaken by a senior member of the Government or the Reserve Bank. That's why you will never find anything about it on the Internet." The UN is supposedly "legally bound" to respond to a verification request but only as long as the requisite protocols and procedures are followed, otherwise "no response will be received from the United Nations." The only way a verification request can be made is "through the UN headquarters in New York or Geneva, not via, or by, any sub-office of the UN.". According to Keith Scott, the OITC's "Chief of Cabinet", the OITC is run by the UN "under a concept of plausible deniability."

These claims have been denied by the United Nations. The UN has stated emphatically that "there is no such thing as a 'UN Charter Control Number,' quoted by the organisation to prove its validity." The UN's representative in Fiji was unable to "verify its existence and its security rating" and the UN's representative in Colombia has stated that all UN agencies are listed on the UN's official website and that they know of no secret agencies.

Scott claims that the OITC was set up and was controlled under the Federal Reserve under the Bank of International Settlements". OITC funds are said to be "held in an organization called the Institutional Parent Administration Account."

Scott has also stated that the OITC's funds are "held in the Institutional Parent Administration Account of the Federal Reserve System." However, the US government has stated that "within the Federal Reserve there exists no organization or department with the initials OITC, nor anything similar to this." The Bank for International Settlements – an international organization representing central banks – has also denied any knowledge of the OITC.

The physical location of the OITC is also unclear. According to a document produced by the OITC in March 2006, it has offices in Malaysia, the Netherlands, the United States, Australia and Ecuador. Elsewhere it has been claimed that the OITC has head offices in Singapore and Cambodia. However, the UK Daily Telegraph noted in 2005 that "the Bangkok number on their letterhead doesn't exist" and in April 2006 the Fiji Islands Trade and Investment Bureau found that the OITC "neither has any fixed address or office, nor are there any reliable contact addresses." Correspondence said to be from OITC officers lists Freeserve e-mail addresses as contacts. The organization's website, which purports to be authorized by various official organizations, is http://www.unoitc.org.

Speaking at a press conference in Fiji, self-described OITC representative Masi Kaumaitotoya told the local media: "Don't you ever, ever, ever again report negatively on OITC or we'll sue you for defamation." Individuals claiming to represent the OITC have also accused online critics of "serious defamation in the plural" [sic].

== The OITC and MG Rover ==
The OITC first came to public attention in 2005 with an attempted bid for the failed MG Rover Group in the United Kingdom. The London Daily Telegraph reported that "a Mr David Sale claim to have offered to buy MG Rover for $5 billion." The Financial Times reported that the OITC had given the administrators a deposit of one pound, made out as a postal order. According to Sale, Rover's administrators PriceWaterhouseCoopers (PWC) were refusing to take their bid seriously even though (according to them) Prime Minister Tony Blair had acknowledged it in a letter. However, PWC told the Telegraph that it had never heard of the OITC and the Prime Minister's office had no record of the OITC's letter. The bid met with considerable skepticism among MG Rover enthusiasts and was evidently discarded by the administrators, as the OITC did not appear on the final list of bidders. No proof has ever been provided of the supposed letter to Mr Blair.

== The OITC and Ecuador ==
In late 2005 Germania Ullauri, the mayoress of the Ecuadorian municipality of Oña, travelled to Cambodia to meet representatives of the OITC to discuss an investment proposal. According to the local media, OITC called itself variously the Oficina Internacional de Control del Tesoro or Oficina Internacional de Control de Tesorería. It represented itself as being headquartered in Singapore, Cambodia and Malaysia, and declared its intention to establish an office in the Ecuadorian city of Guayaquil.

The OITC appointed Ullauri as its "ambassador" to the 219 municipalities of Ecuador. Following her trip to Cambodia, she convened a meeting of municipal leaders from Ecuador's Azuay, Cañar and Morona-Santiago Provinces to brief them on the OITC's proposals.

The OITC proposed to invest US$150 million in a hydro-electric project in the region, subject to Ullauri placing $20,000 in a bank account in Kuala Lumpur, Malaysia as a deposit. She paid in the money as requested in December 2005 but several months later there was no sign of the promised millions from the OITC. In mid-April 2006 Ullauri publicly denounced the OITC and two Ecuadorians said to be its local agents.

== The OITC and Fiji ==
In late February 2006, the OITC made a public offer to invest F$6 billion (US$3.5 billion) in a bank for indigenous Fijians, to be established in conjunction with the Viti Landowners and Resources Association (VLRA). Another $2.5 billion was later offered, for a total of $6 billion. The OITC's "Chief of Cabinet", Keith Scott, met with the Fijian finance minister Ratu Jone Kubuabola and 215 middle level Fijian chiefs to promise that the money would be brought to Fiji and that "this cannot be stopped by any human being." According to Ratu Osea Gavidi of the VLRA, the bank would help Fijians to access funds for development purposes which they could not get from commercial organizations, and so make it easier for Fijians to obtain loans. Ratu Osea claimed that the OITC had already invested $400 billion in China, though the Chinese Embassy in Fiji was unable to confirm this.

A memorandum of understanding was signed on 3 March between Scott and the head of the VLRA, under which the OITC was to provide 50% of the bank's funding and the landowners the other 50%. They were expected to use their land and resources as collateral. Under the terms of the MOU, the OITC would fund equipment for landowners, the development of a "Community Aged Center", the development of a community-owned tourist and resort centre, the construction of modern prisons and support for a reforestation programme. The MOU was signed in chaotic circumstances which culminated in the attending journalists being thrown out by security guards acting for the OITC. Ratu Osea Gavidi subsequently claimed that the OITC had already deposited $3 billion in a bank account but the Reserve Bank of Fiji's Deputy Governor, Sada Reddy, denied that any such transaction had taken place.

The OITC's offer attracted immediate suspicion from a number of sources. The Fijian media played a leading role in questioning the bona fides of the OITC and pointed out the lack of verifiable information, to the evident annoyance of OITC representatives who threatened to sue "for so much the biggest insurance company in the world would not be able to pay the damages." In response, the country's leading newspaper, the Fiji Times, ran a front-page open letter to the OITC's Keith Scott, declaring: "You cannot continue to refuse to tell us, the people of Fiji, who you are. ... Mere words and assurances are not enough. We want hard, commercial facts that we can check and verify."

=== Government views ===
The Fijian government expressed serious concerns about the deal and the bona fides of the OITC. Fiji's finance ministry noted that the OITC had provided no proof that it had the money and the home affairs minister, Josefa Vosanibola, asked the immigration service and police to investigate the bona fides of Scott and the OITC. Vosanibola said that the government had no knowledge of either party and noted that neither Scott nor the OITC had submitted an application to do business in Fiji, as required by immigration regulations. The Native Land Trust Board also told the Viti Landowners and Resources Association that it had "no legal authority to sell native land privately."

The Prime Minister of Fiji, Laisenia Qarase, who is himself a former bank managing director, also questioned the deal. He told the Fiji Times newspaper, "I doubt the people will see the money" and commented that "no one in their right mind would inject such a large sum of money into an economy as small as ours. They (VLRA) must be careful when someone comes along and promises such a thing, they must check it out first."

Following the Fijian government's request for a police investigation, Fiji Commissioner of Police Andrew Hughes told the media that "nothing that [the police] received gave credence or legitimacy to the organisation and Mr Scott ... What we can say is that the information that we do have at hand leads us to conclude that the proposed transaction is highly irregular, it is questionable and leaves me with a profound level of suspicion." He urged the Fijian parties to the OITC deal not to "send any money if it's requested as some form of an advanced fee for this transaction to proceed" (the sending of advance fees is a widely used method of fraud). He also disclosed that Keith Scott was "known by Australian authorities", though he was not at liberty to provide further details.

The OITC's deal was viewed with scepticism in other areas of Fijian society. The country's Great Council of Chiefs expressed concern, noting that there had been recent high-profile instances of fraud, and advised Fijians to be careful about assessing such promises. Fiji's newspapers ran numerous letters questioning the veracity of the OITC's claims. An online poll run by asked "Is Dr Keith Scott and OITC's multi-billion dollar donation to Fiji landowners genuine?"; 89% of respondents voted no. The Fiji Sun published a strongly worded denunciation of the OITC, calling it "a scam in the making" and a "get-rich scheme". However, some other prominent groups supported the deal. The Assembly of Christian Churches, an affiliate of the Viti Landowners and Resources Association, supported the deal and stated that it had no doubts about the bona fides of the OITC.

In the end, the deal apparently fell through after the Fiji Islands Trade and Investment Board (FTIB) rejected an application to set up a bank, which had been submitted by an entity called Triunion Investment Holdings Limited on behalf of the OITC. The FTIB found that the OITC "neither has any fixed address or office nor are there any reliable contact addresses which are pivotal for approval of applications." The decision produced an angry response from the head of the VLRA, who vowed that "Our relationship with the OITC will continue no matter what."

== OITC story unravels ==
In 2010, the secretive OITC surfaced in Cambodia’s capital Phnom Penh. The real estate firm Asia Real Property Co, Ltd identified itself in promotional material as the subsidiary of an international real estate consultancy known as "ARP-OITC Group Co Ltd (Cambodia)". This was posted on a signboard in front of the office on Phnom Penh’s Norodom Boulevard.

During an interview with the Phnom Penh Post in October 2010 at the ARP-OITC offices in Phnom Penh, executive managing director Soush Saroeun claimed that the firm was involved in joint ventures with companies from France, Canada and Vietnam. As proof of his claim, he provided a document dated December 29, 2009, that was purportedly signed by HSBC Group Finance Director "Dr David J Flint". As of December 2009, HSBC’s Group Finance Director was Douglas Flint.

Soush Saroeun were arrested on December 18, 2010 on Street 240 in the Daun Penh district. According to Cambodia’s Minister of Information Khieu Kanharith, Prime Minister Hun Sen had personally ordered investigation into the case, On December 20, 2010, the two were charged with forgery by the Phnom Penh Municipal Court after allegedly fabricating documents claiming ties to the United Nations, the United States government and HSBC Bank. Keith Scott left Cambodia hurriedly, shortly after these arrests.

== See also ==
- Dominion of Melchizedek
