= List of county exclaves in England and Wales 1844–1974 =

Post-1844 exclaves of English and Welsh counties

Until 1844, many of the counties in England and Wales had exclaves (detached parts) entirely surrounded by other counties. Under the Counties (Detached Parts) Act 1844, many of these exclaves were absorbed by the counties within which they were located. The process was based on a schedule attached to the Parliamentary Boundaries Act 1832, drawn up by a boundary commission headed by the surveyor Thomas Drummond.

Nevertheless, a number of exclaves remained; these were dealt with in a piecemeal manner over a period of decades.

The Local Government Act 1894 empowered the county councils of administrative counties to exchange areas in order to make a more effective local government area. As the Local Government Act 1888 had redefined the lieutenancy and shrievalty to be based on administrative counties, the changes also affected them as well as judicial boundaries. Accordingly, many anomalies in county boundaries were removed in the next three years, including the elimination of outlying areas of Derbyshire and Huntingdonshire.

The last major transfer of areas was in 1931, when the boundaries of Gloucestershire, Warwickshire, and Worcestershire were realigned. Following the creation of a new administrative county of Huntingdon and Peterborough in 1965, and boundary changes at Dudley in 1966, Lancashire and Flintshire were left as the only counties with detached areas; these remained right up to the abolition of the respective county councils in 1974.

== Terminology ==
- Exclave – part of a county completely detached from its main territory, and surrounded by territory of another county or counties.
- Satellite exclave – many exclaves were accompanied by smaller ones, ranging from field strips of a fraction of an acre (see Donisthorpe under Derbyshire, below) to farms of a couple of hundred acres (see Caversfield under Buckinghamshire). Small exclaves were usually close to the main exclave or to the main county boundary; it was rare to find them at a substantial distance from other territory belonging to their county (see Borden Wood under Hampshire for an example).
- Counter-exclave – an exclave of the surrounding county within an exclave. Also known as a second-order exclave.
- Counter-counter exclave – a county had an exclave in another county which had a counter-exclave within it, and within this was an exclave of the same county as the first exclave. Also known as a third-order exclave. There used to be one in Wales (see Caernarvonshire in the list), and ten in the Shropshire exclave of Halesowen.
- Enclave – a "hole" in a county's territory created by an exclave of another county. Note that not all exclaves are enclaves, as the former might be on the border between two other counties.
- Counter-enclave – a portion of the surrounding county within the territory of an enclave.
- Semi-exclave – part of a county detached by land from its main territory, but on a marine coastline which the latter also abuts.
- Riparian semi-exclave – found where a river or river estuary forms the boundary between two counties, and one county has territory on the "wrong" side of the river which is only accessible directly from that county by using a boat. These are usually, but not always, caused by the river changing course (for example, by cutting off a meander to create an oxbow lake). However, there were three examples on the other side of a tidal estuary through which a county boundary ran, two in Kent and one in Cornwall (q.v.). These riparian semi-exclaves are not legally true exclaves, because rivers and estuaries are county territory in English law.
- Salient – a protrusion of a county's territory into that of another county or counties.
- Pene-exclave – a salient which cannot be accessed by public right of way except through another county. These usually have a narrow "neck" joining the salient to the main territory. In England they can be distinguished as "vehicular" (bridlepath and footpath access only), "equestrian" (footpath access only) or "pedestrian" (no direct access).
- Divided parish – county boundaries usually coincided with parish ones, but not invariably. The former could run through parishes, and many county exclaves and salients divided parishes in this way.
- Parish exclave – exclaves belonging to parishes used to be more common than those of counties. A county exclave might contain one or more parishes if large, but might also include parish exclaves. Small county exclaves were usually parish exclaves as well, but not invariably: see "Monks House" under County Durham below.
- County corporate – Twenty towns and cities in England and Wales had the historical status of County corporate, making them equivalent to counties. The majority became county boroughs in 1888. Thirteen of them were enclaves within their counties. Several of them which were county towns, for example Chester and Norwich, contained counter-enclaves of their counties which comprised the administrative headquarters of the latter.

== Areas transferred ==
=== Total number of exclaves ===
The following list has 204 exclaves in total, including 11 semi-exclaves with a coastline and generating 76 legal issues. The semi-exclaves were in Caernarvonshire, Denbighshire, Devon, County Durham and Lancashire. Riparian semi-exclaves are not counted. After 1844, 106 exclaves survived which amounted to 28 surviving legal issues (multi-parish exclaves counted singly).

The 1844 Act resulted in a list of individual legal enactments targeting boundary anomalies. It counted a set of exclaves belonging to a single parish or township as a single legal issue. Conversely, a single exclave containing territory of two parishes was treated as two legal issues. Counter-exclaves were not regarded as separate legal issues, because they vanished when the exclave concerned was abolished. In contrast, after 1844 legal issues concerning exclaves could be bundled together and dealt with by a single legal order, as happened in the 1931 re-ordering of the boundaries of Gloucestershire, Worcestershire and Warwickshire.

=== Bedfordshire ===
The county had one exclave after 1844, and eight abolished then (pre-1844 total 9, legal 3; post-1844 total 1, legal 1):

- Aspley Heath (1). This was an exclave separated from the county's main territory by the width of a highway. The exclave was eliminated by the annexation of territory from Buckinghamshire to create a civil parish in 1883.

Abolished in 1844:

- Meppershall (1). The Hertfordshire exclave of Meppershall contained a small counter-enclave, on the south side of Fildyke Road near the junction with Chapel Road. This was abolished when the exclave was annexed.
- Shillington (6). Exclaves of the parish of Shillington, Bedfordshire in Hertfordshire were transferred to the latter. There were five small ones in fields of Pirton next to Oughtonhead Common, the largest being of very irregular shape and another containing a counter-exclave of Hertfordshire. A sixth contained Shillington Mill at Ickleford.
- Whipsnade (1). Balligdon Bottom, 160 acres (65 hectares), an exclave of Whipsnade parish in Beechwood Park. The area remained a parish exclave until it was added to Markyate parish in 1897. Beechwood had been a wooded common in Anglo-Saxon times shared by several villages, and the exclave was granted to Whipsnade in exchange for its rights when the Benedictine nunnery of "St Giles in the Wood" was founded on the common in the 12th century.

=== Berkshire ===
The county had no exclaves after 1844, and three were abolished then (pre-1844 total 3, legal 3; post-1844 total 0):

- Great Barrington (1). Part of the parish of Great Barrington, otherwise in Gloucestershire and the exclave was transferred to it. This ran the width of the parish along the north bank of the River Windrush, and the boundary ran through the village. This exclave was not shown on the first Ordnance Survey, so is not on the online "Historic County Boundaries Project" map.
- Langford and Little Faringdon (1). Langford and Little Faringdon townships (now civil parishes), together forming an exclave transferred to Oxfordshire. Samuel Lewis 1803 wrote that only part of Langford township belonged to Berkshire, with the county boundary running through the parish church. The "Historic County Boundaries Project" has the whole township in Berkshire, following the first Ordnance Survey.
- Shilton (1). Most of the parish of Shilton formed an exclave transferred to Oxfordshire. The parish had its own exclave comprising a 7 acres (2.8 hectares) meadow next to the River Windrush south-east of Witney, which was already in Oxfordshire.

Two pene-exclaves were abolished after 1844:

- That part of the divided parish of Inglesham in Berkshire was transferred to Wiltshire to join the rest in 1844. It contained part the village, while the church was in a small exclave of Wiltshire. The south part of the parish with the hamlet of Upper Inglesham was also in Wiltshire. The pene-enclave was a large field by the River Thames north-west of Upper Inglesham, inaccessible directly from Berkshire. The boundary survived for parliamentary purposes into the latter 19th century.
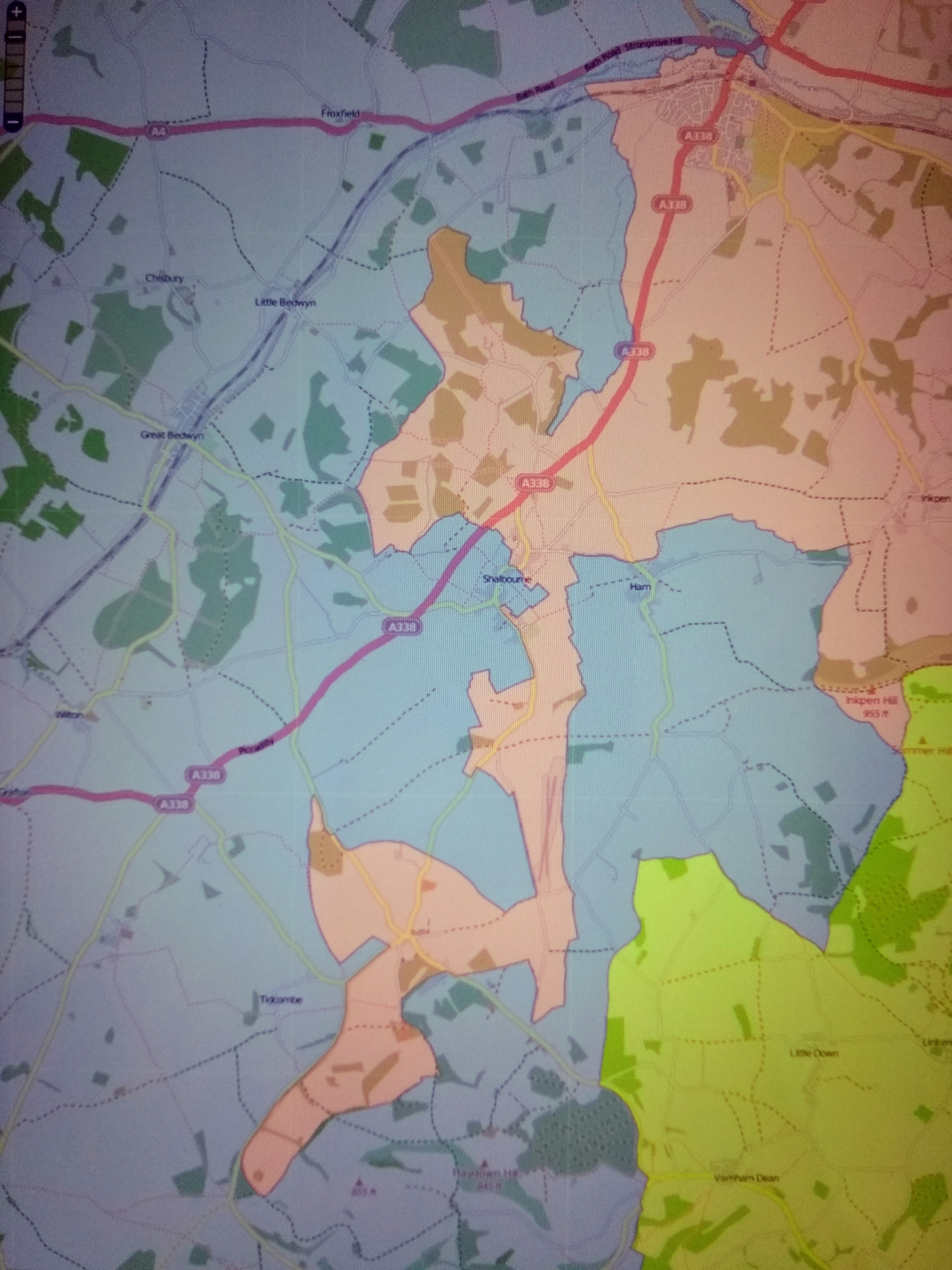
  Shalbourne salient of Berkshire, briefly in Wiltshire 1844 (Historic County Borders Project)
- The parish of Shalbourne was divided between Berkshire and Wiltshire, the former having the parish church and the tithing of Oxenwood. The long, narrow and irregularly shaped salient was transferred to Wiltshire and the parish united only in 1895. Oxenwood was included in the 1844 Act by mistake, as it was erroneously listed as an exclave. The relevant Order was cancelled after the error was pointed out.

Riparian semi-exclaves at Oxford:

- The River Thames was selected as the northern boundary of the county, but from north of Wytham past Oxford to beyond the mouth of the River Cherwell the river subsequently changed its course. At the city centre, this left a strip of territory on the north bank in Berkshire. Included were Folly Bridge Island and an area north of Folly Bridge, adjacent to two riparian semi-enclaves. The first was Deans Ham, in between the river and Christ Church Meadown. The second was Aston's Eyot, the other side of the old channel of the Cherwell and including what is now "Boathouse Island". These areas were annexed to Oxford when it became a county borough in 1890. However, the boundary between the Roman Catholic Archdiocese of Birmingham and the Roman Catholic Diocese of Portsmouth continues to follow the old county boundary.

=== Buckinghamshire ===
The county had four exclaves after 1844, and five abolished then (pre-1844 total 9, legal 6; post-1844 total 4, legal 2):

- Drayton Beauchamp (2). Two exclaves of the parish of Drayton Beauchamp were transferred to Hertfordshire, and annexed to the parish of Tring in 1886. The larger was Whittle Farm, 106 acres (43 hectares) and the other a field of 5.4 acres (2.2 hectares) on Cheddington Lane east of Long Marston which is now most of the village cricket club.
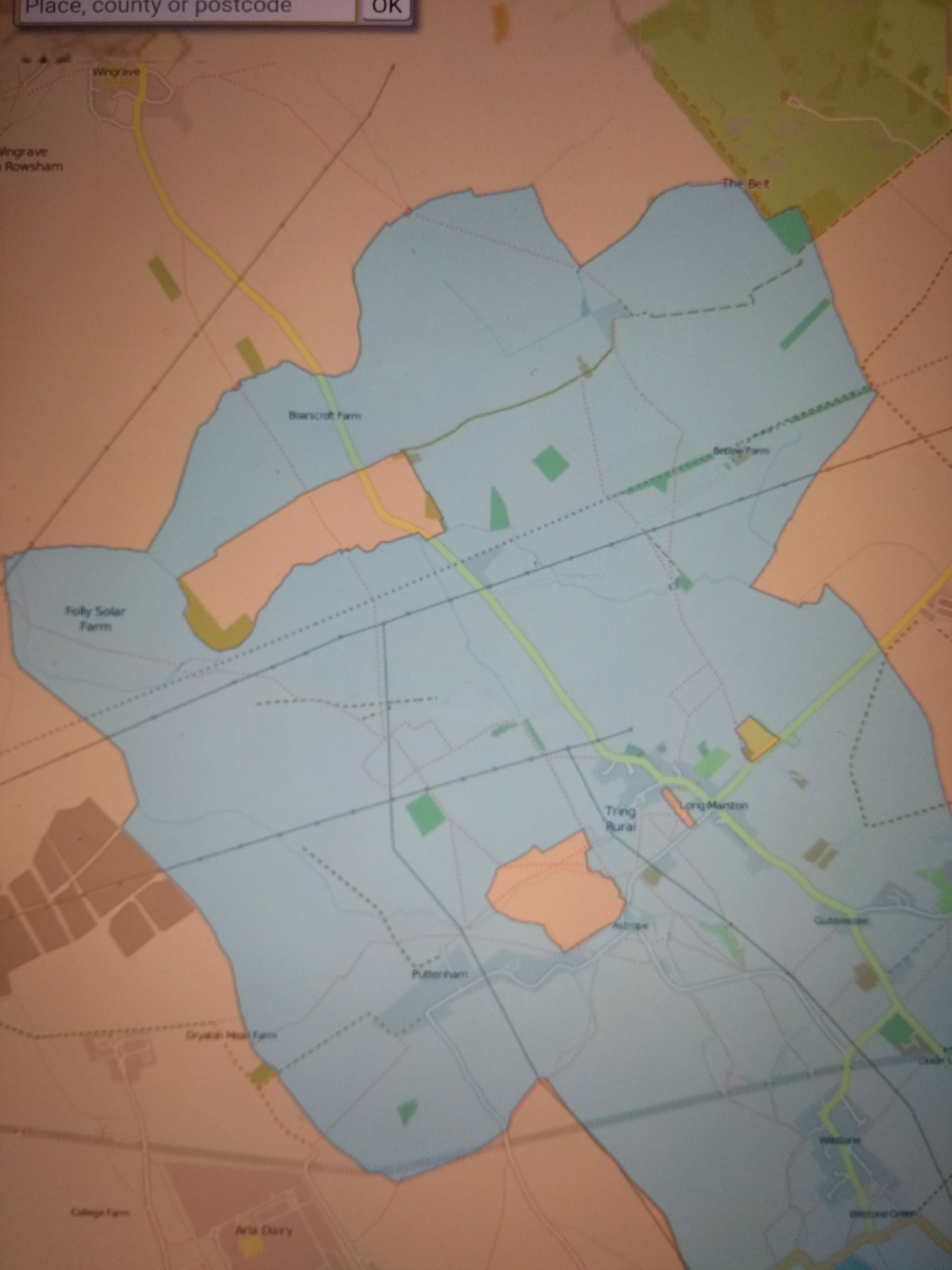
  Small exclaves of Buckinghamshire in Hertfordshire, at Long Marston. (Historic County Borders Project)
- Marsworth (2). Two exclaves of the parish of Marsworth were transferred to Hertfordshire. The larger was a group of fields by the hamlet of Astrope of 52 acres (21 hectares), and the other was a strip of land in Long Marston village, 2.2 acres (0.89 hectares). The former was annexed to the parish of Puttenham and the latter to that of Tring in 1886.

Abolished in 1844:

- Caversfield (3). The parish of Caversfield was transferred to Oxfordshire, comprising one major exclave and two satellite exclaves. As well as the main bloc of territory of 1,278 acres (517 hectares), there was an exclave of 216 acres (87 hectares) comprising fields to the east, and one of 3.6 acres (1.5 hectares) comprising the south-east side of the village street of Stratton Audley. The two parish exclaves were transferred to the parish of Stratton Audley in 1888. Before enclosure, in 1770 the latter parish had an open-field system the strips of which were divided between itself and Caversfield in a complicated manner, and the county boundary followed this. The 216-acre exclave was a consolidation of the Caversfield strips. The 1832 schedule listed the two Stratton Audley exclaves as the "Chapelry of Stratton Audley", although there was never a chapel separate from the parish church, and this was treated as s separate legal case by the 1844 Act.
- Lillingstone Lovell (1). The parish of Lillingstone Lovell was transferred from Oxfordshire. This united the parish and county exclave of Lillingstone Dayrell with Buckinghamshire proper.
- Luffield Abbey (1). The exclave of the extra-parochial territory of Luffield Abbey in Buckinghamshire was transferred to Northamptonshire and annexed to the parish of Silverstone. The territory had been in two portions, and the main portion remained in the former county.

One pene-exclave was abolished after 1844:

- A very irregularly shaped pene-exclave was wrapped around the Hertfordshire parish of Little Gaddesden. Hudnall to the east, a parish exclave of Edlesborough, was annexed to Little Gaddesden and Hertfordshire in 1885, and Nettleden to the south-east, which had been a parish exclave of Pitstone, was made a parish in Hertfordshire in 1895.

Three riparian semi-exclaves survived on the River Thames until fairly recently:

- A lost meander north-east of Egham, Surrey left a portion of Buckinghamshire on the Surrey side of the river, at Woodhaw. The Runnymede Bridge was built across it in 1961.
- The village of Laleham had a parcel of land on the wrong side of the river, on Penton Hook.
- A lost meander at Windsor left Deadwater Ait as part of Buckinghamshire on the Windsor side of the river. This was abolished when Eton was annexed to Windsor in 1998.

=== Cambridgeshire ===
The historic county had no exclaves, with one dubious exception:

- The Liberty of Ely Place, adjacent to the City of London in Holborn. There are many online and printed references to date, stating that this was an exclave of Cambridgeshire until the formation of the London Borough of Camden in 1965. The evidence is alleged to be that the licence of its pub, the "Olde Mitre", was obtained from the Cambridgeshire magistrates not the Middlesex ones. The liberty marked the site of the "Inn" (that is, the London town house or palace) of the Bishop of Ely in the Middle Ages, hence the Cambridgeshire connection. The story was debunked in print by H. V. Morton in 1940, and lacks reliable citations.

=== Caernarvonshire ===
The county had two exclaves after 1844 (pre-1844 total 2, legal 1; post-1844 total 2, legal 1):

- Llysfaen and Eirias (2). The county had a large (2711.4 acres or 1097 ha) semi-exclave consisting of the parishes of Llysfaen and Eirias and including the town of Old Colwyn, which was transferred to the surrounding county of Denbighshire and the urban district of Colwyn Bay in 1923. In turn it surrounded a counter-semi-exclave of Denbighshire including the east part of Old Colwyn, which had very complex borders. This counter-semi-exclave in turn contained a counter-counter-semi-exclave of Caernarvonshire, that of "Coed-coch Cottage" covering 1.6 acres (0.65 hectares).
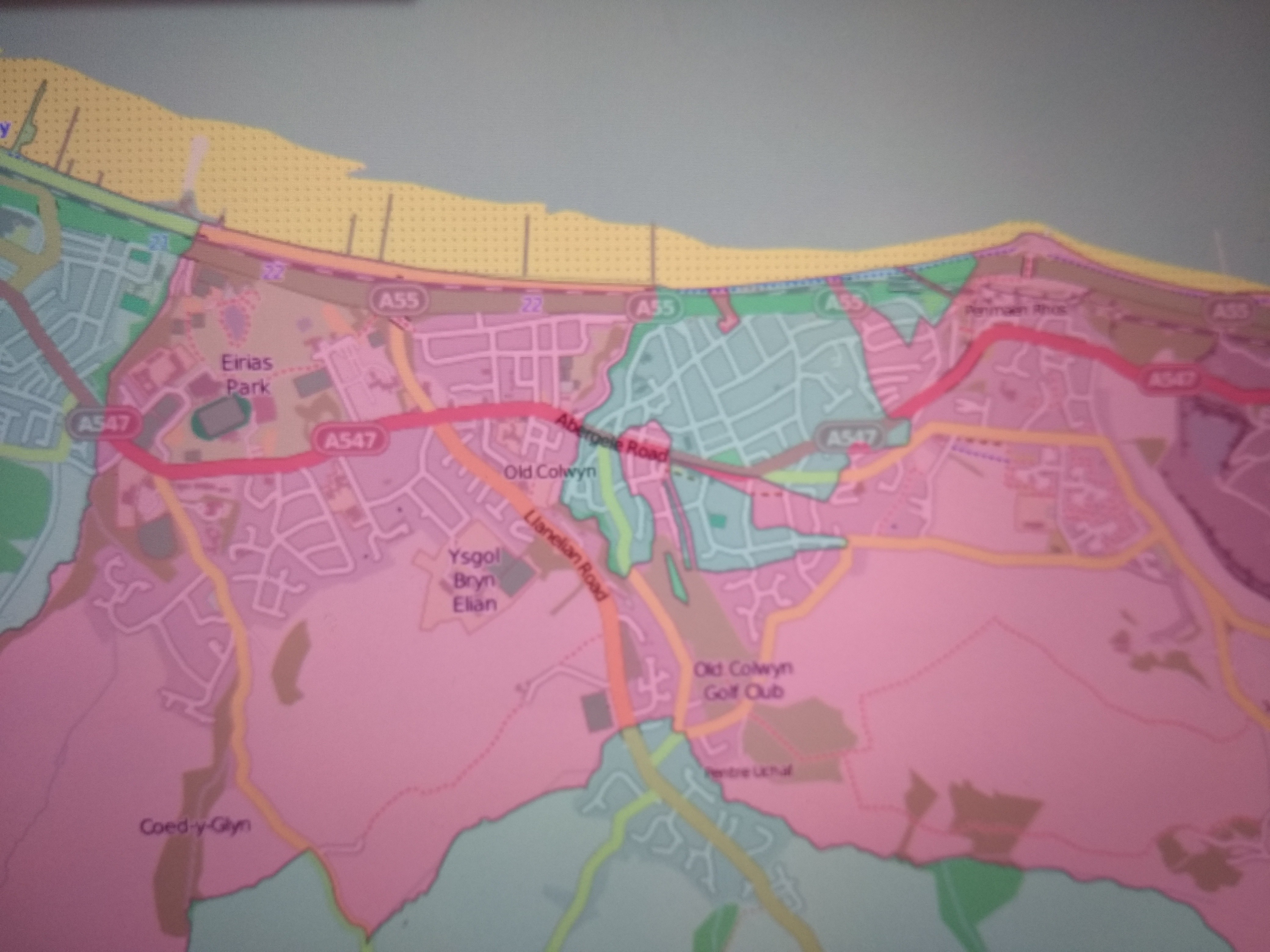
  Nested exclaves of Caernarvonshire (pink) and Denbighshire. (Historic County Borders Project)

=== Cheshire ===
The county had no exclaves in other counties. However, it did have a counter-enclave:

- Chester Castle was an enclave of the county of Cheshire within the city of Chester, which in turn was historically a county corporate and so an enclave within Cheshire. It comprised Chester Castle and some adjoining territory. The situation remained until 1974, the city having become a county borough in 1888. The territory remains a civil parish, with no inhabitants (2020).

Riparian semi-exclaves:

- River Dee. The border with Denbighshire between Aldford and Shocklach (the Welsh–English border) runs along the River Dee, but this river meanders at will. Dropped meanders mean that there are three riparian semi-enclaves of Cheshire near Shocklach. These have been left alone.
- River Mersey. The border with Lancashire ran along the River Mersey, but the river had many meanders and was liable to change its course. This left many portions of both counties on the wrong side of it. Most of the border has been superseded, but a portion remains between the boroughs of Stockport and Tameside south of Denton, and this still illustrates the problem.

=== Cornwall ===
The county had one riparian semi-exclave after 1844:

- Saltash. Historically the county has had only one detached portion, a riparian semi-exclave on the east, Devon side of the estuary of the River Tamar estuary opposite Saltash. This meant that the ancient ferry there had both ends in Cornwall. The area belonged to Saltash, St Stephen parish, but was transferred to St Budeaux parish and Devon after 1844.

=== Denbighshire ===
The county had two exclaves and three semi-exclaves after 1844, and one abolished then (pre-1844 total 6, legal 2; post-1844 total 5, legal 1):

- Llandrillo yn Rhos (5) The major semi-exclave of Caernarfonshire (see above) contained a semi-exclave of Denbighshire including the east part of Old Colwyn. This in turn had two satellite semi-exclaves north of Penmaen-Rhôs, separated by a very narrow corridor. In addition, it was accompanied by two small satellite exclaves forming thin strips south-east of Old Colwyn. This total of five detached portions of Denbighshire, 139 acres (56 hectares), belonged to the parish of Llandrillo yn Rhos. It was annexed to the semi-enclave of Caernarfonshire in 1879.

One exclave was abolished in 1844:

- Carreghofa (1). The township of Carreghofa was on the English border, and included the Welsh half of the divided village of Llanymynech.

Riparian semi-exclaves:

The River Dee formed the border from near Chester to near Chirk, but was liable to change course and drop meanders. As a result, there were two riparian semi-exclaves on the border with the exclave of Flintshire known as English Maelor:

- By Althrey Hall in Flintshire, one of a pair of lost meanders and so accompanying a riparian semi-exclave of Flintshire.
- A large meadow west of Shocklach, by the meeting point with Flintshire and Shropshire.

=== Derbyshire ===
The county had twenty-nine exclaves after 1844, one very large and the rest small (or tiny) satellites of it, totalling 8,285 acres (3,353 hectares), and one abolished then (pre-1844 total 30, legal 4; post-1844 total 29, legal 3):

- Appleby Magna, Chilcote, Measham, Oakthorpe & Donisthorpe, Stretton en le Field and Willesley (9). A block of parishes formed a large exclave of Derbyshire in Leicestershire: Appleby Magna North (partly in Leicestershire), Chilcote, Measham, Oakthorpe and Donisthorpe (partly in Leicestershire), Stretton en le Field and Willesley This was transferred to Leicestershire 1897. At the same time, the parishes of Netherseal and Overseal were received from Leicestershire in compensation. The village of Appleby Magna had been divided between the two counties, with three satellite exclaves of Derbyshire and four small counter-exclaves of Leicestershire. The fields of Donisthorpe had been allotted to the two counties in a very complicated manner, featuring irregular interlocking salients with five satellite exclaves of Derbyshire and twelve counter-exclaves of Leicestershire.
- Edingale (3). The village Edingale was divided between Derbyshire and Staffordshire, with two townships of the same name belonging to Croxall and Alrewas. Derbyshire had three exclaves, and Staffordshire three. All were abolished when Edingale civil parish was created in 1936 and put in Staffordshire.
- Packington and Ravenstone (17). The parish of Packington in Leicestershire included the chapelry of Snibston as a large parish exclave to the east, separated by the parish of Ravenstone. The main body of Packington contained three exclaves of Derbyshire (two meeting at a point), with ten satellite exclaves. Ravenstone had one larger exclave (including much of the village), and Snibston had three. All seventeen exclaves were transferred to Leicestershire in 1844, the latter four forming part of the new parish of Ravenstone with Snibston. Packington was adjacent to the large Derbyshire exclave listed below.

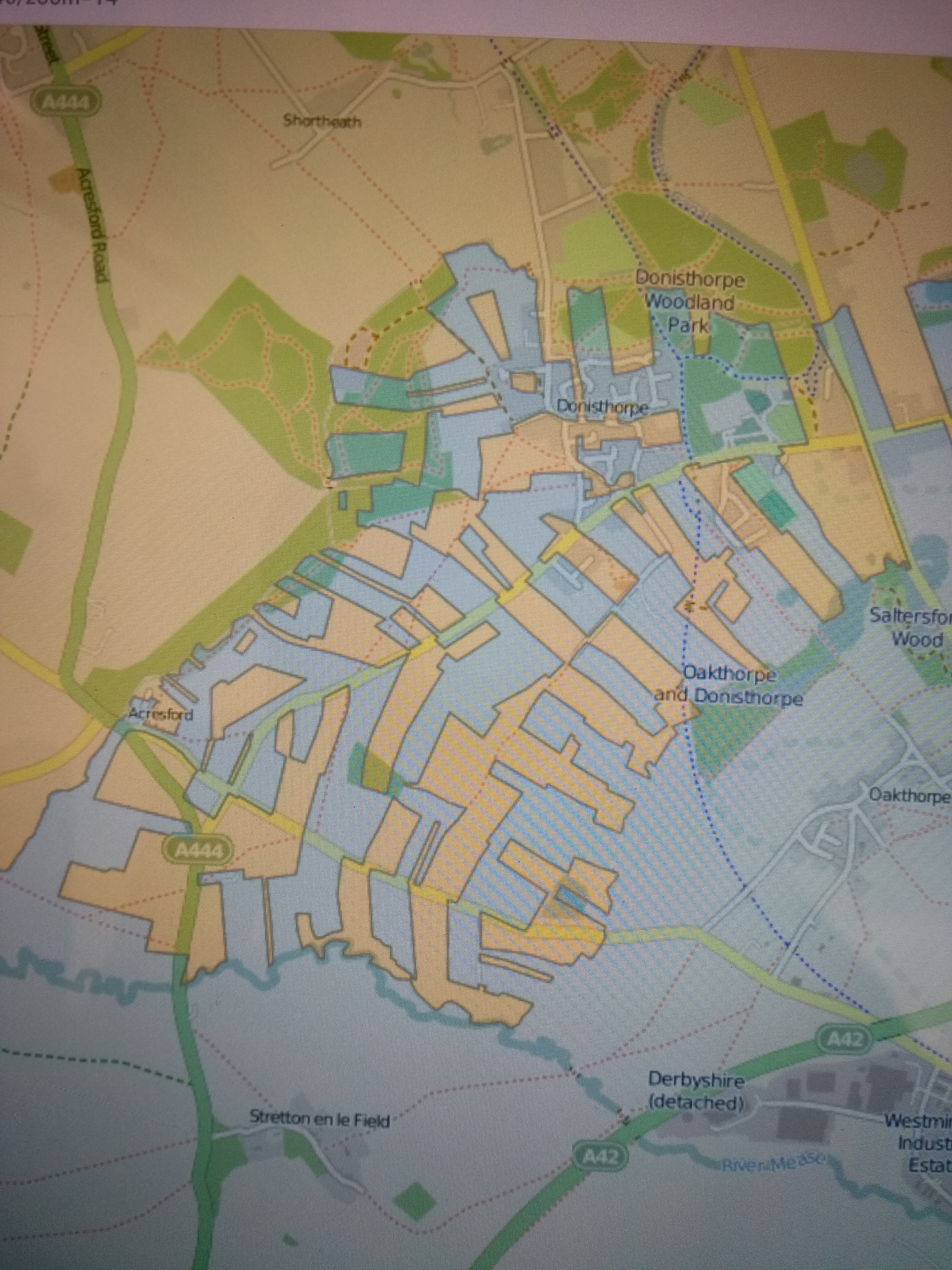
Derbyshire (in blue) and Leicestershire at Donisthorpe. (Historic County Borders Project)

One exclave was abolished in 1844:

- Foston and Scropton (1). Part of the township of Foston and Scropton (in the parish of Scropton), transferred to Staffordshire. This was a set of fields, and remained as a township exclave.

Riparian semi-exclaves:

- The River Dove, where it forms the boundary between Derbyshire and Staffordshire, has changed course in many places in between Rocester and its confluence with the River Trent, leaving several riparian semi-enclaves of both counties along it. These have mostly been left alone. Derbyshire has thirteen with another two connected by bridge; Staffordshire twelve, with a further three connected by bridge.

=== Devon ===
The county had no exclaves after 1844; one exclave and two semi-exclaves were abolished then (pre-1844 total 3, legal 3; post-1844 total 0):

- Maker (2). Two semi-exclaves forming part of the parish of Maker were transferred to Cornwall. These comprised the tithing of Vaultershome, the larger one including the hamlets of Dodbrook, Kingsand and Cremyll and the smaller being an estate called Mendenick near St John.
- Thorncombe with Beerhall and Easthay (1). The exclave containing the parish of Thorncombe was transferred to Dorset. It also contained the tithing of Beerhall and Easthay, a parish exclave belonging to Axminster which was treated as a separate legal issue by the 1844 Act. Somehow, the schedule of Orders generated by the Act had this portion of Axminster transferred from Dorset to Devon. Rather, it ended up as a detached portion of the parish in Dorset until added to Thorncombe.
- It also had a counter-enclave in the county corporate of Exeter, comprising Exeter Castle.

=== Dorset ===
The county had no exclaves after 1844, and one was abolished then (pre-1844 total 1, legal 1; post-1844 total 0):

- Stockland and Dalwood (1). The parishes of Stockland and Dalwood together (the latter was a township at the time).

=== County Durham ===
The county had no exclaves after 1844; one exclave and three semi-exclaves were abolished then (pre-1844 total 4, legal 5; post-1844 total 0):

- Bedlingtonshire (1). The district of Bedlingtonshire, basically the parish of Bedlington, was transferred to Northumberland.
- Craikshire (1). The district of Craikshire, basically the parish of Crayke, was transferred to the North Riding of Yorkshire. This was the only true exclave (because it had no sea border)
- Islandshire and Norhamshire (1). A large triangular semi-exclave occupying the right bank of the River Tweed downstream from Cornhill-on-Tweed and the coastline from Tweedmouth to Budle Bay, but excluding Berwick-upon-Tweed which was a county in its own right. Lindisfarne and the Farne Islands were included. The area consisted of three administrative units, Norhamshire, Islandshire and the extra-parochial Farne Islands. Transferred to Northumberland. Counted as two legal issues by the 1844 Act.
- Monks' House (1). The farmstead of Monks' House was a semi-enclave of 0.6 acres (0.24 hectares) at Bamburgh, forming an extra-parochial district. It functioned as a mainland port for the monks living on Inner Farne, being donated for this purpose in 1257 by King Henry III. This is the smallest separately administered exclave in this list. Counted as part of Islandshire by the 1844 Act.

=== Flintshire ===
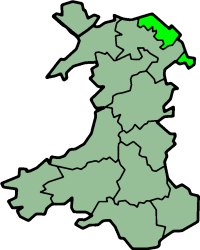
Flintshire highlighted with Wales's historic county boundaries, showing Maelor Saesneg separated from coastal Flintshire by Denbighshire

Flintshire was unique in maintaining two exclaves until 1974. Historically there were eight (pre-1844 total 8, legal 4; post-1844 total 8, legal 4):

- Abenbury Fechan (5). The township of Abenbury Fechan, east of Wrexham, consisted of one larger and four smaller exclaves totalling 160 acres (65 ha). The township was transferred to the Denbighshire township of Abenbury Fawr in 1885. The small exclaves were Woodbine Farm, Hullah Farm, Llwyn-on and Five Fords.
- English Maelor (1). The largest of the exclaves was the area of English Maelor or Maelor Saesneg, which became the Overton Rural District in 1894, and was renamed Maelor Rural District in 1953.
- Marford-and-Hoseley (2). The second largest exclave was the township of Marford-and-Hoseley in the parish of Gresford (otherwise in Denbighshire), 589 acres (238 hectares). Originally this township had a satellite exclave called Marford Mill that included part of the village of Rossett, 15 acres (6.1 hectares), but this was transferred to the Denbighshire township of Allington in 1885. At the same date, small exclaves of Gresford township (to be distinguished from the parish) and Allington township were transferred from Denbighshire and added to the main Marford-and-Hoseley exclave. The former was Marford Wood, the latter a small estate called "The Elms". The augmented exclave became a parish in the Hawarden Rural District in 1894, although surrounded by Wrexham Rural District in Denbighshire. It remained an exclave of Flintshire until local government reorganisation in 1974, when the two rural districts mentioned were united in Wrexham Maelor.

Riparian semi-exclaves:

The River Dee formed the border of Denbighshire with the exclave of English Maelor, but was liable to change course and drop meanders. As a result, there were riparian semi-exclaves on this border:

- Part of Pickhill Meadows north-east of Bangor-on-Dee.
- Across the river from Althrey Hall, one of a pair of lost meanders and so accompanying a riparian semi-exclave of Denbighshire.
- The parish of Erbistock was divided between Denbighshire and Flintshire, with the latter portion forming an irregularly shaped salient on the wrong side of the river from English Maelor. It contained the parish church. The parish was consolidated within Denbighshire in 1897.

=== Gloucestershire ===
After 1844, Gloucestershire had no true exclaves and six were abolished then (pre-1844 total 6, legal 6; post-1844 total 0).

However, the north of the county had two pene-enclaves (that is, areas only accessible by public highway through another territory) which were only joined to the rest of the county by narrow necks of land. These became Marston Sicca Rural District, and portions of Campden Rural District and Pebworth Rural District in 1894. In 1931 the county's boundaries with Warwickshire and Worcestershire were realigned, removing the salients from Gloucestershire; in compensation, Gloucestershire gained a number of detached Worcestershire parishes.

- The larger of the pene-exclaves contained Marston Sicca Rural District with six parishes: Clifford Chambers, Dorsington, Marston Sicca, Preston on Stour Welford-on-Avon and Weston-on-Avon; part of Pebworth Rural District, comprising the six parishes of Pebworth, Aston Subedge, Cow Honeybourne, Saintbury, Weston Subedge and Willersey; and part of Campden Rural District comprising the seven parishes of Admington, Chipping Campden, Clopton, Ebrington, Hidcote Bartrim, Mickleton and Quinton.
- The smaller pene-exclave was a detached portion of Campden Rural District with the parishes of Lower Lemington and Todenham.
- There was also a counter-exclave in the county corporate of Gloucester, comprising Gloucester Castle.

Six exclaves were abolished in 1844:

- Little Compton (1). The parish of Little Compton, transferred to Warwickshire.
- Lea Lower (1). The parish of Lea, Herefordshire was divided into the townships of Lee Upper and Lea Lower, the last being in Gloucestershire and containing the parish church. It was transferred to Herefordshire, and the townships made into civil parishes. The parish was united in 1883.
- Minety (1). The parish of Minety, transferred to Wiltshire. This surrounded a small counter-enclave of Wiltshire containing the parish church.
- Shenington (1). The parish of Shenington, transferred to Oxfordshire.
- Sutton-under-Brailes (1). The parish of Sutton-under-Brailes, transferred to Warwickshire.
- Widford (1). The parish of Widford, transferred to Oxfordshire.

=== Hampshire ===
The county had two small exclaves after 1844, and one was abolished then (pre-1844 total 3 legal 3; post-1844 total 2, legal 2):

- Bramshott (1). An exclave of the parish of Bramshott, known as Crouch House Farm, was transferred to the parish of Rogate in Sussex in 1895.
- Steep (1). A three-acre exclave of the parish of Steep, located in Borden Wood in the parish of Chithurst in Sussex, was transferred to the latter parish in 1883. The area consisted of woodland only, with no inhabitants or cultivation.
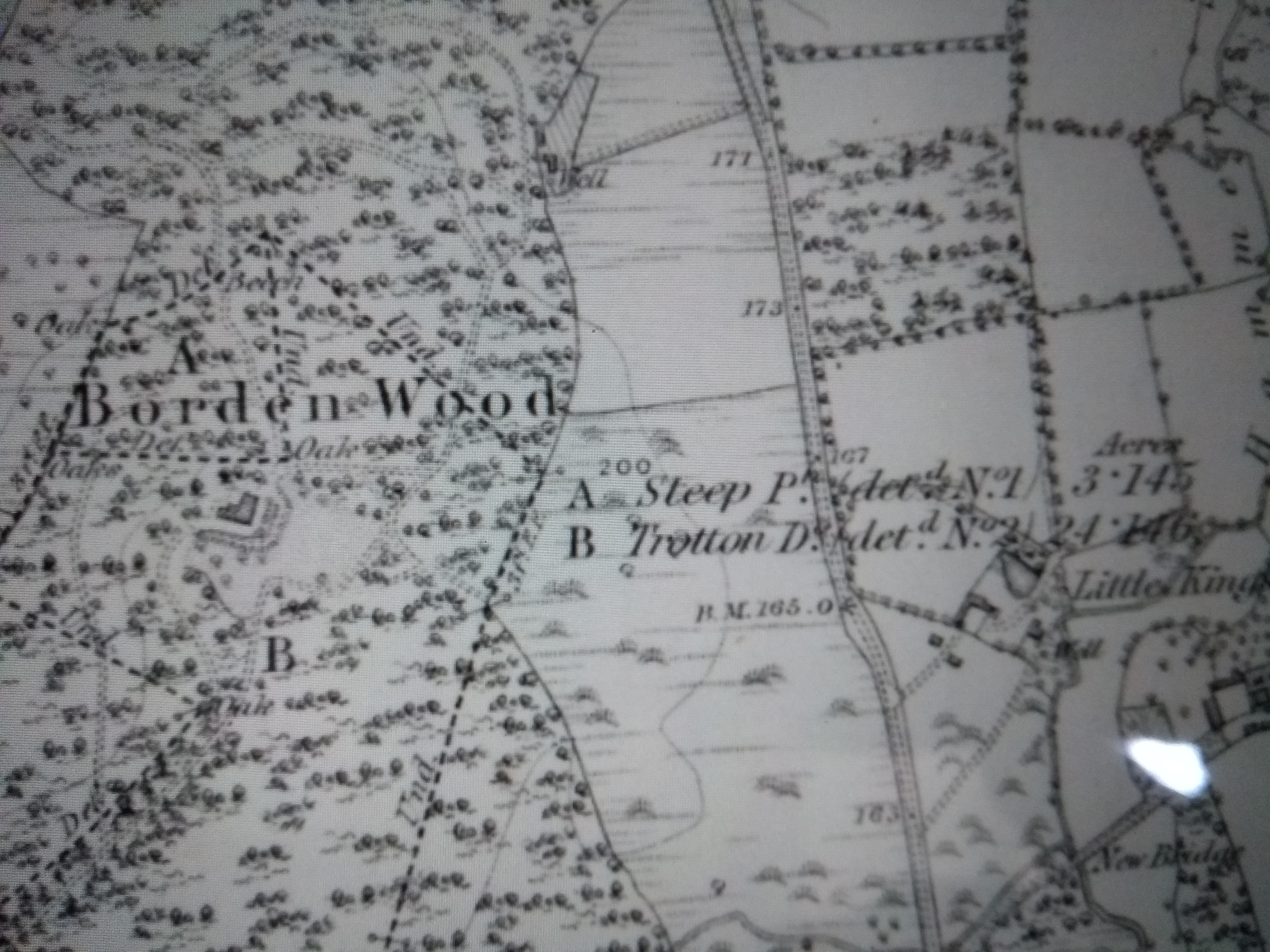
  Hampshire's tiny exclave in a Sussex wood.

A large exclave was abolished in 1844:

- Ambersham (1). This was a tithing of the parish of Steep, and was a narrow strip of land running south from the Surrey border near Haslemere to near Graffham in Sussex. After 1844 it was divided into the civil parishes of South Ambersham and North Ambersham.

=== Herefordshire ===
The county had one exclave after 1844, and three were abolished then (pre-1844 total 5, legal 5; post-1844 total 1, legal 1):

- Ffwddog (1). The parish of Cwmyoy in Monmouthshire included an exclave of Herefordshire called Ffwddog, 2,008 acres (813 hectares) (spelled "Fwthog" by the first Ordnance Survey). This was transferred to Monmouthshire in 1891.

Abolished in 1844:

- Farlow (1). The chapelry of Farlow, in the parish of Stottesdon, transferred to Shropshire.
- Litton and Cascob (1). The township of Litton and Cascob, in the ancient parishes of Cascob and Presteigne, transferred to Radnorshire.
- Rochford (1). The chapelry of Rochford, in the parish of Tenbury, transferred to Worcestershire.
- Crooked Billet (1). A field of three acres (1.2 hectares) in Trelleck parish just north of Devauden, transferred to Monmouthshire.

=== Hertfordshire ===
The county had no exclaves after 1844, and six were abolished then (pre-1844 total 5, legal 2; post-1844 total 0):

- Coleshill (1). The hamlet of Coleshill (in the parish of Amersham), transferred to Buckinghamshire.
- Meppershall (3). The parts of the parish of Meppershall in Hertfordshire east of the village, transferred to Bedfordshire. The largest exclave, which divided the village, contained a small counter-exclave of Bedfordshire (q.v.) on the south side of Fildyke Road near the junction with Chapel Road. The other two exclaves comprised meadows on the west border of the parish, one a long strip and another tiny.
- Pirton (1). One of the five exclaves of the parish of Shillington, Bedfordshire in Hertfordshire contained a tiny counter-exclave of Hertfordshire belonging to Pirton.

=== Huntingdonshire ===
The county had two exclaves after 1844 (pre-1844 total 2, legal 2; post-1844 total 2, legal 2):

- Swineshead (1). The parish of Swineshead was an exclave of the county surrounded by Bedfordshire, 1,278 acres (517 hectares). In 1896, the parish was transferred to Bedfordshire in exchange for the parish of Tilbrook.
- Tetworth (1). The civil parish of Tetworth was in two parts, the southern being an exclave of Huntingdonshire separated from the rest of the county, 730 acres (300 hectares) and the other half of the parish by a salient of Cambridgeshire. This situation remained until 1965, when the county of Huntingdon and Peterborough was formed, and parish and county boundaries were adjusted to remove the detached part. The exclave had been enlarged under the 1844 act by including part of Tetworth previously in Bedfordshire, which was a single irregularly-shaped field in the north-west corner of the exclave north of Biggin Wood. Oddly, the parish church of Everton, Bedfordshire was in this enclave (with half the village) and not in its civil parish. This was because Everton and Tetworth had always remained a single ecclesiastical parish.

=== Kent ===
The county had two riparian semi-exclaves after 1844:

- North Woolwich. The town and parish of Woolwich had two parcels of territory on the north bank of the Thames Estuary, surrounded by Essex. Before the 19th century these were just marshland, but in 1847 North Woolwich railway station was opened in the western, smaller one to give the town a railway route to London via a ferry. This created the settlement of North Woolwich. The two riparian semi-exclaves were transferred to the County of London with the town in 1889. Previously [previous to what?], the boundary between Kent and Essex ran along the middle of the estuary here.

=== Lancashire ===
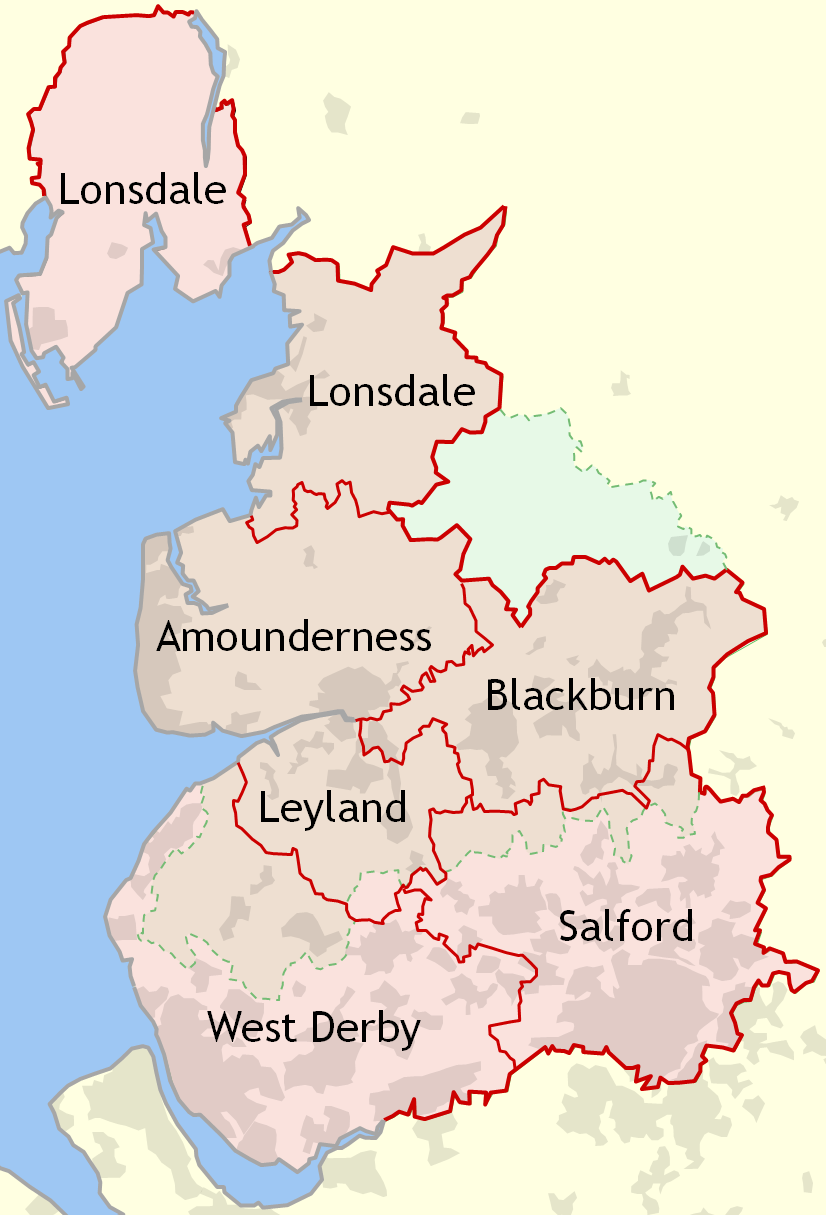
The hundreds of historic Lancashire, showing Lonsdale in two parts, separated by Morecambe Bay. The green outline shows the 1974 administrative Lancashire.

The historic county of Lancashire had no true exclaves, although a large part of it was separated from the rest at high tide and counted as a semi-exclave (total 1):

- Furness (1). The North Lonsdale area of Lancashire, or "Lancashire North of the Sands", was cut off from the main body of Lancashire by Westmorland and Morecambe Bay, and so was regarded as a semi-enclave. However, Morecambe Bay dries out at low tide and an ancient right of way for wheeled traffic runs across it (presently in charge of the King's Guide to the Sands). The area was transferred to Cumbria by the Local Government Act 1972.

Administrative exclave:

- Lees Urban District was from 1889 an exclave of the administrative county of Lancashire, separated from the rest of the county by the County Borough of Oldham (shown within the Salford Hundred in the map to the right), and enclosed on the other side by Saddleworth Urban District in the West Riding of Yorkshire. The urban district was abolished by the Local Government Act 1972, taking effect on 1 April 1974, with its former area transferred to the newly created metropolitan county of Greater Manchester, along with much of Salford Hundred, to form part of the new Metropolitan Borough of Oldham, where it was also joined by Saddleworth.

Riparian semi-exclaves:

- River Mersey. The border with Cheshire ran along the River Mersey, but the river had many meanders and was liable to change its course. This left many portions of both counties on the wrong side of it. Most of the border has been superseded, but a portion remains between the boroughs of Stockport and Tameside south of Denton, and this still illustrates the problem.

=== Leicestershire ===
The county had no exclaves, except sixteen small counter-exclaves in its large enclave of Derbyshire (q.v.) (pre-1844 total 16, legal 0; post-1844 total 16, legal 0):

- Appleby Magna (4).
- Donisthorpe (12).

=== Lincolnshire ===
The county had three exclaves after 1844 (pre-1844 total 3 legal 1; post-1844 total 3, legal 1):

- Misson (3). The parish of Misson was shared with Nottinghamshire, which had the village. Lincolnshire had one main exclave, Misson Springs, with two satellite exclaves of Highwood Farm and Lewes Farm. The latter was only separated from the main exclave by the width of Springs Road. The parish was consolidated within Nottinghamshire in 1886, despite being a riparian semi-exclave cut off from the rest of the county by the River Idle.

=== City of London ===
The City of London has kept its ancient boundaries, which have no exclaves. However, the entire length of Old London Bridge was in its territory, until it was demolished in 1831. Technically this left a short stretch of the River Thames tidal foreshore in Southwark as a riparian semi-exclave of the city, just east of the present London Bridge.

=== Middlesex and the County of London ===
There had been only one historical exclave of the county, abolished before 1844:

- Liberty of St Martin's Le Grand. This had been a medieval college of secular canons, with a collegiate church, situated in the City of London parish of St Leonard, Foster Lane. The college was taken over by Westminster Abbey in 1503 as part of the endowment granted for the upkeep of the Henry VII Chapel, and subsequently was regarded as part of the borough of Westminster up to the Reform Act 1832, and an exclave of Middlesex. This was despite the City of London and Westminster Streets and Post Office Act 1815 (55 Geo. 3. c. xci) annexing the Liberty to the Aldersgate Ward of the City of London when the site was earmarked for a new General Post Office.

When the County of London was constituted in 1889, it was made up of parishes from Kent, Surrey and Middlesex. Whereas Middlesex had no county exclaves, it had several parish exclaves and three of these caused anomalies in the new county's boundaries:

- One Middlesex parish, Clerkenwell, had a detached portion that became an exclave of London surrounded by Middlesex. The exclave comprised a 0.1 mi^{2} (0.3 km^{2}) area of north-central Muswell Hill, and occupied the east side of Colney Hatch Lane from Muswell Hill Broadway as far north as the present Goodwyns Vale. Back then, it was parkland and contained the ancient Mus Well. In the Middle Ages, Clerkenwell Priory had charge of a chapel and shrine here of "Our Lady of Mus Well", hence the exclave. This was absorbed by Middlesex in 1899, having been built over and the well destroyed the previous year (it was at 40 Muswell Road).
- The ancient Middlesex parish of Hornsey had two small exclaves in the south-east corner of the parish of Stoke Newington, which were included in the South Hornsey Local Board in 1865. The formation of the County of London left these as enclaves within it, which were inherited by the South Hornsey Urban District in 1894. Then the whole of South Hornsey passed to the County of London in 1900. One exclave was a narrow strip of land, 5 acres (2.0 hectares), from Newington Green along the west side of Albion Road to just short of Clissold Crescent. The other was an irregular shape of 60.5 acres (24.5 hectares) made up of two quadrilaterals meeting at the junction of Allen Road and Neville Road, one occupying the area bounded by Matthias Road, Milton Road, Allen Road and Cowper Road, the other between Nevill Road and Stoke Newington Road.
- The County of London inherited the two riparian semi-enclaves of North Woolwich from Kent (q.v.), and these were abolished when the Borough of Newham was created in 1965.

=== Monmouthshire ===
The county had no exclaves after 1844, and one was abolished then (pre-1844 total 1, legal 1; post-1844 total 1, legal 1):

- Welsh Bicknor, parish transferred to Herefordshire.

=== Montgomeryshire ===
The county had one exclave after 1844 (pre-1844 total 1 legal 1; post-1844 total 1, legal 1):

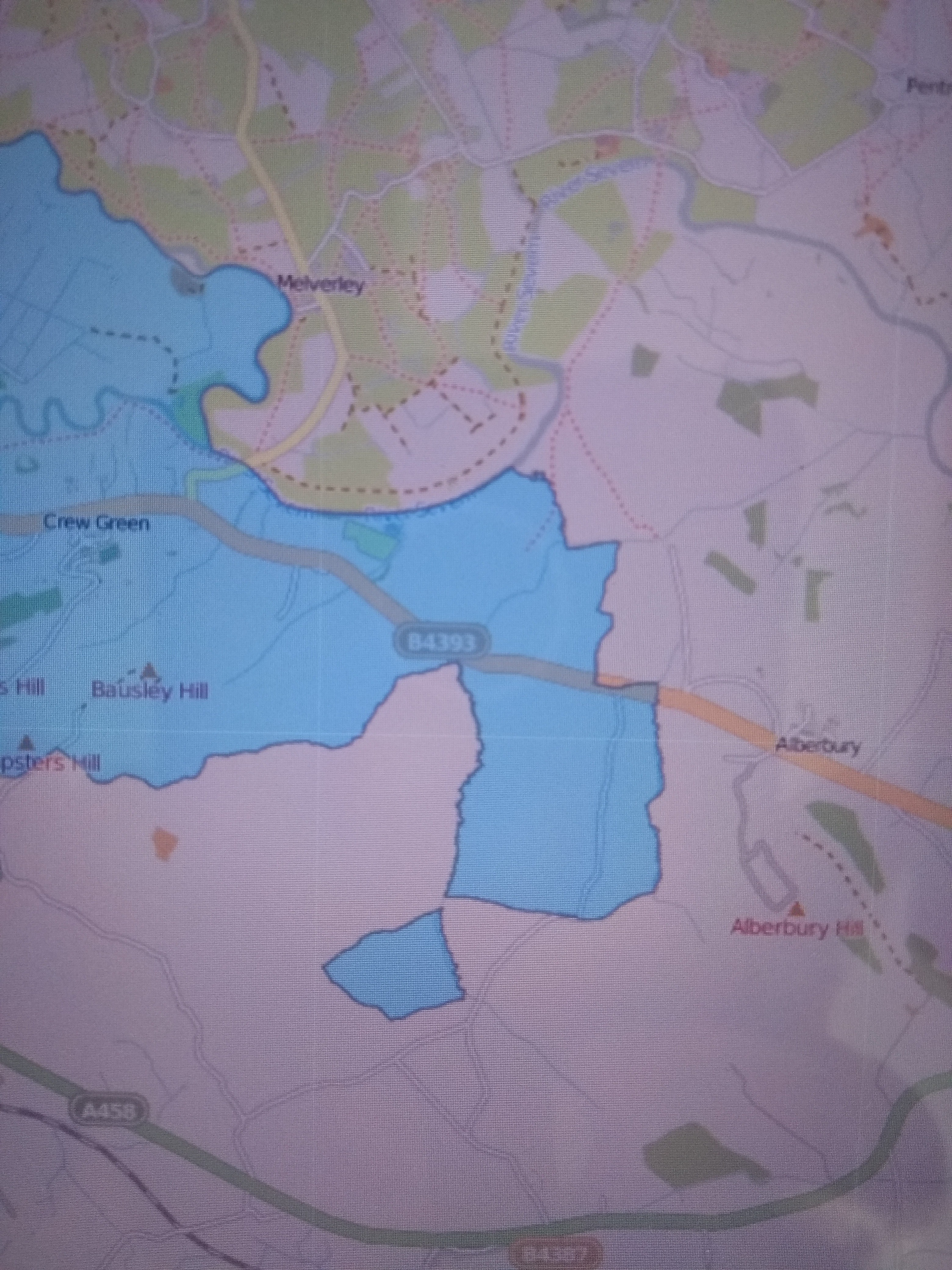
Exclave of Montgomeryshire in England

- Bausley (1). The township of Bausley forms a Welsh salient into Shropshire, and had a small exclave comprising a farm called Stanford which was transferred to the latter county. There was a serious proposal to transfer Bausley to Shropshire in 1887, but the parish exclave was transferred to Wollaston instead. Bausley, including the exclave, remain in the Church of England parish of Alberbury.

Riparian semi-exclaves:

- The border with Shropshire between Llanymynech and Melverley (the Welsh–English border) runs along the River Vyrnwy, but this river meanders at will. Dropped meanders mean that there are six riparian semi-enclaves of Montgomeryshire, and four of Shropshire. These have been left alone. One of the Montgomeryshire semi-exclaves (the second from Llanymenech Bridge) was created after 1887 when the river changed course.

=== Norfolk ===
The county had no exclaves in other counties, and very compact boundaries. However, it did have a counter-enclave:

- Norwich Castle was an enclave of the county of Norfolk within the city of Norwich, which in turn was historically a county corporate and so an enclave within Norfolk. It comprised Norwich Castle and some adjoining territory.

=== Northamptonshire ===
The county had eight small exclaves after 1844 (pre-1844 total 8, legal 1; post-1844 total 8, legal 1):

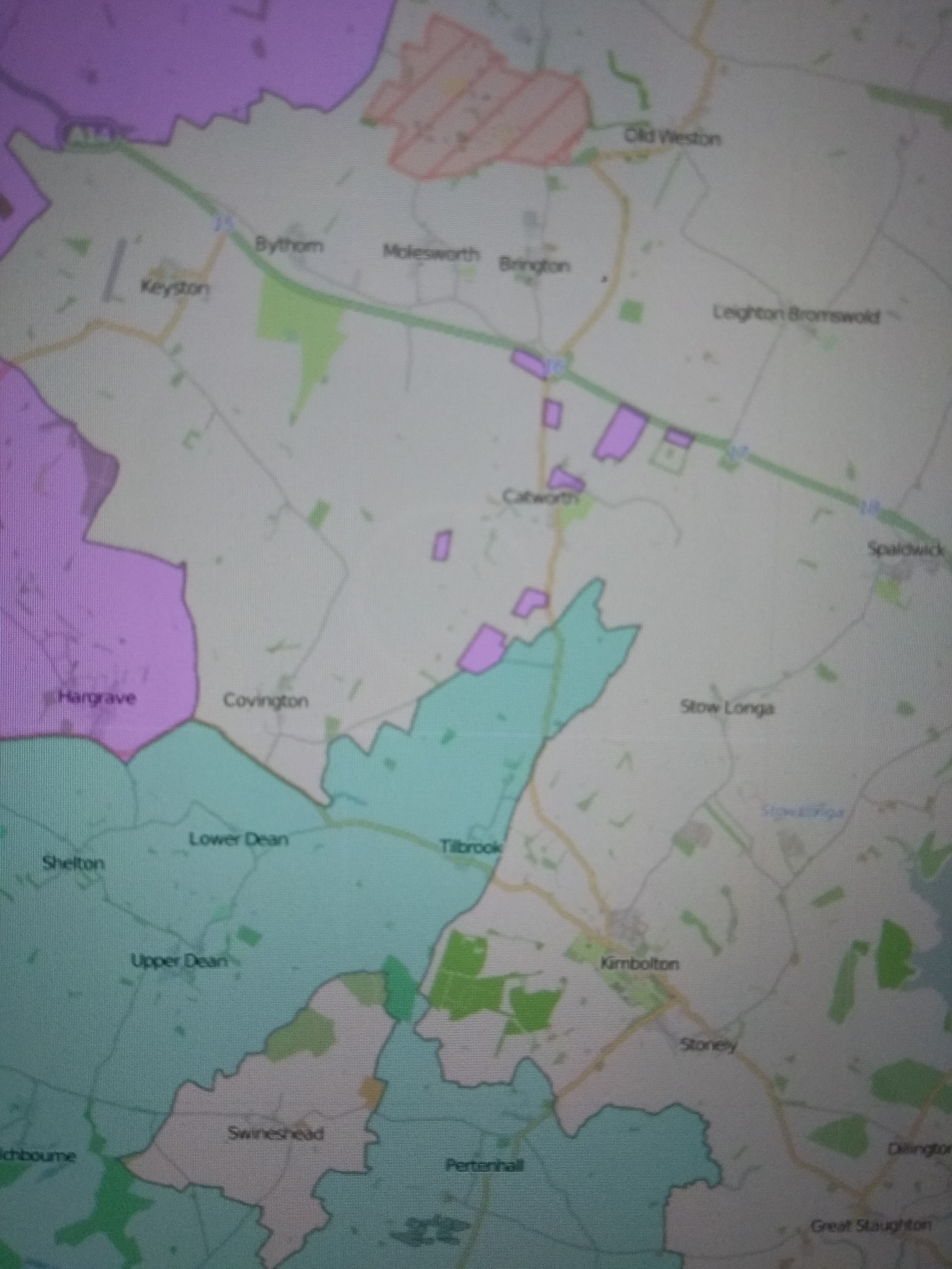
Exclaves of Northamptonshire in Catford, also shows Swineshead exclave of Huntingdonshire. (Historic County Borders Project)

- Great Catworth (8). The parish of Great Catworth in Huntingdonshire had eight small parcels of territory belonging to Northamptonshire. These were thought to have been a property holding by Peterborough Abbey. The parish was consolidated with Little Catworth to make (just) Catworth in 1885.

Pene-exclave:

The parish of Lutton was divided between Northamptonshire and Huntingdonshire until 1886, when it was unified in the former county. Previously, two fields of Lutton Lodge Farm formed a pene-exclave with an isthmus only about two yards wide. The old name was Luddington-in-the-Wold.

=== Northumberland ===
The county had no exclaves, except for the Moot Hall at Newcastle upon Tyne which was the old county administrative headquarters.

=== Nottinghamshire ===
The county had ten exclaves after 1844 (pre-1844 total 10, legal 1; post-1844 total 10, legal 1):

- Auckley (10). The township (now parish) of Auckley is in Yorkshire, but was divided between that county and Nottinghamshire in a complicated manner. The latter had three exclaves of very irregular shape, and seven satellite exclaves making a total of ten. Yorkshire had two counter-exclaves in the largest exclave. The township was united under Yorkshire in 1886.
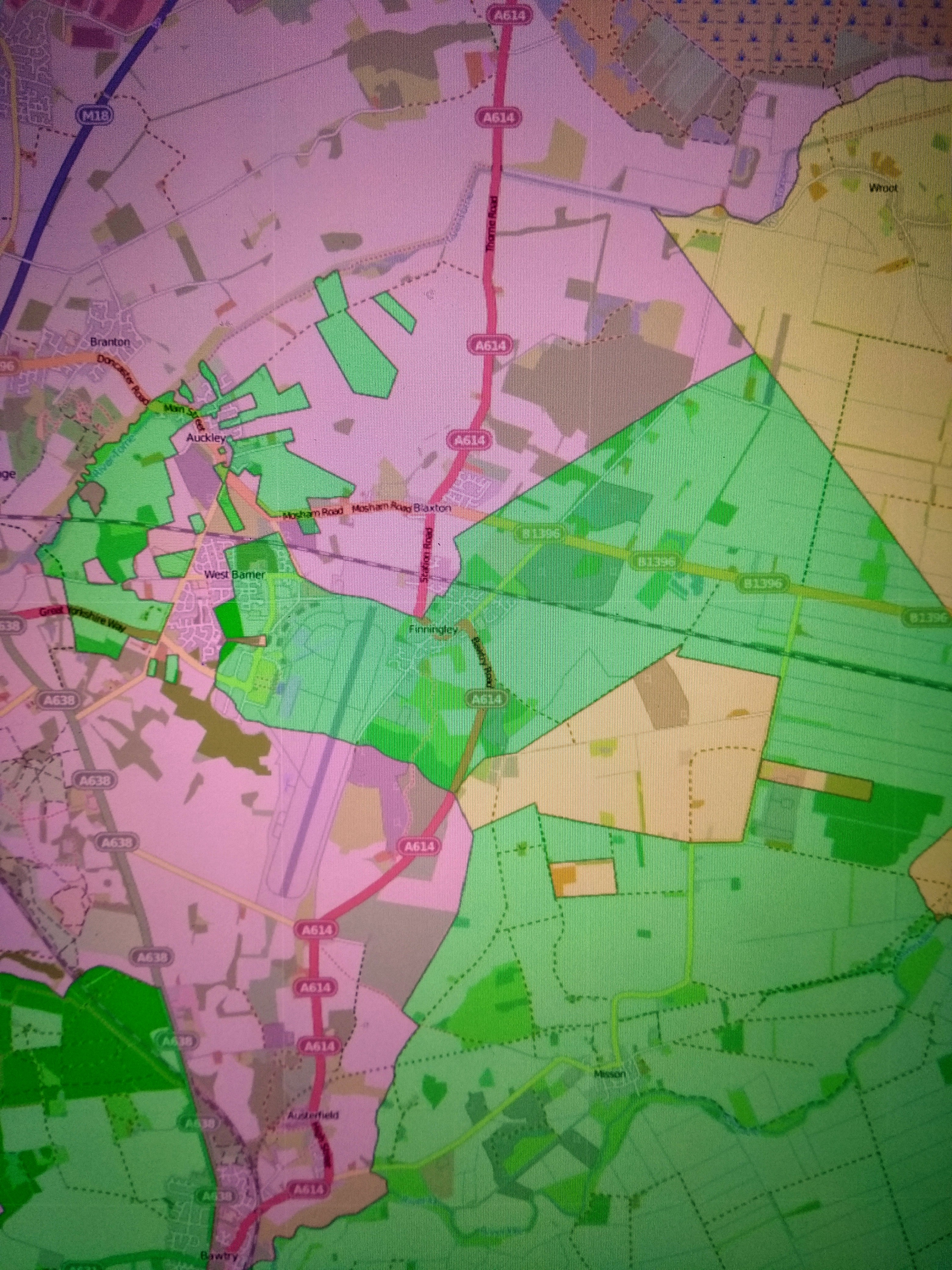
  Nottinghamshire (green), Lincolnshire (orange) and Yorkshire (pink) meeting in confusion (Historic County Borders Project).

Pene-exclave:

- The parish of Broadholme was mostly surrounded by Lincolnshire, and was inaccessible directly from Nottinghamshire. It was transferred to the former county in 1989, despite much local opposition.

Riparian semi-exclave:

- The parish of Misson, Nottinghamshire is a riparian semi-exclave completely cut off from the rest of the county by the River Idle.
- The county corporate of Nottingham contained a counter-exclave which used to be the precincts of Nottingham Castle. This comprised four contiguous extra-parochial areas, known as Castle Enclosure, The Park, Brewhouse Yard and Standard Hill. The exclave was abolished in 1877.

=== Oxfordshire ===
The county had no exclaves after 1844, and four were abolished then (pre-1844 total 4, legal 4; post-1844 total 0):

- Ackhampstead (1). The chapelry of Ackhampstead (in the parish of Lewknor), transferred to Buckinghamshire.
- Boycott (1). The township of Boycott (in the parish of Stowe), transferred to Buckinghamshire.
- Broughton Poggs. (1). Great Lemhill Farm, also a detached portion of the parish of Broughton Poggs south-east of Southrop, transferred to Gloucestershire.
- Lillingstone Lovell (1). The parish of Lillingstone Lovell, transferred to Buckinghamshire.

=== Shropshire ===
The county had no exclaves after 1844, and a total of eleven were abolished then (pre-1844 total 11 legal 1; post-1844 total 0).

- Halesowen (11). The ancient parish of Halesowen, excluding the township of Warley Wigorn in Worcestershire, was a large exclave, transferred to Worcestershire, uniting it with Warley Wigorn. It included the townships of Halesowen proper, Hunnington, Illey, Oldbury, Ridgacre, Romsley and Warley Salop. The area around the last, especially on Barnford Hill south of Langley Green had extremely complicated boundaries. Barnford Hill saw the counties of Shropshire and Worcestershire share out field strips. Worcestershire had twenty-seven counter-exclaves and the Shropshire exclave had ten counter-counter exclaves, both sets including field strips of a fraction of an acre. Four of the Worcester sub-enclaves bordered on Staffordshire.

Riparian semi-exclaves:

- The border with Shropshire between Llanymynech and Melverley (the Welsh-English border) runs along the River Vyrnwy, but this river meanders at will. Dropped meanders mean that there are six riparian semi-enclaves of Shropshire, and four of Montgomeryshire. These have been left alone.

=== Somerset ===
The county had no exclaves after 1844, and one was abolished then (pre-1844 total 1, legal 1; post-1844 total 0):

- Holwell (1). The parish of Holwell, transferred to Dorset.

=== Staffordshire ===
The county had four exclaves after 1844, a fifth briefly in the 20th century (not counted) and one was abolished in 1844 (pre-1844 total 5, legal 3; post-1844 total 3, legal 2):

- Dudley Castle Hill. The extra-parochial territory of Dudley Castle Hill, including Dudley Castle, was anciently part of Seisdon Hundred in Staffordshire. However, it abutted the town of Dudley, itself an exclave of Worcestershire (q.v.), and the castle was a pene-exclave of Staffordshire because the gate opened onto Worcestershire. In 1926 Dudley County Borough had its boundaries extended, making Dudley Castle Hill an exclave in Worcestershire. This lasted only until 1929, three years, when it was annexed.
- Edingale (3). The village of Edingale was divided between Derbyshire and Staffordshire, with townships of the same name belonging to Croxall and Alrewas. Derbyshire had three exclaves, and Stsffordshire three. All were abolished when Edingale civil parish was created in 1936 and put in Staffordshire.
- Rolleston on Dove (1). The parish of Rolleston on Dove had an exclave comprising a single meadow on the River Dove south of Marston on Dove. This was within a riparian pene-exclave of Derbyshire (see below).

One exclave was abolished in 1844:

- Broome and Clent (1). The parishes of Broome and Clent, together transferred to Worcestershire.

Riparian semi-exclaves:

- The River Dove, where it forms the boundary between Derbyshire and Staffordshire, has changed course in many places in between Rocester and its confluence with the River Trent, leaving several riparian semi-enclaves of both counties along it. These have mostly been left alone. Derbyshire has thirteen with another two connected by bridge; Staffordshire twelve, with a further three connected by bridge.

=== Suffolk ===
The county mostly had compact boundaries, no exclaves and one large pene-exclave which survives to the present day:

- Newmarket, Suffolk cannot be accessed directly from the rest of the county by any public right of way, although the isthmus was slightly widened in 1992 so that the boundary now abuts the B1506 road. The pene-exclave also contains the parish of Exning. Before the exclave was enlarged in 1894, the boundary of the town ran along the High Street and the southern part with the railway station was in the Cambridgeshire parish of Woodditton. In 1992, as well as the pene-exclaves isthmus being widened, half of Newmarket Heath and the small village of Landwade were annexed from Cambridgeshire.

=== Surrey ===
The county had compact boundaries, and no exclaves.

Riparian semi-exclave:

- A dropped meander on the River Thames just north of Chertsey Bridge left part of the county on the wrong side of the river at Chertsey Lock. This was called Bos Ait and featured an oxbow lake in 1872, but has been mostly lost to a gravel pit.

=== Sussex ===
The county had no exclaves after 1844, and one was abolished then (pre-1844 total 1, legal 1; post-1844 total 0):

- Bohunt (1). An exclave of the parish of Rogate known as Bohunt west of Liphook, transferred to the parish of Bramshott in Hampshire.

The county had only one pene-exclave, the boundaries being otherwise compact:

- The Sussex portion of the parish of Bramshott was transferred to join the rest in 1894. It comprised a thin strip containing Griggs Green, and a sub-salient containing part of Lowsley Farm

=== Warwickshire ===
The county had one exclave after 1844, and one was abolished then (pre-1844 total 2, legal 2; post-1844 total 1, legal 1):

- Ilmington, Stretton-on-Fosse and Whitchurch (1). The parishes of Ilmington, Stretton-on-Fosse, and Whitchurch formed a large exclave of Warwickshire, separated from the main part of the county by an exclave of four Worcestershire parishes. In 1931 the intervening area of Worcestershire was transferred to Warwickshire, so that the three parishes became joined to the rest of the county.

Abolished in 1844:

- Tutnall and Cobley (1). The township of Tutnall and Cobley (in the parish of Tardebigge), transferred to Worcestershire.

=== Wiltshire ===
The county had no exclaves after 1844, and ten were abolished then (pre-1844 total 10, legal 6; post-1844 total 0):

- Inglesham (1). The parish divided between Berkshire and Wiltshire, and was united in the latter county in 1844. The Berkshire portion contained a small exclave of Wiltshire around the parish church, which was thus eliminated. The original boundary survived for parliamentary purposes into the latter 19th century -including the exclave.
- Kingswood (1). The parish of Kingswood, transferred to Gloucestershire.
- Minety (1). A small counter-enclave within the parish of Minety which was an exclave of Gloucestershire within the county. This contained the parish church, and was abolished when the exclave was transferred to Wiltshire.
- Poulton (1). The parish of Poulton transferred to Gloucestershire.
- Shinfield (2). The parish of Shinfield in Berkshire had two portions forming exclaves of Wiltshire. The larger contained the hamlets of Swallowfield and Riseley, the smaller that of Farley Hill.
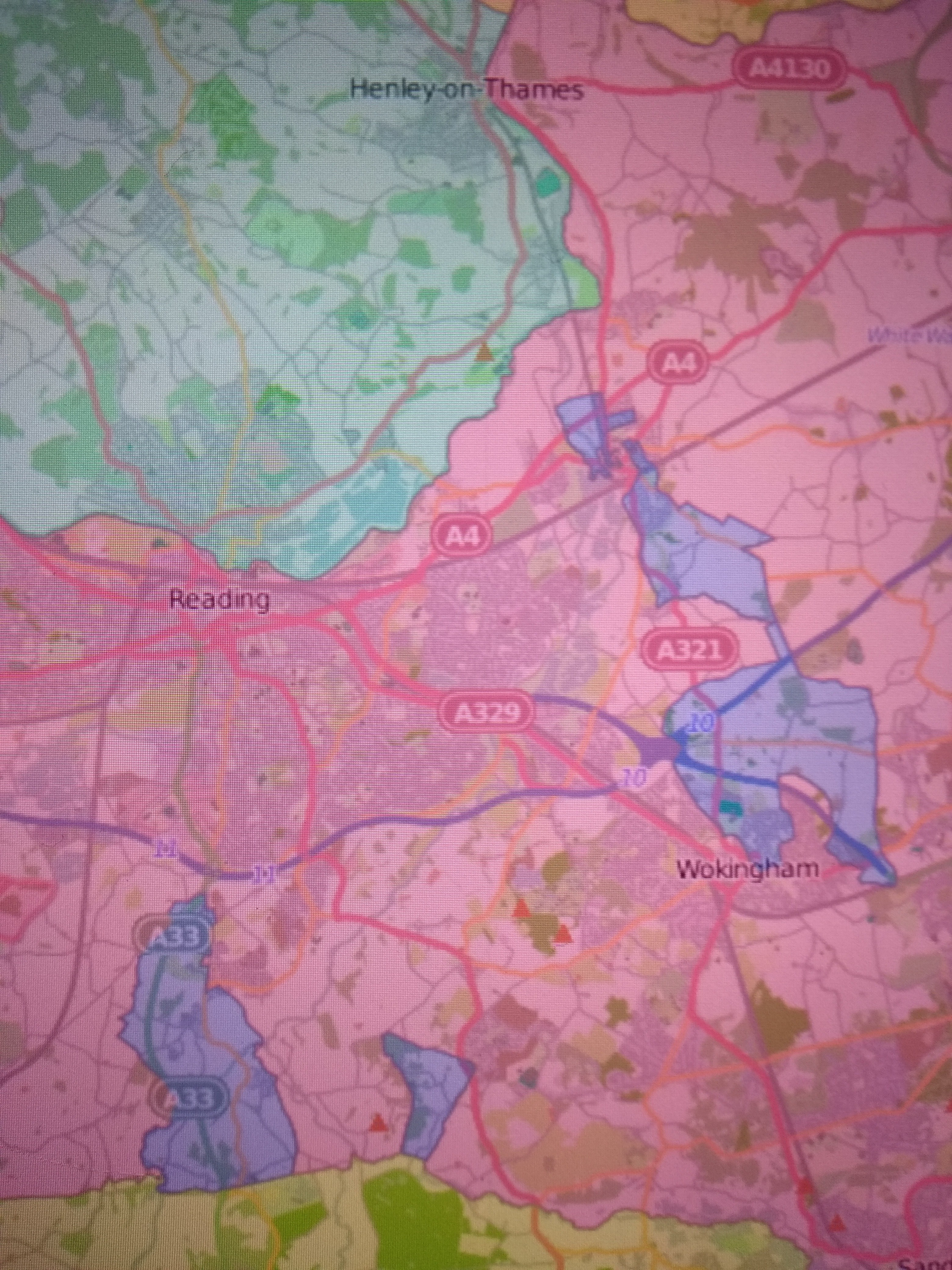
  Exclaves of Wiltshire (lilac) near Reading, Berkshire. (Historic County Borders Project)
- Wokingham and Hurst (4). A large, irregularly shaped exclave took in part of the parochial chapelry of Hurst, Berkshire in the parish of Sonning, and part of the parish of Wokingham. It had a waist the width of a road at Broad Common. It included the east end of Wokingham town with its parish church, and the east end of the village of Twyford. A small, very irregularly shaped satellite exclave occupied the west side of the latter village, and two tiny ones were in its centre. This set of four exclaves, treated as two legal issues, were transferred to Berkshire.

=== Worcestershire ===
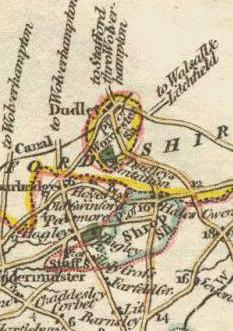
Dudley, shown on an 1814 map as an exclave of Worcestershire surrounded by Staffordshire. Also note the exclave of Shropshire at Halesowen, which was abolished by the Counties (Detached Parts) Act 1844

The historic county was well provided with exclaves. After 1844, six survived with three small satellite exclaves making a total of nine. Twenty-nine were abolished in 1844, although several were tiny (pre-1844 total 38, legal 8; post-1844 total 9, legal 6):

- Alderminster, Shipston-on-Stour, Tidmington and Tredington (1).The parishes of Alderminster, Shipston-on-Stour, Tidmington, and Tredington formed a large exclave which was transferred to Warwickshire in 1931.
- Blockley (1).The parish of Blockley, including Paxford and Aston Magna, was transferred to Gloucestershire in 1931.
- Cutsdean (1). The chapelry of Cutsdean, in the parish of Bredon, became a civil parish in 1866. It was transferred to Gloucestershire in 1931.
- Dudley (2). The town of Dudley survived as an exclave of 3,548 acres (1,436 hectares) until 1966 (augmented 1926), because it was the biggest town in the county and had a greater population than Worcester. It excluded Dudley Castle (see Staffordshire, above) but had a satellite exclave as a strip of woodland on the west side of Dudley Castle Hill. In 1889 the town became a county borough remaining, however, an exclave of Worcestershire for some purposes. In 1926 the exclave was extended by annexing land from the administrative county of Staffordshire for the Priory and Wrens Nest Hill council estates, and this abolished the satellite exclave. In 1966 the county borough absorbed further surrounding areas of Staffordshire, which then became the overall lieutenancy and ceremonial county of Dudley. This abolished the exclave.
- Daylesford (1).The parish of Daylesford was transferred to Gloucestershire in 1931.
- Edvin Loach (3). The parish of Edvin Loach of 510 acres (210 hectares) was transferred to Herefordshire in 1893. It previously had two small satellite exclaves at Cwmwood Farm, transferred to the parish of Collington in 1886.
- Evenlode (1).The parish of Evenlode was transferred to Gloucestershire in 1931. Previously four counties had met at a point marked by the Four Shire Stone, but afterwards only Gloucestershire, Warwickshire and Oxfordshire did.

Two larger exclaves were abolished in 1844, and twenty-seven small ones:

- Alstone and Little Washbourne (1). The hamlets of Alstone and Little Washbourne together, both in the parish of Overbury, transferred to Gloucestershire.
- Church Icomb (1). That half of the parish of Icomb (older spelling Iccomb) called Church Icomb, transferred to Gloucestershire to join the portion already in the county called Westward Icomb. The village had been divided.
- Halesowen (27). The ancient parish of Halesowen was a large exclave of Shropshire, transferred to Worcestershire. This act abolished twenty-seven counter-exclaves within it, including three tiny field strips.

Pene-exclaves:

The 1931 boundary re-ordering abolished two pene-exclaves comprising individual parishes, by annexing neighbouring areas from Gloucestershire:

- Church Honeybourne.
- Sedgeberrow.

A third was annexed by Gloucestershire:

- Teddington.

=== Yorkshire ===
The county had two exclaves after 1844 (pre-1844 total 2, legal 0; post-1844 total 2, legal 0):

- Auckley (2). The only exclaves that Yorkshire had were two small counter-exclaves at Auckley, within an exclave of Nottinghamshire (q.v.). One comprised Insley Plantation, the other was two fields of a farm called Hayfield. These were abolished in 1886, when the township was united in Yorkshire.

== See also ==
- Counties (Detached Parts) Act 1844
- Parliamentary Boundaries Act 1832
