= Campden Rural District =

Rural district in Gloucestershire, England

Coordinates: 52.05°N 1.76°W

Campden
- Area
  - 1911: 23,726 acres (96.02 km^{2})
  - 1931: 37,658 acres (152.40 km^{2})
- Population
  - 1901: 5,441
  - 1931: 8,299
- History
  - Created: 1894
  - Abolished: 1935
  - Succeeded by: North Cotswold Rural District, Stratford-on-Avon Rural District
- Status: Rural district
  - HQ: Shipston on Stour

Campden was, from 1894 to 1935, a rural district in the administrative county of Gloucestershire, England. The district lay on the north-eastern boundary of Gloucestershire, and consisted of three separate areas nearly surrounded by the counties of Warwickshire and Worcestershire. The county and district boundaries were simplified in 1931 and the district was abolished in 1935.

== Formation ==
The rural district was created by the Local Government Act 1894 from that part of Shipston on Stour Rural Sanitary District which lay in Gloucestershire. The remainder of Shipston RSD became Shipston on Stour Rural District in Worcestershire (Warwickshire from 1 April 1931). The rural district was named after Chipping Campden and was governed by a directly elected rural district council (RDC), which replaced the rural sanitary authority that had comprised the poor law guardians for the area. Campden RDC continued to hold its meetings in the offices of Shipston Poor Law Union, outside the district.

== Boundaries and constituent parishes ==
The rural district lay on the edge of three counties with very irregular boundaries, including a number of detached parishes.

The district initially consisted of two parts: Seven civil parishes formed part of a salient of Gloucestershire surrounded by Warwickshire and Worcestershire:

- Admington
- Chipping Campden
- Clopton
- Ebrington
- Hidcote Bartrim
- Mickleton
- Quinton

Three parishes formed an area to the south, separated from the main part of the district by the Worcestershire parish of Blockley:

- Batsford
- Bourton-on-the-Hill
- Moreton-in-Marsh

A further two parishes lay to the east:

- Lower Lemington
- Todenham

=== Boundary changes and abolition ===
In February 1930 Warwickshire County Council made an application under the Local Government Act 1888 for an alteration of the county's boundary. The council sought to annex the parishes of Admington and Quinton along with the entire Marston Sicca Rural District. Following the coming into force of the Local Government Act 1929 later in the year, county councils gained the power to adjust boundaries by negotiation, subject to ministerial approval. In December 1930, following a public inquiry conducted in Cheltenham, the Minister for Health approved a scheme to transfer a number of parishes between Gloucestershire, Warwickshire, and Worcestershire. The alterations required the promotion of a private parliamentary bill, which was approved by the House of Commons in February 1931, and came into force on 1 April 1931.

The Act added five parishes to Campden RD: these were the Worcestershire parish of Blockley and four parishes from the abolished Pebworth Rural District: Aston Subedge, Saintbury, Weston Subedge and Willersey.

The district was finally abolished in 1935 and its area redistributed. The bulk of the district was merged with Stow on the Wold urban and rural districts to form the new North Cotswold Rural District. Three parishes in the north of the district, Admington, Clopton and Quinton, were transferred to Warwickshire and to Stratford on Avon Rural District.
