= Marston Sicca Rural District =

Rural district in Gloucestershire between 1894 and 1931

Coordinates: 52.136°N 1.777°W

Marston Sicca
- Area
  - 1911: 8,823 acres (35.71 km^{2})
  - 1931: 8,823 acres (35.71 km^{2})
- Population
  - 1901: 1,485
  - 1931: 1,728
- History
  - Created: 1894
  - Abolished: 1931
  - Succeeded by: Stratford-on-Avon Rural District
- Status: Rural district
  - HQ: Stratford-upon-Avon

Marston Sicca was, from 1894 to 1931, a rural district in the administrative county of Gloucestershire, England. The district formed part of a salient of Gloucestershire nearly surrounded by Warwickshire and Worcestershire. In 1931 the boundaries of the three counties were adjusted. The rural district was abolished and its area transferred to Warwickshire.

== Formation ==
The rural district was created by the Local Government Act 1894 from the part of Stratford on Avon Rural Sanitary District in Gloucestershire. The remainder of Stratford RSD became Stratford-on-Avon Rural District in Warwickshire. The rural district was governed by a directly elected rural district council (RDC), which replaced the rural sanitary authority that had comprised the poor law guardians for the area. Marston Sicca RDC continued to hold its meetings in the offices of Stratford Poor Law Union, outside the district.

== Parishes ==
The district comprised six civil parishes:

- Clifford Chambers
- Dorsington
- Marston Sicca
- Preston on Stour
- Welford-on-Avon
- Weston-on-Avon

== Abolition ==
In February 1930 Warwickshire County Council made an application under the Local Government Act 1888 for an alteration of the county's boundary. The council sought to annex the entire Marston Sicca RD along with the parishes of Admington and Quinton in the neighbouring Campden Rural District. With the coming into force of the Local Government Act 1929 later in the year, county councils gained the power to adjust boundaries by negotiation, subject to ministerial approval. Following a public inquiry in Cheltenham, the Minister for Health approved a scheme to transfer parishes between Gloucestershire, Warwickshire and Worcestershire in December 1930. The alterations required the promotion of a private parliamentary bill, which was approved by the House of Commons in February 1931. The Provisional Orders Confirmation (Gloucestershire Warwickshire and Worcestershire) Act, 1931 came into force on 1 April 1931. The six parishes were transferred to Warwickshire and to Stratford Rural District.
