= Pebworth Rural District =

Former local government area in the UK

Coordinates: 51.991°N 1.945°W

Pebworth
- Area
  - 1911: 17,326 acres (70.12 km^{2})
  - 1921: 17,326 acres (70.12 km^{2})
- Population
  - 1901: 2,944
  - 1921: 3,239
- History
  - Created: 1894
  - Abolished: 1931
  - Succeeded by: Campden Rural District, Evesham Rural District
- Status: Rural district
  - HQ: Evesham

Pebworth was, from 1894 to 1931, a rural district in the administrative county of Gloucestershire, England. The district consisted of four parts, divided from each other by a section of Worcestershire.

== Formation ==
The rural district was created by the Local Government Act 1894 from the part of Evesham Rural Sanitary District in Gloucestershire. The remainder of Evesham RSD became Evesham Rural District in Worcestershire. The rural district was named after the village of Pebworth and was governed by a directly elected rural district council (RDC), which replaced the rural sanitary authority that had comprised the poor law guardians for the area. Pebworth RDC continued to hold its meetings in the offices of Evesham Poor Law Union, outside the district.

== Boundaries and constituent parishes ==
The district consisted of ten parishes in four distinct parts:

To the north

- Pebworth

To the east:

- Aston Subedge
- Cow Honeybourne
- Saintbury
- Weston Subedge
- Willersey

To the south:

- Aston Somerville
- Childs Wickham
- Hinton on the Green

To the south west:

- Ashton under Hill

=== Abolition ===
Following the coming into force of the Local Government Act 1929, county councils gained the power to adjust boundaries by negotiation, subject to ministerial approval. After a public inquiry in Cheltenham, the Minister for Health approved a scheme to transfer parishes between Gloucestershire, Warwickshire and Worcestershire in December 1930. The alterations required the promotion of a private parliamentary bill, which was approved by the House of Commons in February 1931, and came into force on 1 April 1931.

The Act resulted in the abolition of Pebworth Rural district and its redistribution among neighbouring districts in Gloucestershire and Worcestershire:

- Aston Subedge, Saintbury, Weston Subedge and Willersley were added to Campden Rural District in Gloucestershire.
- The remaining six parishes (Ashton under Hill, Aston Somerville, Childs Wickham, Cow Honeybourne, Hinton on The Green and Pebworth) were transferred to Evesham Rural District in Worcestershire.
