= Wimpstone =

Wimpstone may refer to:

- Wimpstone, Warwickshire, a hamlet in England
- Wimpstone, Devon, an ancient name of the manor Whympston in England
