= Weston-sub-Edge hoard =

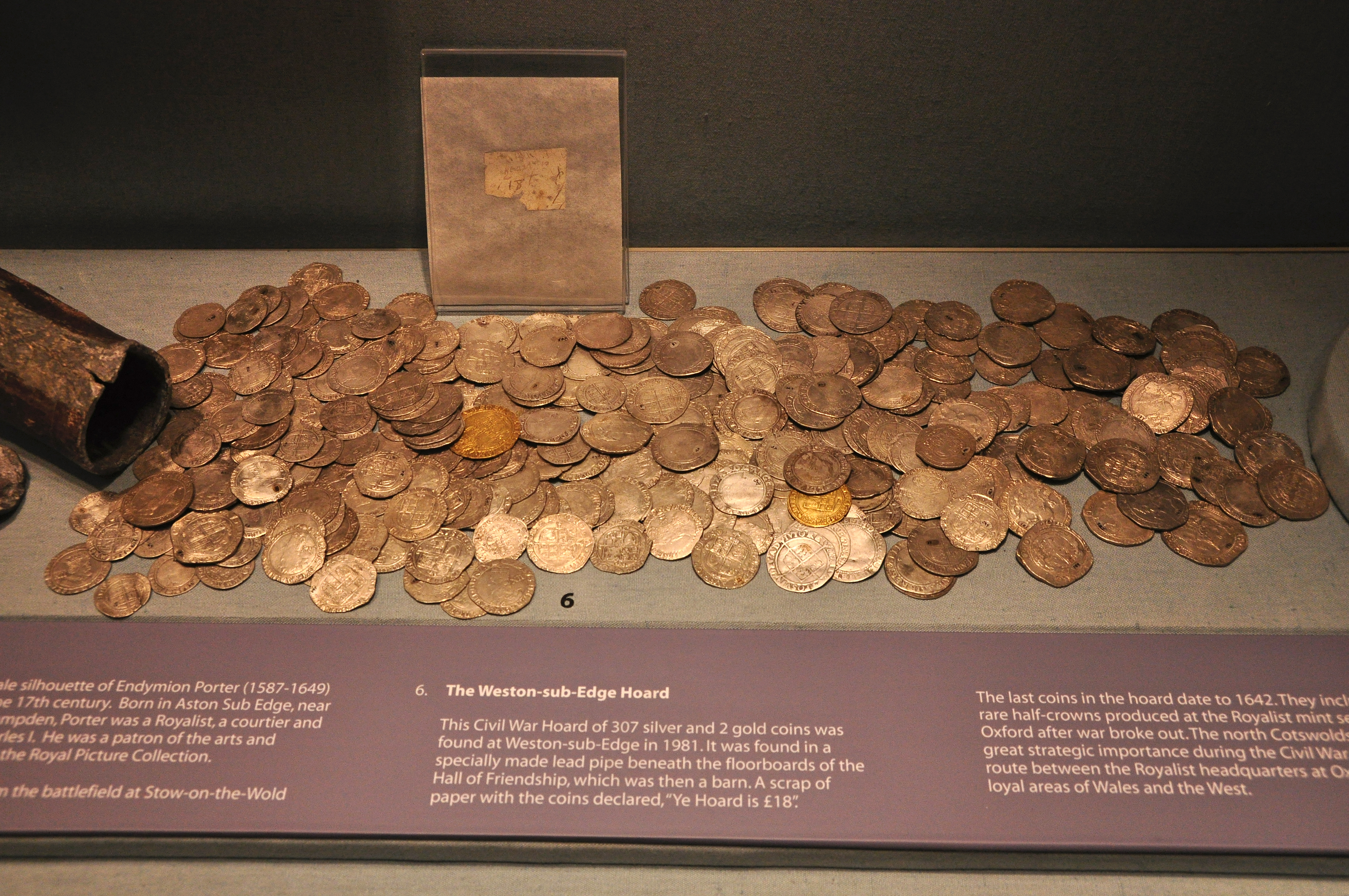
- Created: 17th century
- Period/culture: Post-Medieval period
- Discovered: 1981; Weston-sub-Edge, Gloucestershire
- Present location: Corinium Museum

The Weston-sub-edge hoard is a Civil War coin hoard comprising 309 coins and a lead pipe container from Weston-Sub-Edge in Gloucestershire, England.

== Discovery ==
The hoard was found in 1981 in a former barn, then used as a village hall, in Weston-sub-Edge. The lead pipe was discovered approximately 2 feet (0.61 m) beneath the ground surface in a pit that had been dug for the building of a stanchion to support the roof. The hoard was located in the central position of the building, aligned with the roof structures of the original 17th-Century structure.

== Contents ==
The hoard was contained with a lead pipe which was sealed at both ends. It measured 270 mm in length with a 55 mm diameter. The pipe contained 309 coins, of which 307 were silver and 2 were gold, and a scrap of paper with writing on it. The paper read "hoard is £18", though the total face-value of the hoard from its coins was £17, 13 shillings, and sixpence.

The coins within the hoard ranged from the reigns of Edward VI to Charles I of England and the latest coin in the hoard dates to 1643. There are 6 coins of Edward VI, 3 of Philip and Mary, 107 of Elizabeth I, 36 of James I, and 157 of Charles I.

== Acquisition and display ==
The hoard was declared as Treasure trove in September 1981 and subsequently acquired by the Corinium Museum.
