= The Priory, Pebworth =

Coordinates: 52.114861°N 1.794308°W

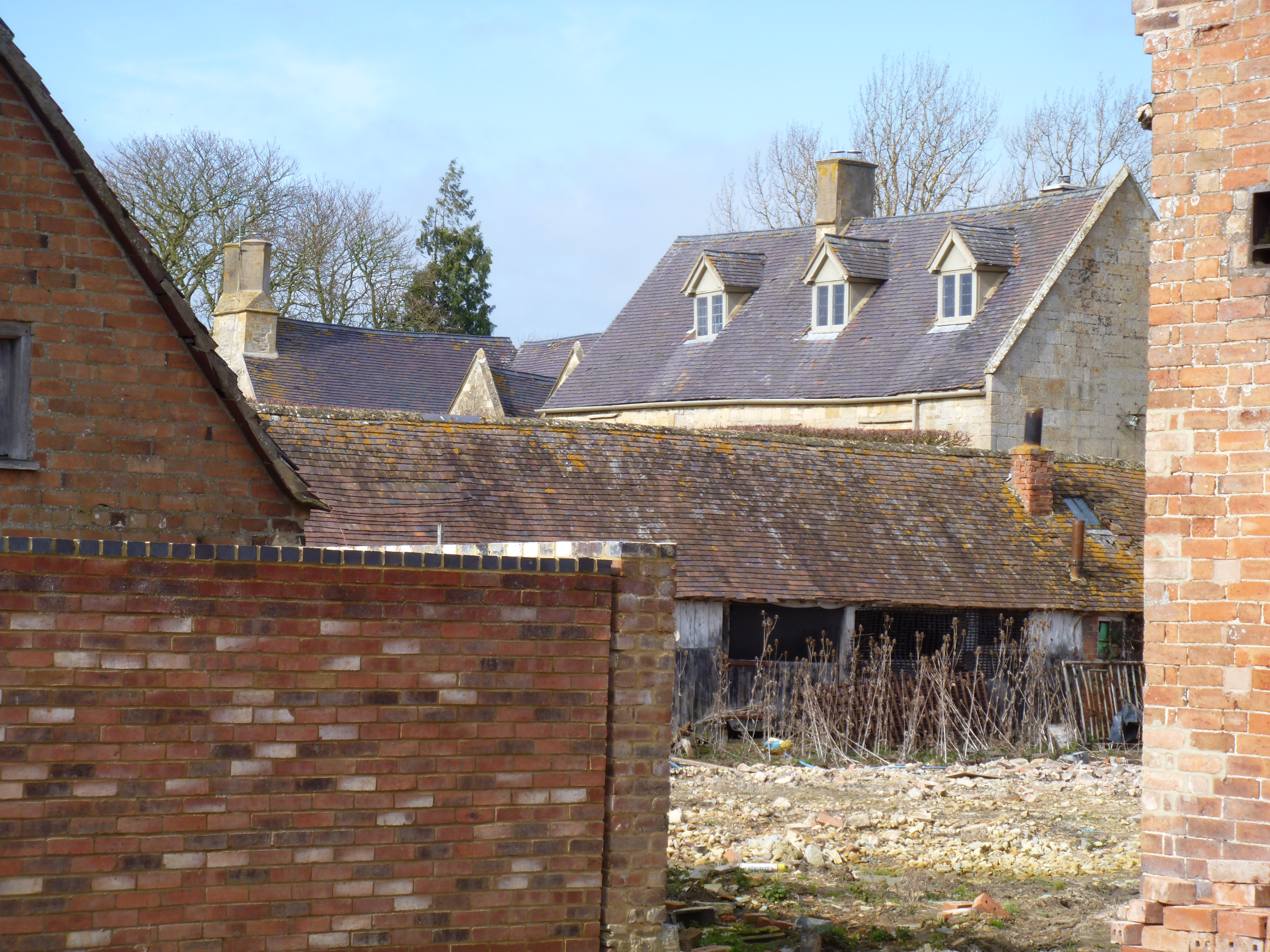
The Priory, Pebworth

The Priory, Pebworth (Broad Marston Priory) is a listed building in the village of Pebworth, in Worcestershire, England. The site is associated with Evesham Abbey.

== Description ==
Formerly known as Broad Marston Priory, the present building was primarily built in the 17th and 18th centuries around an earlier building. It is a large house built from Cotswold and blue lias stone with plain tiled roofs. The west range was built in the mid-17th century with the earlier structure attached at the west end. This part is built from blue lias, although timber framing is exposed on the north gable. Below that are leaded windows, "triple above, triple below and triple with top lights above". There are paired diagonal chimney stacks at the south end as are a coped parapet and two shallow gables. The main part uses Cotswold stone. A two-storey rear wing built from blue ilas projects from the west range. The two-story east range has an attic and two parallel roofs with its south face projecting forward of the adjoining range. The range uses Cotswold stone; it has a chimney stack on the ridge and a coped gable on its eastern face.

The interior has a panelled entrance hall with a stone Tudor-era arched fireplace. There is a very large curved arched inglenook in the west-end room. A well-preserved, 17-century, open-well staircase with a moulded rail is located in the south-west corner of the east range; its newels have pryamidal caps.
