= Pebworth =

Village in Worcestershire, England

Coordinates: 52.119°N 1.810°W

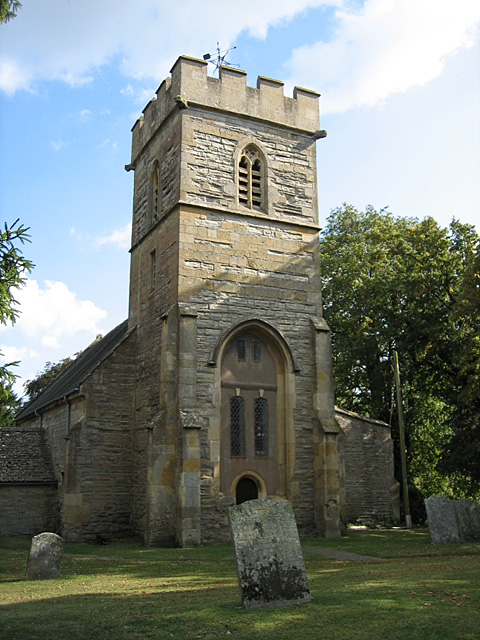
- Pebworth Church is at the west end of the village

- Location within Worcestershire
- OS grid reference: SP129469
- Civil parish: Pebworth
- District: Wychavon
- Shire county: Worcestershire
- Region: West Midlands
- Country: England
- Sovereign state: United Kingdom
- Post town: STRATFORD-UPON-AVON
- Postcode district: CV37
- Police: West Mercia
- Fire: Hereford and Worcester
- Ambulance: West Midlands

Pebworth is a village and civil parish in the county of Worcestershire, lying about 5 miles north-north-west of the town of Chipping Campden in Gloucestershire. Until 1931, the parish – which includes the hamlet of Broad Marston – was itself also in Gloucestershire, as part of Pebworth Rural District. Pebworth is bordered to the north and north-east by the parishes of Dorsington and Long Marston, which are today in Warwickshire.

The Priory of Pebworth is a Grade II listed building.

== History ==
The name Pebworth derives from the Old English Peobbaworð meaning 'Peobba's enclosure'.

Pebworth is mentioned in the Domesday Book

"Hugh de Grandmesnil holds Pebworth. There are two hides and one virgate. Two thegns held it as two manors. There are three ploughs and one villan and one bordar and seven slaves. The same Hugh holds Broad Marston. There are two hides."

Pebworth is known as one of the Shakespeare villages. William Shakespeare is said to have joined a party of Stratford folk which set itself to outdrink a drinking club at Bidford-on-Avon, and as a result of his labours in that regard to have fallen asleep under the crab tree of which a descendant is still called Shakespeare's Tree. When morning dawned his friends wished to renew the encounter but he wisely said "No I have drunk with “Piping Pebworth, Dancing Marston, Haunted Hillboro’, Hungry Grafton, Dodging Exhall, Papist Wixford, Beggarly Broom and Drunken Bidford” and so, presumably, I will drink no more. The story is said to date from the 17th century but of its truth or of any connection of the story or the verse to Shakespeare there is no evidence.

== Pebworth bells ==
St Peter's Church has large ring of ten bells which is unusual for a small rural church. A closed-circuit television camera in the belfry, enables the movement of the bells to be seen in real time view on a monitor in the ringing chamber.

== Morris dancing ==
An active Morris dancing side has existed in Pebworth since early 1979. The side first performed in public on 16 June 1979 to mark the 25th anniversary of Pebworth Village Hall. The side was taught basic Cotswold Morris dance by the Traditional Ilmington Morris Men.
