= Whitchurch, Warwickshire =

Hamlet in Warwickshire, England

Coordinates: 52.134°N 1.69°W

Whitchurch is a parish and a small hamlet lying on the left bank of the River Stour in Warwickshire, England, some four miles south-south-east of the town of Stratford-upon-Avon.

== Hamlet ==
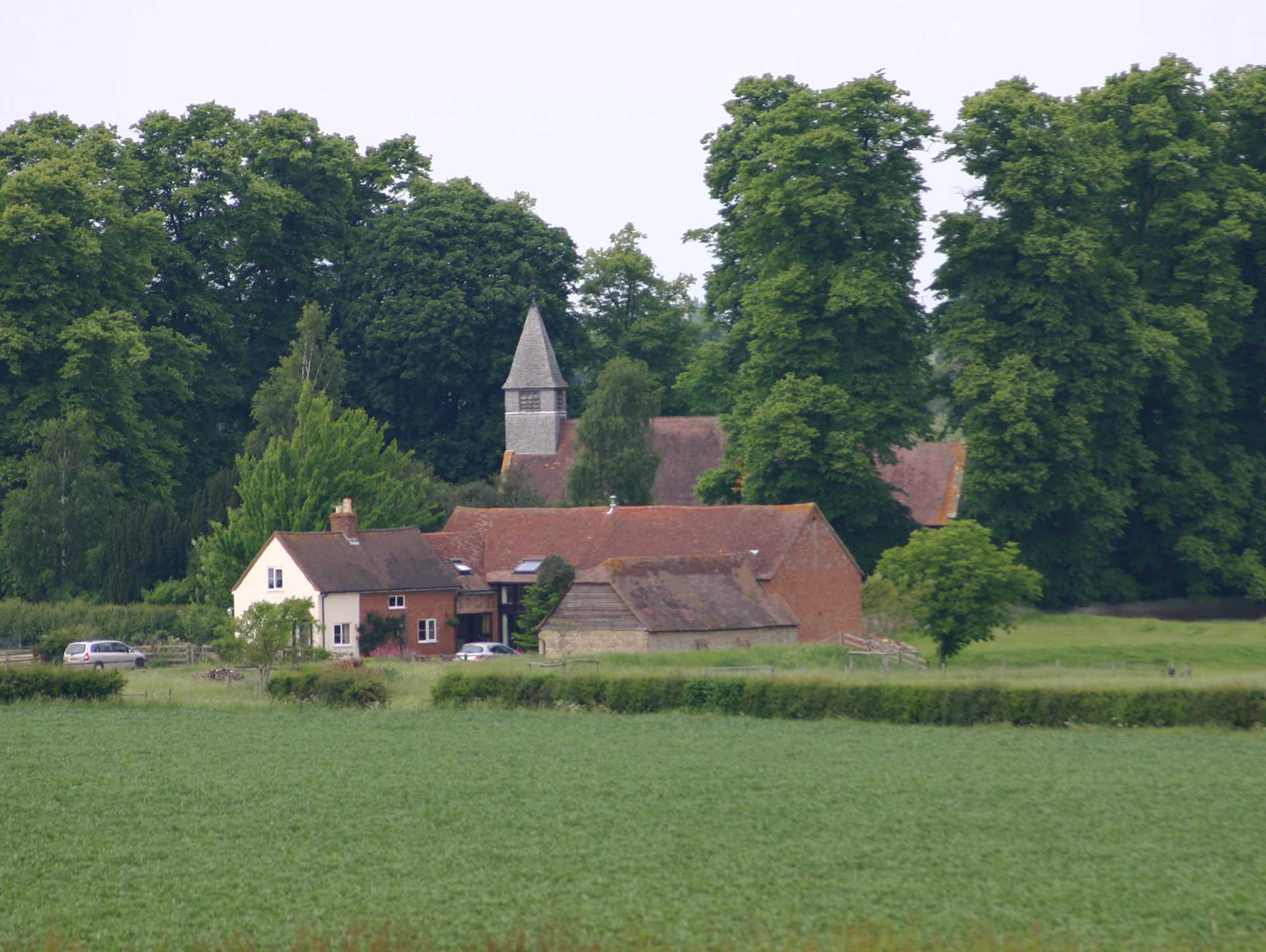
The church at Whitchurch

The population at the 2011 census was 174. Consisting today of just five properties with a total population (in 2007) of 19, it occupies the site of an earlier, larger village which was depopulated in the 15th and 16th centuries as the result of land clearance schemes carried out by the then lords of the manor. A Norman church survives, now standing alone in the middle of fields, and the medieval village's fish ponds are still visible today when the river floods.

== Parish ==
Until 1931, the parish of Whitchurch – which includes the larger settlements of Wimpstone and Crimscote – formed (together with the parishes of Ilmington and Stretton-on-Fosse) a detached part of Warwickshire, separated from the rest of the county by an exclave of Worcestershire. John Marius Wilson's Imperial Gazetteer of England and Wales described the parish in 1870–72 thus:

WHITCHURCH, a parish in Stratford-on-Avon district, Warwick; 4 miles SE of Milcote r. station, and 5¼ SSE of Stratford. Post town, Stratford-on-Avon. Acres, 1,942. Real property, £3,971. Pop., 234. Houses, 50. The manor belongs to J. R. West, Esq. The living is a rectory in the diocese of Worcester. Value, £287.* Patron, J. R. West, Esq. Charities, £8

=== Notable programmes filmed in Whitchurch ===
From 1997 to 2001, the British children's television series Teletubbies created for the BBC was filmed at Sweet Knowle Farm in Wimpstone, a village and area of farmland in the civil parish of Whitchurch.

After too many fans of the show trespassed to see the sighting of the "Tubbytronic Superdrome", the owner of Sweet Knowle Farm, Rosemary Harding, was tired of the constant procedure and decided to deconstruct the hills around designed for the set and take out the superdrome and flood the remains underwater.

“People were jumping fences and crossing cattle fields. We’re glad to see the back of it.”

— Rosemary Harding, Sweet Knowle Aquatics

A reboot of Teletubbies was commissioned in 2015, but is now filmed at Twickenham Studios in West London.

== See also ==
- List of county exclaves in England and Wales 1844–1974
