= Weston-sub-Edge =

Village in Gloucestershire, England

Coordinates: 52.068°N 1.817°W

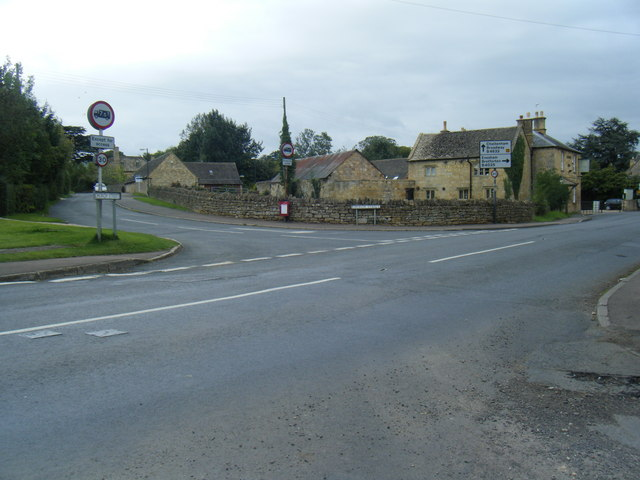
- Church Street, Weston-sub-Edge

- Location within Gloucestershire
- Population: 431 (2011)
- OS grid reference: SP126412
- Civil parish: Weston Subedge
- District: Cotswold
- Shire county: Gloucestershire
- Region: South West
- Country: England
- Sovereign state: United Kingdom
- Post town: CHIPPING CAMPDEN
- Postcode district: GL55 6
- Dialling code: 01386
- Police: Gloucestershire
- Fire: Gloucestershire
- Ambulance: South Western
- UK Parliament: North Cotswolds

Weston-sub-Edge (also known as Weston Subedge) is a village in Gloucestershire, England.

== History ==
This Cotswold village, recorded in the Domesday Book, lies at the foot of Dover's Hill. Named after Robert Dover who organised his ‘Olimpick’ Games there from 1612, it is a well-known beauty spot with extensive views over the surrounding countryside. The Cotswold Olimpick Games, held annually, were revived in 1966. The Bowling Club, formed in 1987, has adopted certain features – their blazer badge is the silver castle (presented then as a prize in some events) while Robert Dover can be seen on the men's ties. The designs are taken from the frontispiece to the “Annalia Dubrensia”, a book of poems written in praise of Robert Dover and published in 1636. The hill was gifted to The National Trust in 1928 and lies within the Cotswolds AONB.

The Romans occupied Weston from the 2nd Century AD, a date based on coins and pottery found in the village. Their Ryknild Street (now called Buckle Street) forms the parish boundary with Saintbury and provided a link with Watling Street and The Fosse Way. Weston, said to have been a station for the Imperial Post, lies roughly halfway between Alcester and Slaughter Bridge, near Bourton-on-the-Water, where Ryknild joins the Fosse. There are three listed Romano-British sites in the village, including one just below the Lynches Wood. It is said that the Romans grew their vines on the clearly defined terraces there. Not far from the hill is the Kiftsgate Stone, the stone pillar marking the Kiftsgate Hundred. It is an ancient monument. Here in Saxon times, the Court of the Hundred met and public announcements were proclaimed. The Stone can be seen on the boundary of Weston Park, almost 200 acres of ancient woodland, first sold from the Giffard Estate in 1610. It still remains in private hands. A boundary stone at the south end of the parish was erected in the 18th century and has been designated as a listed building.

The manor house, next to the church, was built in the late 17th century. The village has some stone houses and a public house, called the Seagrave Arms which was built in the 17th century. In 1981 a Civil War coin hoard (the Weston-sub-Edge hoard) comprising 309 coins sealed in a lead pipe was found in a building then used as the village hall. The school, built in 1852, was closed in 1985, and the small post office closed in 2008.

Weston-sub-Edge railway station is a disused station on the Honeybourne Line from Stratford-upon-Avon to Cheltenham which served the village between 1904 and 1960.

== Name ==
There are several variants of the name. The Domesday Book refers to Westone, but the Ordnance Survey currently use the spelling Weston Subedge, and that is the spelling used by the government in its statutory instruments. However the Parish Council now uses the hyphenated version.

The hyphenated version appeared on all of the railway timetables when the Honeybourne Line was active, as is shown in the Imperial Gazetteer of England and Wales of 1870–1872. The Royal Mail use another variant, Weston-Subedge, on postal addresses.

== Industry ==
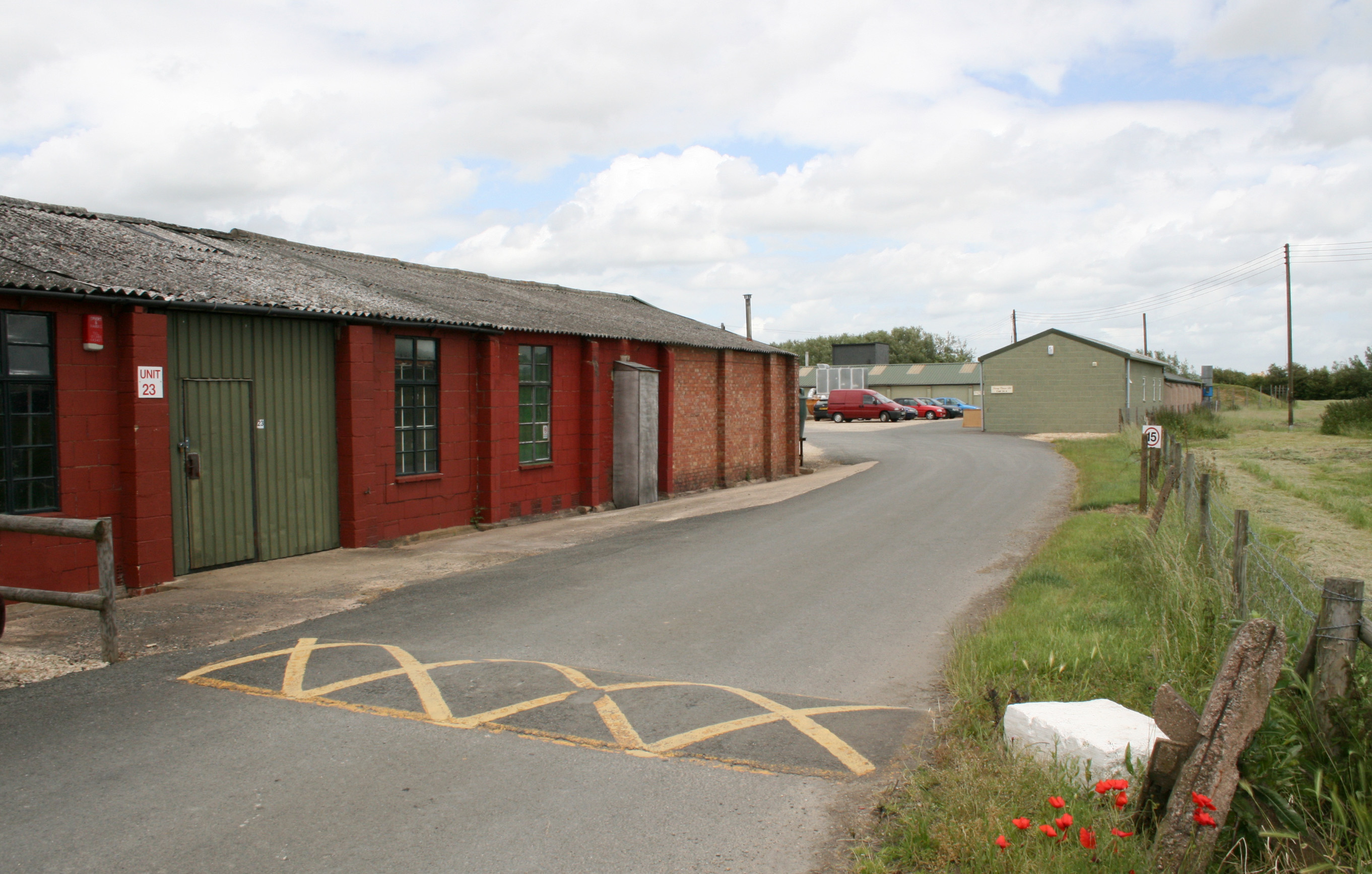
Weston Industrial Estate

As well as a few local businesses, Weston Industrial Estate just north of the village, provides a number of specialist businesses. The site of the estate was originally developed as a service area for RAF Honeybourne and a number of the original buildings from the 1940s are still recognizable today. The area contained the CO's office, NAAFI and Sergeants Mess well away from the main runways and taxi areas.

== Religious sites ==
The church of St Lawrence was built in the 13th century. It underwent Victorian restoration by Frederick Preedy in the 1850s. The lych gate was added in 1922 by Norman Jewson.

== Exclave ==
The civil parish of Weston-sub-Edge is one of the few left in England to have a detached portion. The northern part of the parish is separated by a narrow strip of Aston Subedge's land.

== Sport ==
Power Maxed Racing, a motorsport team competing in British Touring Car Championship and the TCR UK Touring Car Championship, are based in Weston-sub-Edge.
