= Admington =

Village in Warwickshire, England

Coordinates: 52.112760°N 1.708000°W

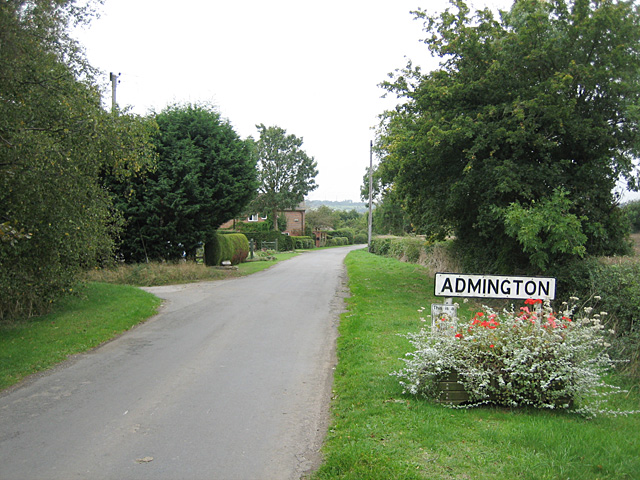
- The main street of Admington

- Location within Warwickshire
- Area: 1.56 sq mi (4.0 km^{2})
- Population: 100 (2001 census)
  - Density: 64/sq mi (25/km^{2})
- OS grid reference: SP200460
- Civil parish: Admington
- District: Stratford-on-Avon
- Shire county: Warwickshire
- Region: West Midlands
- Country: England
- Sovereign state: United Kingdom
- Post town: SHIPSTON-ON-STOUR
- Postcode district: CV36
- Police: Warwickshire
- Fire: Warwickshire
- Ambulance: West Midlands

Admington is a village and civil parish in the Stratford-on-Avon district of the English county of Warwickshire. The name Admington means "estate associated with a man called Æthelhelm" and the village is referred to in the Domesday Book as Edelmintone. Until 31 March 1931 the parish was a part of Gloucestershire. The village lies 1 3/4 miles (2.8 km) north-west of Ilmington and 5 1/2 miles (8.9 km) north-east of Chipping Campden. The parish has an area of 997 acres (403 ha). Admington shares a village hall with the neighbouring village of Quinton. In the 2001 census the parish had a population of 100. The 2011 census gives population details combined with those of Quinton. Admington is the location of Admington Hall, an early 17th-century country house with an 18th-century façade.
