= Dover's Hill =

Hill in Gloucestershire, England

Coordinates: 52°03′18″N 1°48′08″W

Geography
- Location: Cotswolds
- Country: England

Dover's Hill is a 754 feet (230 metres) hill in the Cotswolds area of central England. The hill is 1 mile (1.6 km) north-west of Chipping Campden in Gloucestershire. Dover's Hill and the surrounding land is the property of The National Trust.

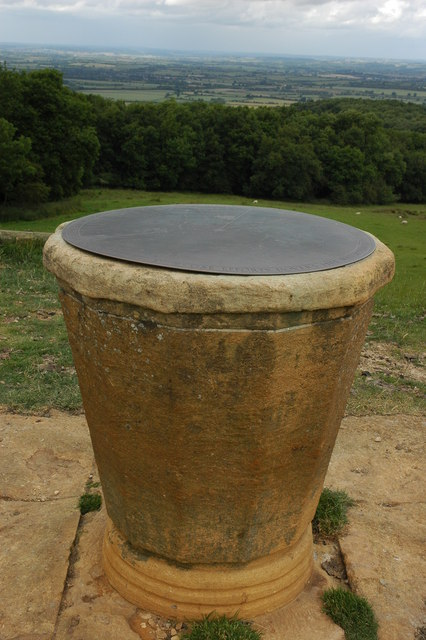
The toposcope on Dover's Hill

On the top of the hill is a trig point, and also a toposcope illustrating many of the landmarks that are visible from it. These include the Black Mountains in South Wales and the Long Mynd in Shropshire (nearly 60 miles (97 km) away).

A monument of 1934 commemorates Robert Dover, founder of the Cotswold Olimpick Games, precursor of the modern Olympic Games.
