= Aston-sub-Edge =

Village in Gloucestershire, England

Coordinates: 52.073°N 1.801°W

Aston Subedge
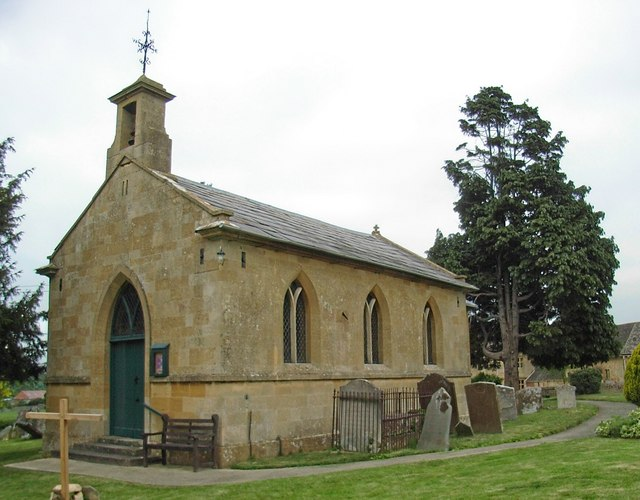
- St Andrew's church

- Location within Gloucestershire
- Interactive map showing the parish boundary
- Population: 52 (2021 census)
- OS grid reference: SP142411
- Civil parish: Aston Subedge
- District: Cotswold
- Shire county: Gloucestershire
- Region: South West
- Country: England
- Sovereign state: United Kingdom
- Post town: Chipping Campden
- Postcode district: GL55 6
- Dialling code: 01386
- Police: Gloucestershire
- Fire: Gloucestershire
- Ambulance: South Western
- UK Parliament: North Cotswolds

Aston-sub-Edge (officially Aston Subedge) is a village and civil parish in the Cotswold district of Gloucestershire, England, close by the border with Worcestershire (to the west). At the 2021 census, the parish had a population of 52 people in 26 households. The village is about 8 miles (13 km) east of Evesham, and near the village of Weston-sub-Edge.

The church of St Andrew was built in 1797 by Thomas Johnson of Warwick.

Christopher Savage, Lord of Elmley Castle, Worcestershire, and an Esquire of the Body of King Henry VIII, had livery of the manor of Aston-sub-Edge on 14 May 1521, which he had inherited from his father, Sir Christopher Savage, Knt., (who fell at the Battle of Flodden in 1513) who had acquired it by his marriage to Anne, daughter of Sir John Stanley, Knt., of Elford, Staffordshire (d. Nov 1508)

Dover's Hill lies about 1 mile (2 km) to the south of Aston Subedge. In the 1630s Endymion Porter, a courtier and diplomat who lived at Aston-sub-Edge, brought members of the court to see the Cotswold Olympics which were held on Dover's Hill.

== Demographics ==
Census population of Aston Subedge parish
Census	Population	Female	Male	Households	Source
2011	107	55	52	43	
2021	52	27	25	26	
