= Quinton, Warwickshire =

Coordinates: 52°7.313751′N 1°44.490280′W

Quinton
- Civil parish
- Country: England
- Sovereign state: United Kingdom

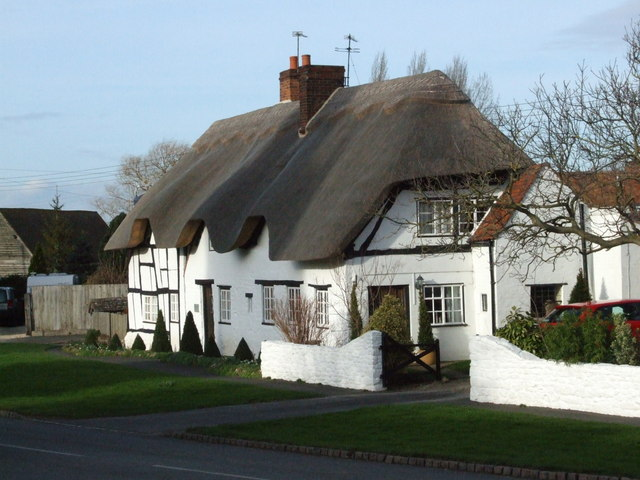
Cottages opposite to the church in Lower Quinton

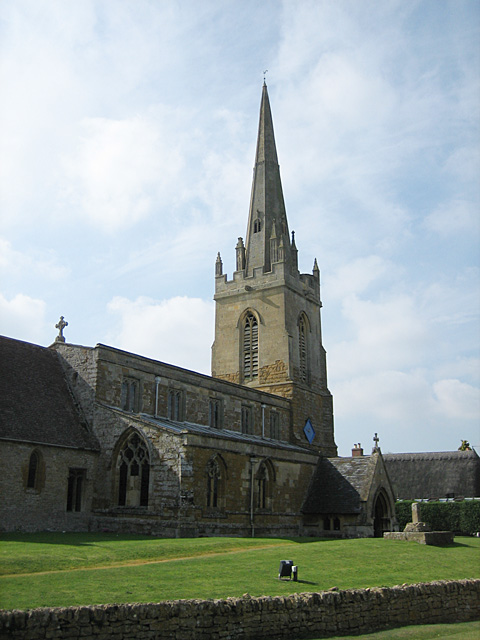

Quinton is a civil parish in the Stratford-on-Avon district of Warwickshire, England, about six miles south of Stratford-upon-Avon. According to the 2001 Census it had a population of 1,503, increasing to 1,968 at the 2011 Census. The parish contains Upper Quinton and Lower Quinton. It lies on the Heart of England Way.

== History ==
The Domesday Book recorded that these were two of about seven manors given to Hugh de Grandmesnil following the Norman Conquest (he had larger rewards in other counties). Upper and Lower Quinton were listed under Gloucestershire:

The same Hugh holds Upper Quinton. There are two hides. One thegn held it. In demesne two ploughs and five villans and one bordars with three ploughs. There are four slaves and one female slave. It was worth £7, now £4.

The same Hugh holds Lower Quinton and Roger holds of him. There are twelve hides. Baldwin held it TRE. In demesne three ploughs and seventeen villans and two bordars with nine ploughs. There are six slaves. It was worth £7, now £6.

Lower Quinton was the site of the notorious murder in 1945 of Charles Walton, in what was believed by some to have been a witchcraft-related ritual killing.
