= Baldock Town Hall =

Municipal building in Baldock, Hertfordshire, England

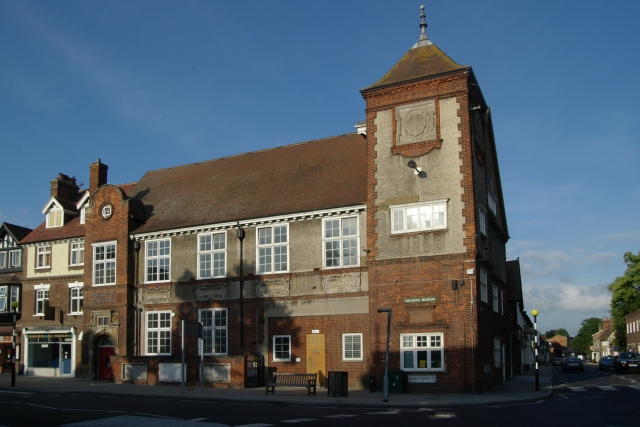
- Baldock Town Hall

- Shown in Hertfordshire
- 51.9894°N 0.1888°W
- Location: High Street, Baldock

History
- Built: 1897

Site notes
- Architectural style: Edwardian Baroque style

Baldock Town Hall is a municipal building in the High Street, Baldock, Hertfordshire, England. The structure, which now operates as an arts and heritage centre, is a locally listed building.

== History ==
Following significant population growth, largely associated with the status of Baldock as a market town, the area became an urban district in 1894. The lord of the manor, Thomas Pryor, offered to donate a site to the council for the purpose of erecting a town hall: the site he offered had previously been occupied by a shop which had burnt down. The cost of construction, which had been estimated at £2,000 became a contentious issue during the local election in the town in April 1896: candidates supporting the project were ultimately returned with large majorities.

The new building was designed in the Edwardian Baroque style, built in red brick with stone facings and with a stucco finish on the first floor and was officially opened by Pryor on 25 November 1897. The design involved an asymmetrical main frontage with six bays facing onto the High Street with the end bays projected forward; the left hand end bay featured a round headed doorway and a fanlight flanked by pilasters supporting a moulded surround with a keystone; there was a cross-window on the first floor and a gable above containing an oculus. The second and third bays contained cross-windows on both floors while the fourth and fifth bays contained openings for the fire engines on the ground floor and cross windows on the first floor. There was a modillioned cornice surmounting these four bays. The right hand end bay featured a three-stage tower with a three-light window in the first stage, a four-light window in the second stage and a panel inscribed with the shield of the Knights Templar in the third stage; on the north-western elevation, there was a panel inscribed with the coat of arms of the Knights Hospitaller. The tower was surmounted by a pyramid-shaped roof. The panels on the third stage of the tower recalled the tradition that the Church of St Mary the Virgin and much of the surrounding parish had been built by the Knights Templar in the 12th century and expanded by the Knights Hospitaller in the 14th century. Internally, the principal rooms were a main hall, a public library and a reading room.

After the town hall became inadequate for the council's requirements, the council relocated to a large 18th century house known as The Grange, further to the south-east along the High Street, in September 1936. The fire service continued to operate from the town hall but moved to new premises in Weston Way after the Second World War.

The building continued to be made available for community use and, in 1999, part of the ground floor was converted for use by the newly-formed Baldock Museum but, in 2005, the rest of the building was mothballed and was withdrawn from use by the public. In response, a group of individuals formed an entity known as the Baldock Town Hall Group, which later became a registered charity, with the objective of preserving and maintaining the building. An arts festival, at which the speakers included the actress, Dawn French, took place in the building in October and November 2008. In October 2013, the Baldock Town Hall Group acquired a long lease on the property and subsequently carried out the refurbishment works necessary to establish an arts and heritage centre in the building.
