= Baldock Cemetery =

Cemetery in Hertfordshire, England

Coordinates: 51.990101°N 0.196069°W

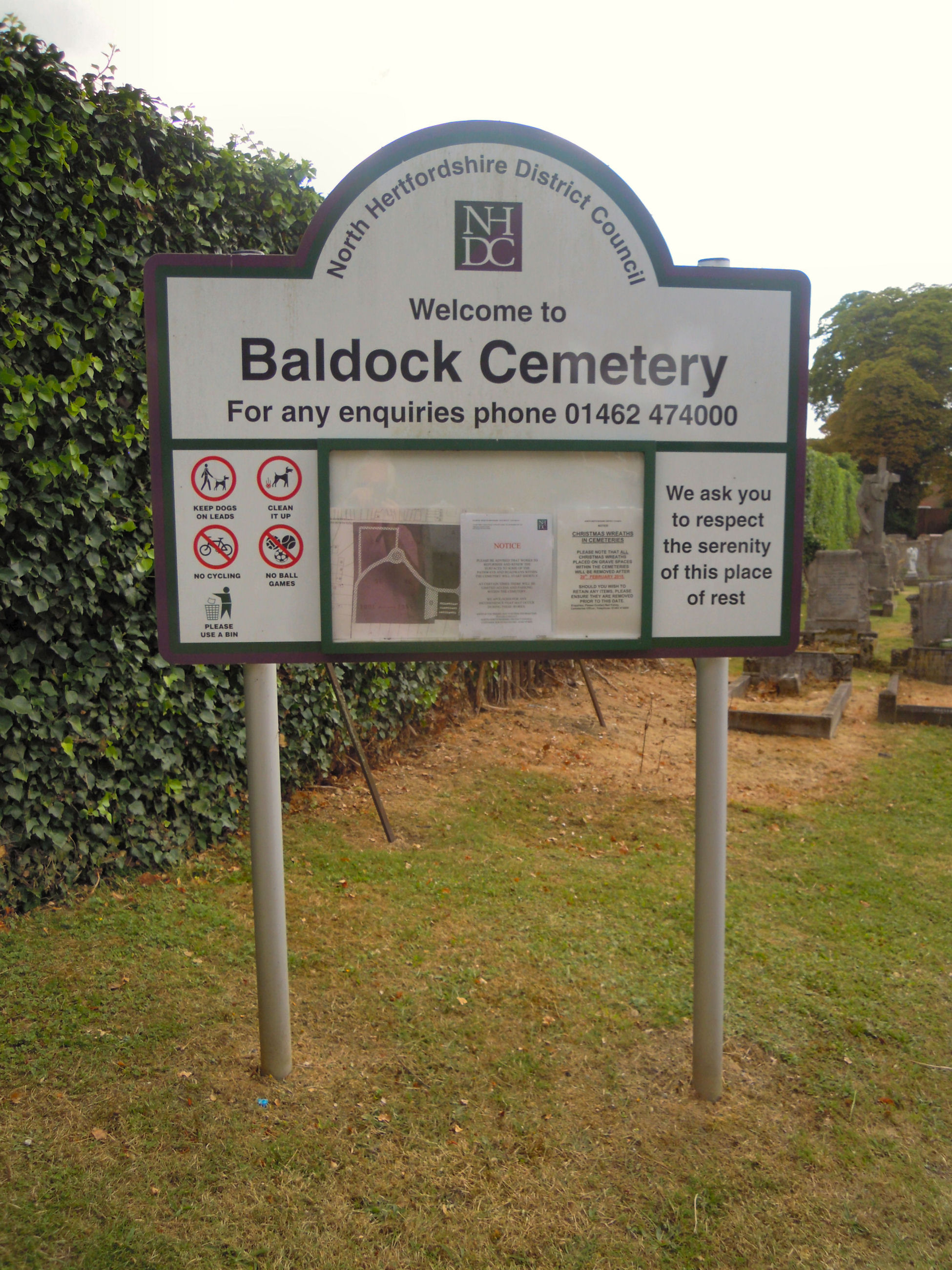
Sign at Baldock Cemetery

Baldock Cemetery is the burial ground for the market town of Baldock in North Hertfordshire and the surrounding area. It is maintained by North Hertfordshire District Council.

Baldock Cemetery opened in the early twentieth century when the churchyard of the nearby Church of St Mary the Virgin was closed for burials. Access to the cemetery is via a drive from The Sycamores, which is off Norton Road in Baldock. The cemetery is open for the burial of people of all faiths.

Seven casualties from both World Wars are buried here, two from World War I and five from World War II including Flight Sergeant Cyril Ivan Walker of 49 Squadron, who was killed when the Lancaster bomber he was in crashed on take-off in April 1945; these graves are distinguished by Commonwealth War Graves Commission headstones.

It has been stated that the cemetery will be full by about 2020. An attempt by The Baldock Society in 2012 to gauge whether there was local support for a new cemetery in Baldock was met with little interest.

== Gallery ==
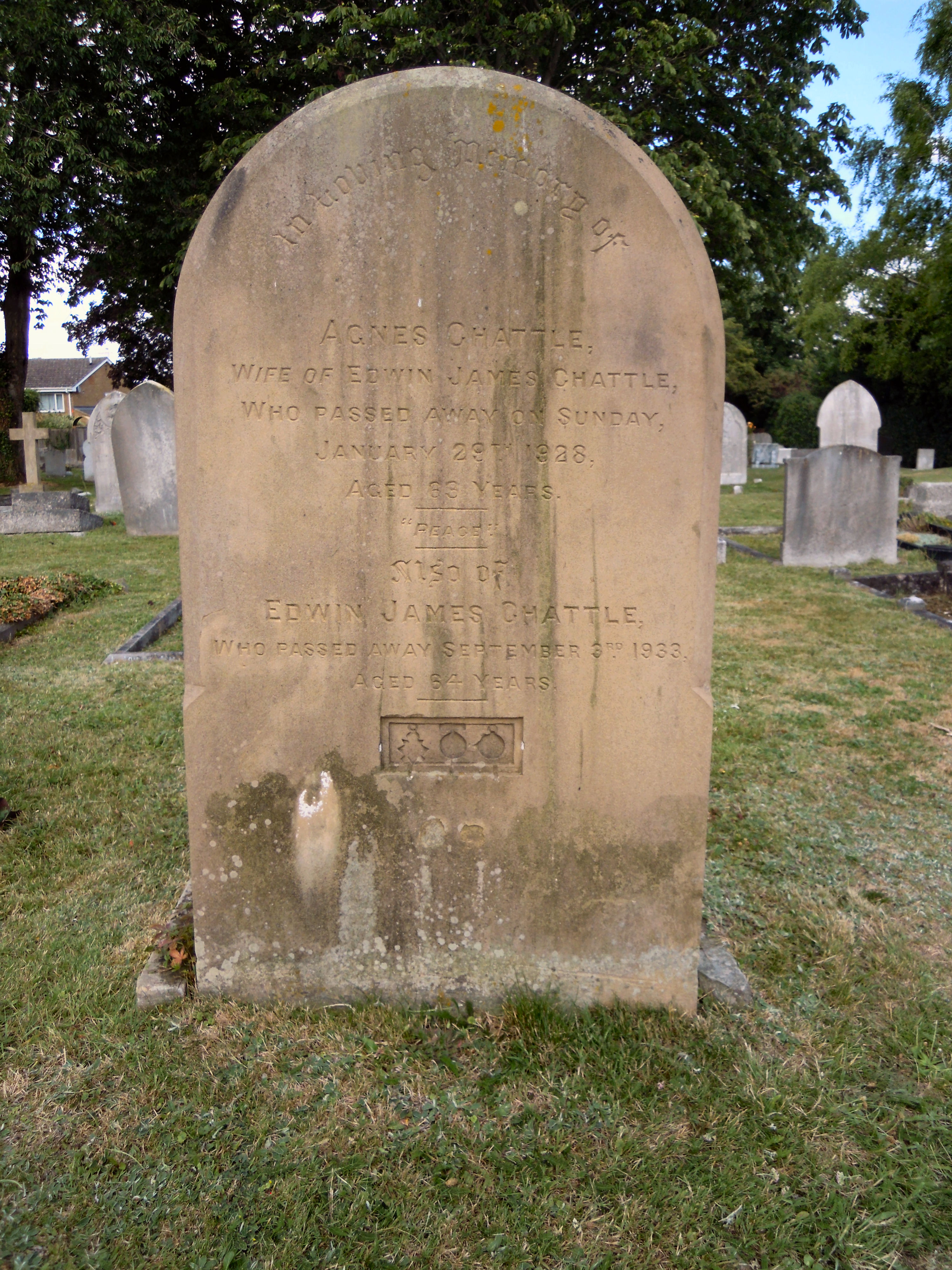
An unusual headstone showing a formerly glazed recess to contain World War I medals

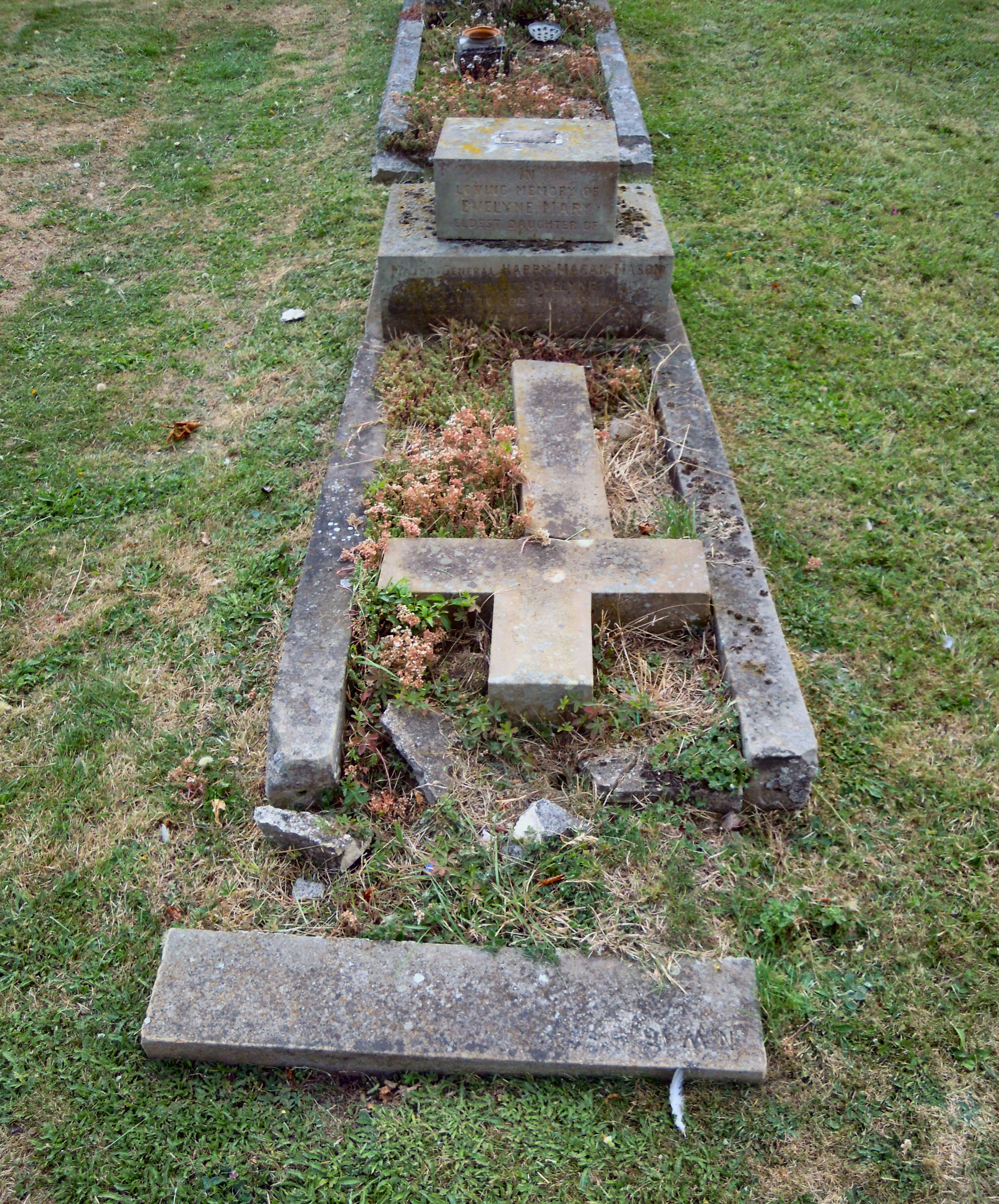
The grave of Evelyne Mary, the daughter of Major General Harry Macan Mason

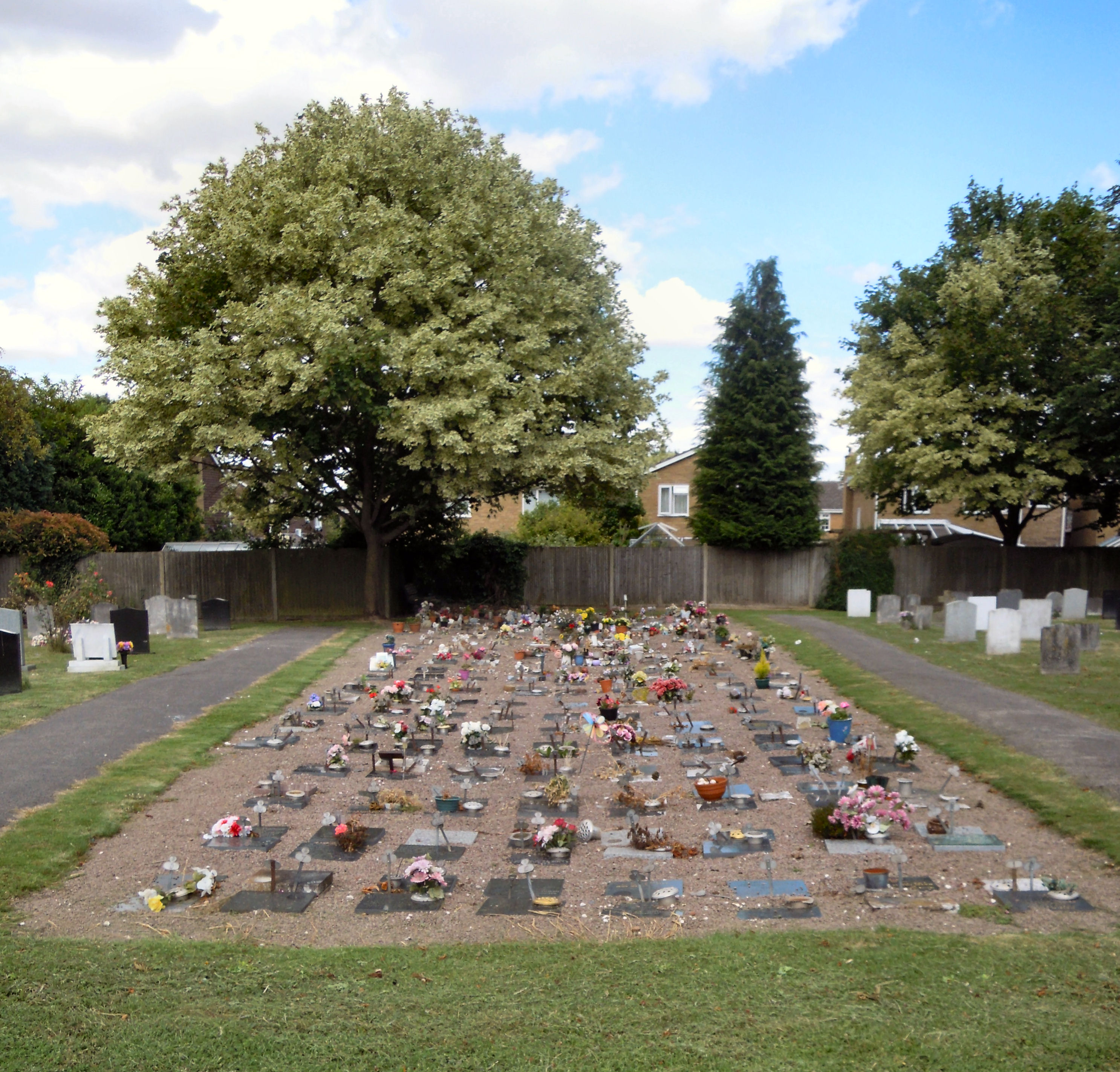
The section for cremated remains
