= Arthur Archdale =

English cricketer and Royal Artillery officer

Personal information
- Full name: Arthur Archdale
- Born: 8 September 1882; Baldock, Hertfordshire, England
- Died: 30 March 1948 (aged 65); Surrey, England

Domestic team information
- Years: Team
- 1920–1921: Army
- FC debut: 25 June 1920 Army v Royal Navy
- Last FC: 8 June 1921 Army v Oxford University

Career statistics
Competition	First-class
Matches	5
Runs scored	91
Batting average	18.20
100s/50s	0/0
Top score	38*
Balls bowled	869
Wickets	19
Bowling average	23.52
5 wickets in innings	0
10 wickets in match	0
Best bowling	4/102
Catches/stumpings	5/–
- Source: CricketArchive, 18 October 2008

Arthur Somerville Archdale, DSO (8 September 1882 – 30 March 1948) was an English cricketer and Royal Artillery officer. He was born in Baldock and died in Camberley. His father was F. Archdale of Baldock; he married Mildred Barbara Funnell in 1907.

== Military career ==
Archdale was educated at Repton School, the Royal Military Academy, Woolwich. He was commissioned into the Royal Regiment of Artillery in December 1901.

At the start of World War I, he had attained the rank of captain and in May 1915, he was appointed as adjutant, 4th North Midland Brigade, Royal Field Artillery. In February 1917 he was appointed as brigade major. In June 1918, he joined the General Staff as a general staff officer, 2nd grade (GSO2) until early 1919.

In April 1922, Archdale was Staff Officer RA, Western Command for just over a year. In August 1924, he once again became a GSO2, until 21 May 1927. For four years until January 1935 he was commander, 9th Field Brigade Royal Artillery, based at Bulford. From October 1935 until November 1939, two months after the outbreak of World War II, he was Commander, Royal Artillery, 42nd (East Lancashire) Infantry Division.

By this time, Archdale was 57 years old and he was transferred to the Regular Army Reserve of Officers (Royal Artillery) in May 1942 and thence, at 60, he was retired, as an honorary brigadier.

== Cricketing appearances ==
Archdale made three appearances for the Army in first-class cricket, as well as two appearances for the Combined Services. He played one miscellaneous fixture for the Free Foresters against the Royal Engineers in 1929.

== Honours and awards ==
Companion of the Distinguished Service Order 4 June 1917
Croix de Guerre (France) 17 December 1917
Mentioned in dispatches four times during World War I
