= Josiah William Smith =

English barrister, legal writer and judge

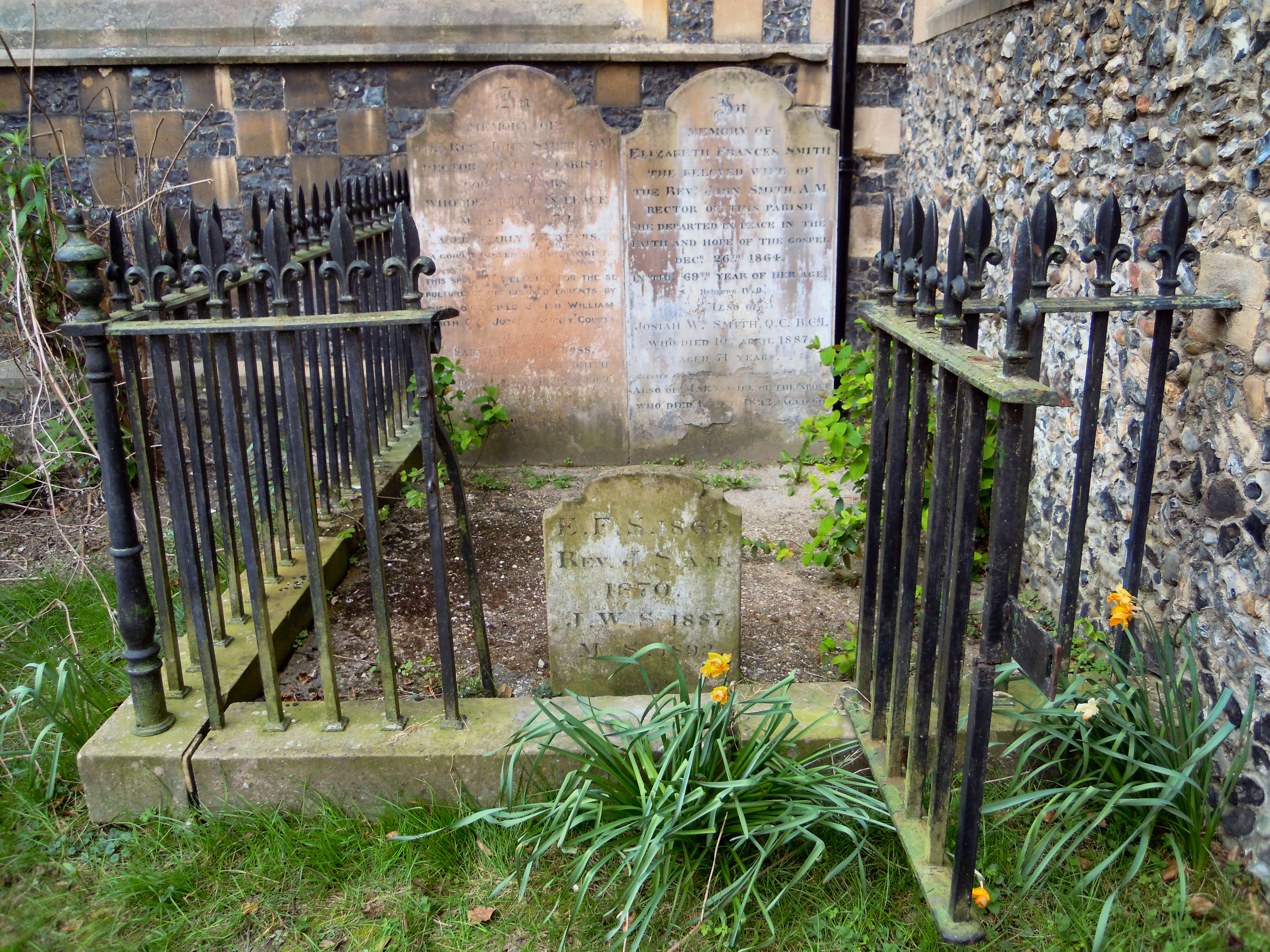
The grave of Rev. John Smith (left) and Josiah William Smith (right) in the churchyard of St Mary's church in Baldock

Josiah William Smith, QC (3 April 1816 – 10 April 1887) was an English barrister, legal writer and judge.

== Life ==
The only child of the Rev. John Smith, Rector of St Mary's church in Baldock, Hertfordshire, he was born on 3 April 1816, and graduated LL.B. from Trinity Hall, Cambridge, 1841. He entered Lincoln's Inn on 9 November 1836, where he was called to the bar on 6 May 1841, and mainly practised in the Court of Chancery.

Becoming Queen's Counsel on 25 February 1861, Smith was chosen a bencher of Lincoln's Inn on 13 March following, and in September 1865 became County Court judge for Herefordshire and Shropshire (circuit No. 27). He resented being overruled by a superior court, and on one occasion declared his reason for not giving leave to appeal to be that if he was overruled the court would be deciding contrary to law and justice. This remark earned him a rebuke from the Court of Queen's Bench.

Smith, who was a Justice of the Peace for Herefordshire, retired from the bench on a pension in February 1879. He died at Clifton on 10 April 1887, and was buried at Baldock.

== Works ==
Smith was best known as the author of the Manual of Equity (1845), Compendium of the Law of Real and Personal Property (1855), and Manual of Common Law and Bankruptcy (1864). These standard works went through many editions. He was the draughtsman of the Consolidated General Orders of the High Court of Chancery (1860), and also edited Charles Fearne's Contingent Remainders and John Mitford's Chancery Pleadings. In addition he compiled manuals of devotion and a Summary of the Law of Christ (1859 and 1860).

== Family ==
Smith married in 1844 Mary, second daughter of George Henry Hicks, M.D., of Baldock. They are buried in the family plot in the churchyard of St Mary's church in Baldock.

== Notes ==
Attribution

This article incorporates text from a publication now in the public domain: Lee, Sidney, ed. (1898). "Smith, Josiah William". Dictionary of National Biography. Vol. 53. London: Smith, Elder & Co.
