= Baldock =

Town in Hertfordshire, England

Coordinates: 51.99°N 0.19°W

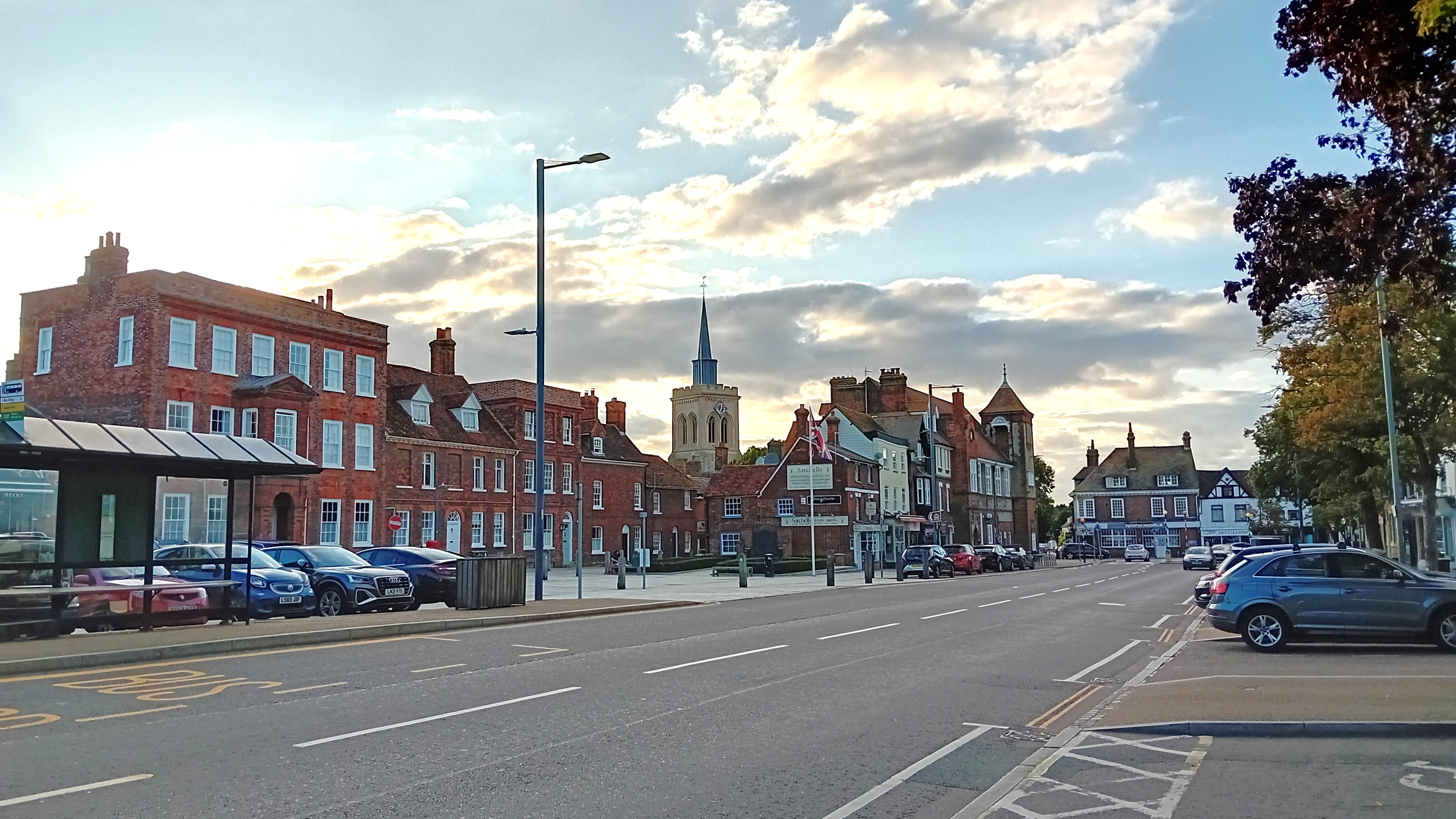
- Baldock High Street

- Location within Hertfordshire
- Population: 10,615 (Built up area, 2021)
- OS grid reference: TL247337
- District: North Hertfordshire
- Shire county: Hertfordshire
- Region: East
- Country: England
- Sovereign state: United Kingdom
- Post town: BALDOCK
- Postcode district: SG7
- Dialling code: 01462
- Police: Hertfordshire
- Fire: Hertfordshire
- Ambulance: East of England
- UK Parliament: North East Hertfordshire

Baldock (/ˈbɔːldək/ BAWL-dək) is a historic market town in the North Hertfordshire district of Hertfordshire, England. The River Ivel rises from springs in the town. It lies 33 miles (53 km) north of London and 14 miles (23 km) north northwest of the county town of Hertford. Nearby towns include Royston to the northeast, Letchworth and Hitchin to the southwest and Stevenage to the south. In 2021 it had a population of 10,615.

== History ==
=== Name ===
Baldock was founded by the Knights Templar (after whom the town's secondary school is named) as a medieval market town in the 1140s. It was laid out by the Knights Templar on land in the manor of Weston in the hundred of Broadwater, granted by Gilbert de Clare, 1st Earl of Pembroke before his death in 1148. The 1850 tithe map, drawn up before the parish boundaries were extended in the later 19th century, clearly shows the boundaries of the land grant made from the manor of Weston in the 12th century; it is a triangular parcel of land beside the old Roman Road, cut out from an older estate.

The popular story for the origin of the name Baldock is that it is a derivation from the Old French name for Baghdad: Baldac or later Baudac. While Damascus was the farthest location of Templar military activity during the Crusades, they would have been aware of the significance of Baghdad, which was widely regarded as the most prosperous market in the world. Perhaps the Templars hoped that the name would confer a similar prosperity on their own market town in England. Founding contemporaneous documents use the spelling Baudac, but it is first recorded as "Baldac" in the Pipe Rolls of Hertfordshire in 1168.

Walter William Skeat writes in The Place-names of Hertfordshire (1904):

All that remains is to discover the reason for this curious name; nor is it difficult. In Clutterbuck's Hist. of Herts., ii, 267, we find that Baldock was built by the Knights Templars before the reign of Henry III; he cites from Monast. Anglic., ii. 524—"patribus milit. Templi Salomonis … manerio, in qua terra ipsi construxerunt quendam Burgum qui dicitur Baudac." Thus the mystery disappears when we perceive that the name was conferred by the Knights Templars, who were necessarily as familiar with the O.F. name Baldac as they were with that of Solomon. The statement in Salmon's Herts. seems to be quite correct, viz., that Baldock was "an arbitrary name given by the Knights Templars when they made their settlement and built here." He adds that the grant of the land was made to them by Gilbert, Earl of Pembroke, in the time of Stephen; and he refers the name to "Bagdet or Baldach, near Babylon, whence they were ejected by the Saracens."

Others, however, consider it more likely that the Knights Templar used a name already in use, particularly since the location was already a crossroads. In addition the settlement was already thriving as a late Anglo-Saxon part of Weston. Alternative etymologies have been suggested, including Middle English balled, meaning "bald", together with Old English āc, meaning "oak" (the site may have been identified by a large old tree near the Anglo-Saxon graveyard or where the Templar church was built); and a conjectured Old English personal name *Bealdoc, from beald, meaning "bold", with a diminutive -oc suffix. These derivations, however, are not entirely satisfactory.

=== Prehistoric to Roman times ===
Prehistoric remains on Clothall Common date back as far as c 3000 BCE. Many Roman remains have been discovered in building work in and around the town, and the core of the Roman settlement lies between Walls Field and Bakers Close. Earlier Iron Age remains have also been uncovered in the same general location, which may be the earliest town ever to develop in Britain.

Baldock has an exceptionally rich archaeological heritage. Palaeolithic, Neolithic and Bronze Age settlements show the site of Baldock has been almost continuously occupied since prehistoric times.

The earliest monument in the area is a narrow cursus, probably from the middle Neolithic. At the beginning of the Iron Age there was a hillfort at Arbury Banks, 5 km to the northeast of Baldock, that dominated the area. In the Late Iron Age (c. 100 BC), the local power base shifted from the hillfort to the vicinity of Baldock. The soil was easily farmed and transportation was more convenient. In the later part of the middle Iron Age (from prior to c.100 BC) Baldock became the site of a large oppidum, arguably the largest such site in Britain. The oppidum in turn became a sizeable Roman settlement, which although not administratively important, seems to have been a significant cultural centre. The Baldock area is also host to the highest quantity of finds of ancient coins in Hertfordshire after the Verulamium region. The site was used until the fifth or sixth century, with some rare sub-Roman pottery found in the vicinity. The Roman settlement gradually disappeared during the so-called "Dark Ages" and left unoccupied through the eleventh century, and resultantly there is no entry for Baldock in the Domesday Book.

=== 16th century ===
The modern layout of the town and many buildings in the centre date from the sixteenth century, with the earliest dating from the fourteenth century.

Thanks to its location, the town was a major staging post between London and the north: many old coaching inns still operate as pubs and hotels, and Baldock has a surprising number of pubs for its size. The High Street is very wide, a typical feature of medieval market places where more than one row of buildings used to stand. In the case of Baldock, the bottom of the High Street had three such rows, until Butcher's Row was demolished by the turnpike authorities in the 1770s.

Since the 16th century, Baldock has been a centre for malting, subsequently becoming a regional brewing centre with at least three large brewers still operating at the end of the 19th century, despite a decline in demand for the types of beer produced locally. The 1881 Census records approximately 30 drinking establishments (the town's population was at that time around 1900). Throughout the early 20th century a large number of pubs continued to operate, many of which were sustained by the adjacent and much larger town of Letchworth, which had no alcohol retailers prior to 1958, and had only two pubs and a single hotel bar until the mid-1990s. Its larger population had for many years visited both Baldock and Hitchin for refreshment.

The Wynn almshouses, in the High Street, were founded in 1621 and were endowed "To the World's End" by John Wynne, a cloth merchant from London who left £1000 in his will of 1614 for their upkeep.

Since 1850, the town has a railway station which today operates on the line between London Kings Cross and Cambridge. With frequent services to London, including fast services of around 30 minutes, the town is home to many commuters. The station is part of the Thameslink Programme which connects Cambridge to Farringdon, City Thameslink and Blackfriars via the Great Northern Route. There has been human activity on the site well before the modern town was founded.

A medieval leper colony, on Royston Road, was located during excavations in 2003, having been thought for many years to lie to the south-east of the town on the former Pesthouse Lane (now Clothall Road), the A507.

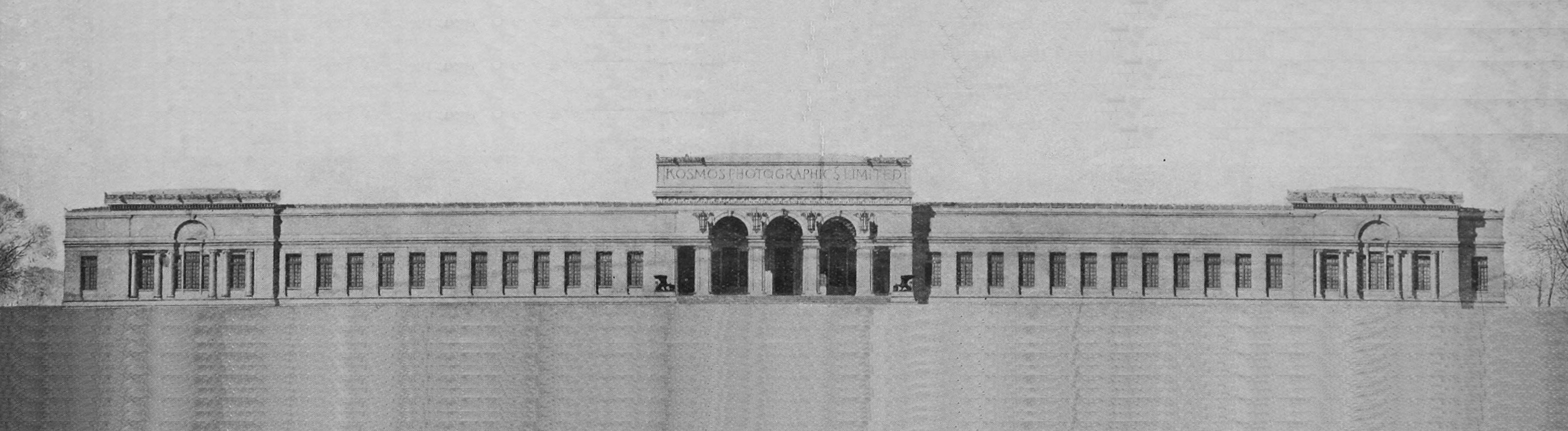
The 1924 Kosmos Photographics Limited factory on High Street, designed by Thomas H. F. Burditt. It is now a Tesco.

From 1808 to 1814, Baldock hosted a station in the shutter telegraph chain that connected the Admiralty in London to its naval ships in the port of Great Yarmouth.

A history of Baldock during the Middle Ages was compiled by Vivian Crellin, a former headmaster of The Knights Templar School. Local archaeologists Keith Fitzpatrick-Matthews and Gilbert Burleigh published Ancient Baldock: The Story of an Iron Age and Roman Town in 2007.

Baldock's position at the crossing of two important thoroughfares, the Great North Road and the Icknield Way has made it a stopping point for a number of illustrious visitors, including Charles I, who passed through Baldock en route for London after his arrest in 1648 and supposedly Dick Turpin. Preacher John Wesley came to the town in 1747.

In the 1960s and 70s Baldock was a centre of laser research at a MOD laboratory called SERL (Services Electronics Research Laboratory). This facility closed in the late 1970s and some projects and staff were transferred to RSRE (Royal Signals & Radar Establishment) near Pershore.

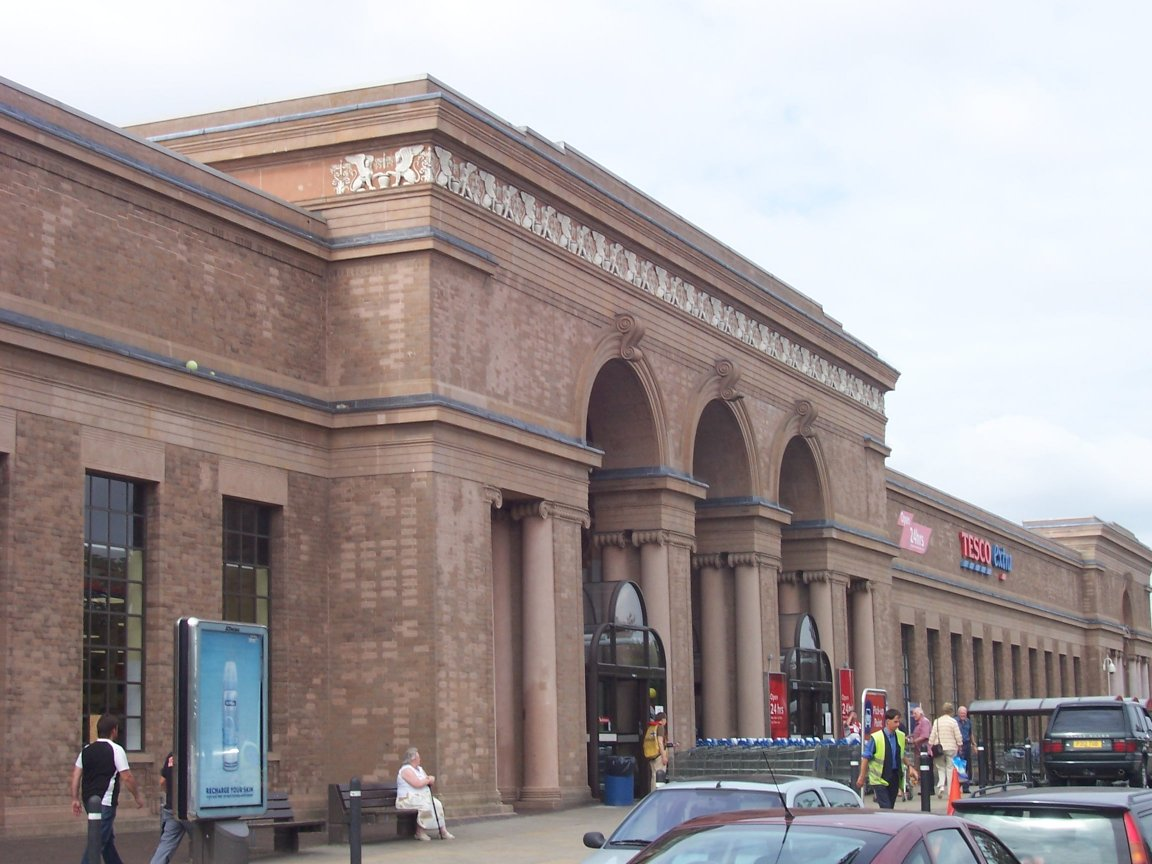
Tesco supermarket

Baldock was formerly the location of a film processing factory which closed before the company (originally based in Letchworth Garden City) could move in; local folklore has it that it was a silent film studio, but this is not the case. The building was then bought by the Full-Fashioned Hosiery Company from Halifax, later becoming the Kayser Bondor ladies stocking factory (which temporarily produced parachutes in World War II). The site was redeveloped to become a Tesco supermarket in the late 1980s, but the Art Deco facade of the former factory was retained and incorporated into the new building.

Malting and brewing were formerly major industries in the town, but apart from some light industry, today it is mostly a commuter town.

The original incarnation of the local football team Baldock Town F.C. was formed in 1905. The club disbanded in 2001, but a new club was formed two years later.

To the east of the town there is a large residential estate that was built in several phases. This is known as Clothall Common. An archaeological dig took place in this part of Baldock in the late 1980s.

According to the humorous book The Meaning of Liff, a Baldock is defined as: "The sharp prong on the top of a tree stump where the tree has snapped off before being completely sawn through".

== Landmarks ==
=== St Mary's Church ===
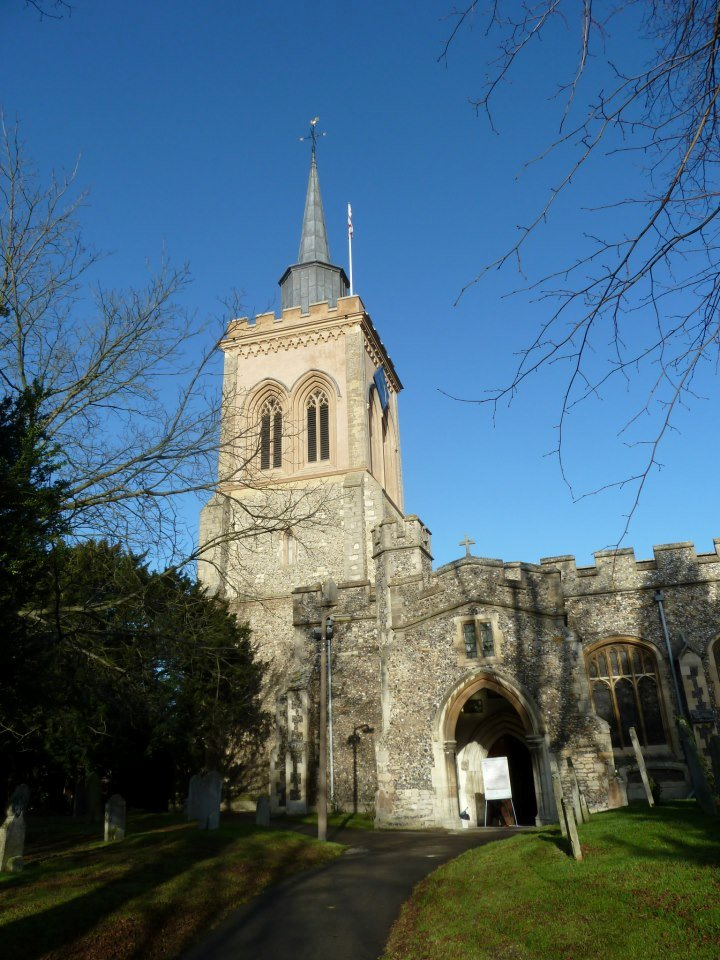
Church of St Mary the Virgin

Another notable building in the town is the thirteenth century Baldock Parish Church of St. Mary the Virgin at the centre of the town. The original church was built in about 1150 by the Knights Templar before being largely rebuilt in about 1330 by the Knights Hospitaller. It is a Grade I listed building.

== Transport ==
It was where the old Great North Road and the Icknield Way crossed. The A1(M) motorway (1963), was called the Baldock Bypass for some years. A £3,490,762 contract was given to A. Monk Ltd of Padgate in May 1965 for a 6.5-mile bypass, to take two years. It would make 39.5 mile of motorway on the A1, and 13 miles of motorway north of London. The bypass began at Corey's Mill, near Stevenage, to the north of Radwell. Baldock was a big bottleneck on the north-south route.

In March 2006, a new bypass removed the A505 road (part of the old Icknield Way to the east of Baldock) from the town.

== Events ==
Several events take place in Baldock throughout the year. The largest three are the Annual Beer Festival, the Charter fair and the Balstock music festival.

=== Baldock Festival ===
The Baldock Festival is a cultural festival which started in 1982 and starts on the May Day bank holiday weekend. The festival consists of three weeks of events throughout the town and local area, such as museum displays, wine tasting, whiskey tasting, beer festivals, brewery tours, cricket match, comedy sketches, family quiz night, mystery tour, open gardens, history talks, and several music events, some of which feature local bands. The festival Street Fair is held in the High Street, on the second weekend. Stallholders dress in themed clothing of the street fair theme, in 2022 this was 'Green' Baldock.

The Baldock Beer Festival takes place on the first weekend where local and national real ales, real ciders and continental lagers may be sampled.

=== Baldock Charter Fair ===
Baldock's Charter Fair dates back to 1199, when King John granted to the Templars the right of holding a yearly fair at Baldock on St. Matthew's Day and for four days following. This would mean the original fair was held on 21–25 September, but with the Calendar reform of 1752 the dates are now 2, 3 and 4 October. Today the principal part of the fair is a visiting Amusement Fair which sets up in the High Street.

=== Balstock ===
In 2015, the Balstock Festival completed its tenth year, having grown from a small event held in one pub, to a three-day event featuring more than 200 artists held on 13 stages across the town. It is now Hertfordshire's biggest free music festival with all proceeds going to a nominated charity. In 2015, that charity was Up on Downs, a local charity which aids families that have children with Down syndrome.

The 2012 festival resulted in a dispute between the organisers of the festival and the Performing Rights Society

== In literature ==
Daniel Defoe, in his book A tour through the whole island of Great Britain, passed through Baldock and commented: "Here is that famous Lane call'd Baldock Lane, famous for being so unpassable, that the Coaches and Travellers were oblig'd to break out of the Way even by Force, which the People of the Country not able to prevent, at length placed Gates, and laid their lands open, setting Men at the Gates to take a voluntary Toll, which Travellers always chose to pay, rather than plunge into Sloughs and Holes, which no Horse could wade through."

Baldock is one of the waypoints on Warren's long drive up the Great North Road, which brings about the occasion for the novel's plot, the rescue of the shipbuilding town of 'Sharples' (Blyth), in Ruined City by Nevil Shute.

Baldock is mentioned frequently in the supernatural thriller The Green Man by Kingsley Amis (1969). The town is the nearest centre to the fictional pub owned and run by the main character "Maurice Allington". The Green Man was later adapted into a television drama starring Albert Finney as Allington.

The author Monica Dickens, who lived in nearby Hinxworth for four years after World War II, refers to her regular visits to Baldock and to The George and Dragon public house in particular, in her 1978 autobiography An Open Book.

== Governance ==
Baldock has two tiers of local government, at district and county level: North Hertfordshire District Council and Hertfordshire County Council. At district level, Baldock is split into two wards: Baldock East, covering the part of the town to the east of the A507 including the Clothall Common estate, and Baldock West, covering the part of the town to the west of the A507 including the town centre. Baldock East is represented by Cllr Rhona Cameron and Cllr Stewart Willoughby, while Baldock West is represented by Cllr Alistair Willoughby, Cllr Emma Rowe, and Cllr Michael Muir. At county level, Baldock forms part of the Baldock and Letchworth East division and is represented by Cllr Alistair Willoughby. There is no parish or town council in Baldock, which has been an unparished area since 1974. North Hertfordshire District Council has a Baldock & Villages Community Forum where the councillors representing Baldock and two neighbouring rural wards meet to discuss local matters with residents.

Following the UK Government’s decision on Local Government Reorganisation in Hertfordshire, the county will be divided into four new unitary authorities, with Baldock set to be part of the new Central Unitary Authority. This reorganisation will see North Hertfordshire District Council and Hertfordshire County Council dissolved, with their functions transferred to the new authority. Elections to the new unitary authorities are scheduled for May 2027, with elected members serving on a shadow authority until 1 April 2028, when the new councils formally assume responsibility. This will make the current district and county councillors the last to serve under the two‑tier system.

=== Parish ===
The parish of Baldock was created in the mid-twelfth century from the northern tip of the older parish of Weston, around the time of the town's founding by the Knights Templar. The parish was relatively small, being bounded by Icknield Way to the north, Clothall Road (Pesthouse Lane) to the east, South Road / Crabtree Lane to the south, and Weston Way / Norton Road to the west. From its founding until the nineteenth century the town was governed by the parish vestry and county authorities, in the same way as most rural areas; there was no separate borough corporation or other urban authority for the town.

The parish of Baldock was included in the Hitchin Poor Law Union from 1835.

=== Baldock local board (1872–1894) ===
Baldock
- Local Government District (1872–1894); Urban District (1894–1974)
- Coat of arms
- Population
  - 1891: 2,301
  - 1971: 5,770
- History
  - Created: 30 December 1872
  - Abolished: 31 March 1974
  - Succeeded by: North Hertfordshire
  - HQ: Baldock
- Contained within
  - County Council: Hertfordshire

In August 1872 sanitary districts were established, with public health and local government responsibilities being given to the boards of guardians of the poor law unions for all areas which did not have urban authorities. Baldock therefore became part of the Hitchin Rural Sanitary District, governed by the Hitchin Board of Guardians. Less than three months later, on 1 November 1872, a public meeting was held in Baldock where the town's ratepayers voted to establish a local board to govern the town, allowing it to become its own urban sanitary district, independent of the Hitchin Rural Sanitary District. The new board came into effect on 30 December 1872, when the Local Government Board gave its consent. The first chairman of the Baldock Local Board was Thomas Rigby Kewley, who was the rector of Baldock's parish church of St Mary's. Kewley served as chairman of the board until his death in 1885.

Baldock Local Board initially only covered the parish of Baldock. The district was enlarged in 1880 to take in adjoining areas where the urban area had expanded beyond the parish boundary, with parts of the five neighbouring parishes of Bygrave, Clothall, Weston, Willian, and Norton being brought under the local board's control from 29 September 1880. The Local Board generally met at the Rose and Crown public house at 8 Whitehorse Street in Baldock.

=== Baldock urban district (1894–1974) ===
Under the Local Government Act 1894, urban sanitary districts became urban districts on 31 December 1894. Baldock Local Board therefore became Baldock Urban District Council. The new council held its first meeting on 7 January 1895, when Evelyn Simpson was elected chairman. He had been the chairman of the previous Local Board. The Local Government Act 1894 also stipulated (at Section 61) that council meetings should not be held in licensed premises. The new council was therefore unable to meet at the Rose and Crown as the local board had done. The first meeting of the new council was held at the town's Reading Rooms on Whitehorse Street, with subsequent meetings from February 1895 onwards being held at the Infant School on Park Street.

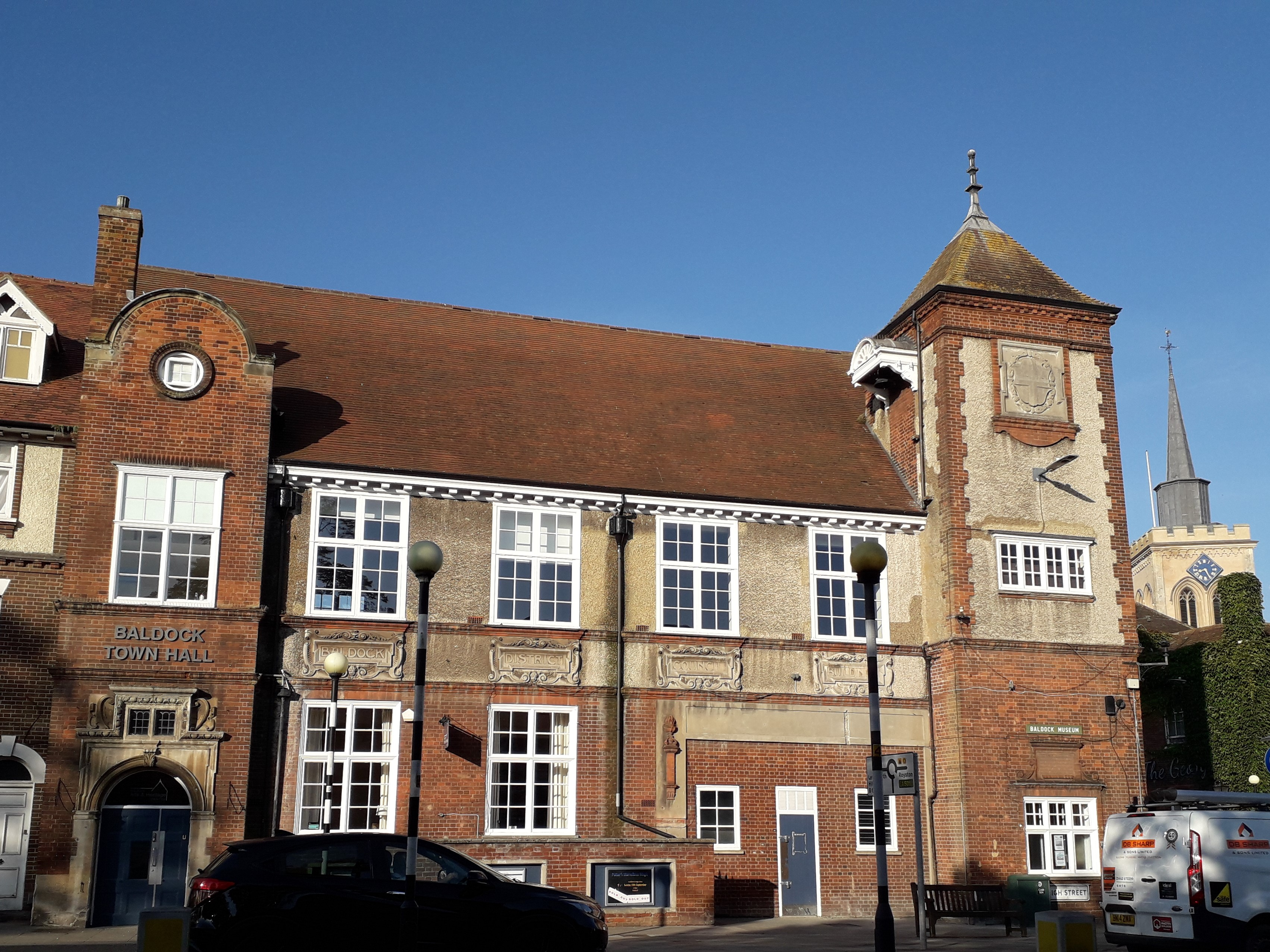
Baldock Town Hall, built 1897.

Shortly after its creation, the new council was presented with the possibility of building a new town hall to provide a public hall and other facilities for the town and a meeting place and office for the council. A fire had destroyed a row of shops in a prominent position at the junction of High Street and Whitehorse Street in the centre of the town, and the landlord, Thomas Pryor, offered to donate the site to the council if they would then build a town hall on it. Through 1895 and early 1896 the council was split on whether it should accept the offer and commit to the estimated £2,000 construction cost. This was the main issue at the council election in April 1896, with candidates presenting themselves as either supporters or opponents of the town hall scheme. The supporters won, and the scheme went ahead. Baldock Town Hall was formally opened on 25 November 1897, and included a public hall, council chamber and office, fire station, and library.

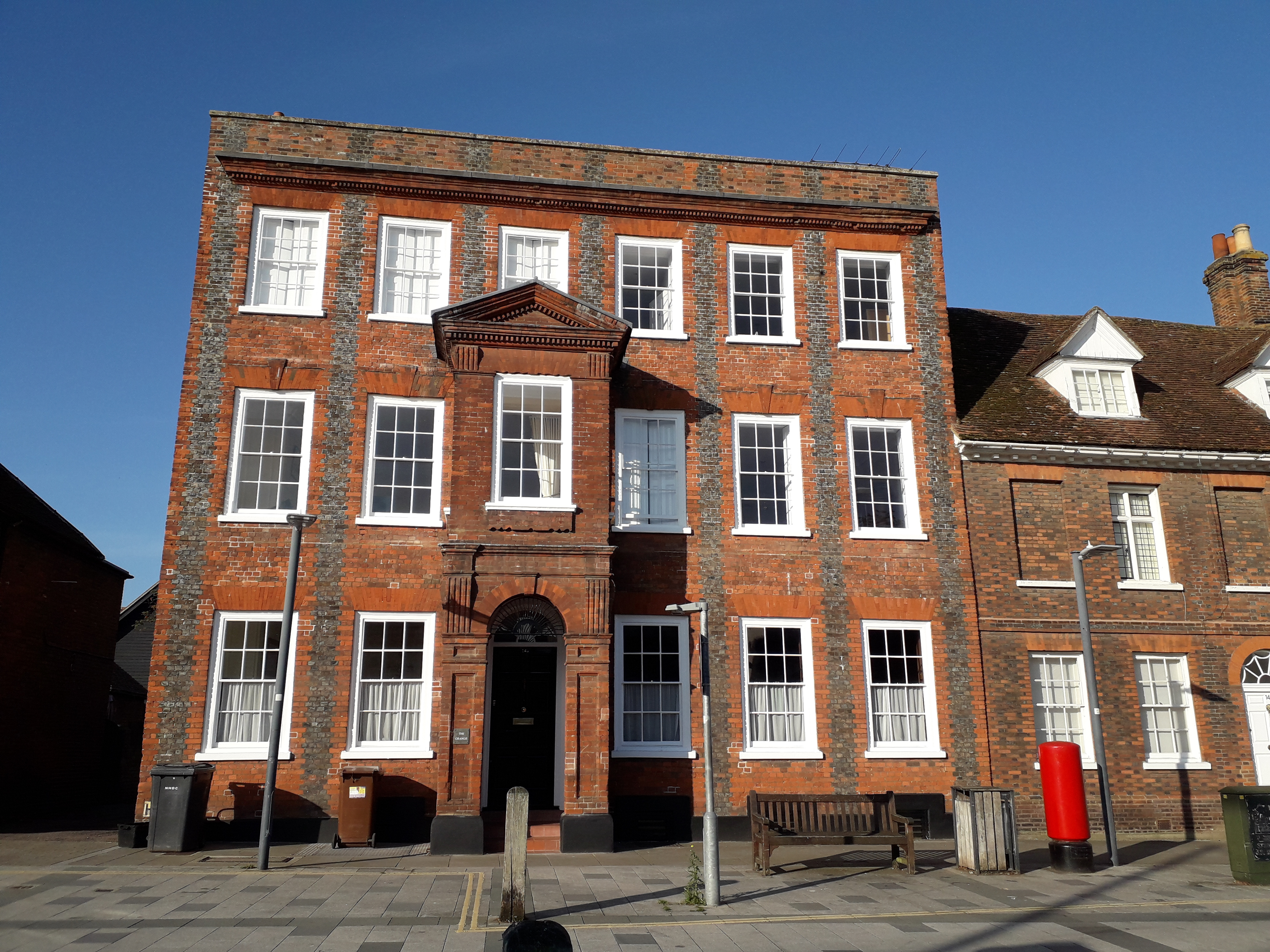
The Grange, offices of Baldock Urban District Council 1936–1974.

By 1935 the council had outgrown the offices in the Town Hall. The council bought a large eighteenth century house called The Grange at 14a High Street for £875, converting it to become the council's offices and meeting place. The Grange was formally opened as the council's new home in September 1936.

Baldock Urban District was abolished under the Local Government Act 1972, becoming part of the district of North Hertfordshire on 1 April 1974. No successor parish was created for the town, and so it became an unparished area.

==== Heraldry ====
Baldock Urban District Council was granted a coat of arms on 10 May 1951 by the College of Arms with the following blazoning:

Coat of arms of Baldock Urban District Council

Granted
10 May 1951
Crest
On a wreath of the colours, A representation of the head of a Roman's centurion's standard of SPQR with a thunderbolt, laurel wreath and eagle displayed gold.
Escutcheon
Or, on a cross between in the first and fourth quarters three chevronels gules, a garb of the first; on a chief sable, a stag's head erased gold between two Madonna lilies proper.
Motto
SIC VOS NON VOBIS

== Education ==
=== Primary education ===
- St Mary's Church of England (VC) Infant School
- St Mary's Church of England (VC) Junior School
- Hartsfield Junior Mixed and Infant School
- St John Roman Catholic Primary School

=== Secondary education ===
- The Knights Templar School
- Brandles School

== Notable people ==
- George Fox founder of Quakers (Society of Friends) visited The George and Dragon in Baldock.
- Arthur Archdale (1882–1948), cricketer and Royal Artillery officer
- Robert Bennet (died 1617), Anglican bishop and the Dean of Windsor.
- Sir Peter Bonfield (born 1944), business executive
- Samuel Farr (1827–1918), builder and architect.
- Lizzie Hall (born 1985), athlete; studied here
- Reginald Hine (1883–1949), solicitor and historian
- Albert Ireton (1879–1947), tug of war competitor and boxer
- Keith Milow (born 1945), artist; grew up here
- Ben Mosley (born 1981), expressionist artist
- David Rhodes (born 1988), singer and songwriter performing as RHODES
- Rev. John Smith (1799–1870), Rector at Baldock and the first person to decipher the Diary of Samuel Pepys
- Josiah William Smith (1816–1887), son of the above, an English barrister, legal writer and judge
- Elizabeth Walker (1583-1673), Mayflower passenger and wife of Richard Warren
- Leanne Wilson (born 1980), actress
- Ludwig Winder (1889–1946), Austrian-Czech writer, journalist and literary critic; died here
- Marianne Winder (1918–2001), Curator of Eastern Printed Manuscripts and Books at the Wellcome Institute for the History of Medicine; lived here in World War II

== Media ==
Local news and television programmes are provided by BBC East and ITV Anglia. Television signals are received from the Sandy Heath TV transmitter. The town's local radio stations are BBC Three Counties Radio and Heart Hertfordshire (originally BOB FM). The local newspapers are The Comet and Hertfordshire Mercury.

Baldock Radio Station, sometimes called Slip End Radio Station, opened in 1929 as part of the Imperial Wireless Chain. That year it made the first successful radiotelephone call to the USA, to the RCA radio station at Rocky Point, New York. A radio frequency control station was added at Baldock in 1938. In World War II, Baldock was one of the Allied radio stations that intercepted Kriegsmarine signals and forwarded them to Bletchley Park to be deciphered. After the war, the radio station joined the International Telecommunication Union. Ofcom has operated the station since 2003.

== Sport and leisure ==
In the town centre there is a small museum next to the Arts and Heritage Centre at Baldock Town Hall.

Baldock has a Cricket Club with three teams, a Netball Club and a Bowls club all based in Avenue Park.

There is a Non-League football club called Baldock Town F.C. who play at Arlesey Town's Hitchin Road ground. There is a Sunday league football team Templars FC

=== Recreation routes ===
The Icknield Way passes through the town. It is a multi-user route for walkers, horse riders and off-road cyclists, which is a 110-mile (180 km) journey from Ivinghoe Beacon in Buckinghamshire to Knettishall Heath in Suffolk. The Letchworth Greenway passes through Baldock, but the majority is predominantly in Letchworth. The path of the Greenway is 13.6 miles (21.9 km).

== Nearby villages ==
- Ashwell
- Bygrave
- Caldecote
- Clothall
- Hinxworth
- Newnham
- Radwell
- Wallington
- Weston

== See also ==
- Jack o' Legs - legendary 14th century "giant" associated with the town
- Baldock Cemetery
- Ivel Springs nature reserve
