= John Smith (priest, born 1799) =

Rector of St Mary's Church, Baldock, Hertfordshire (1799–1880)

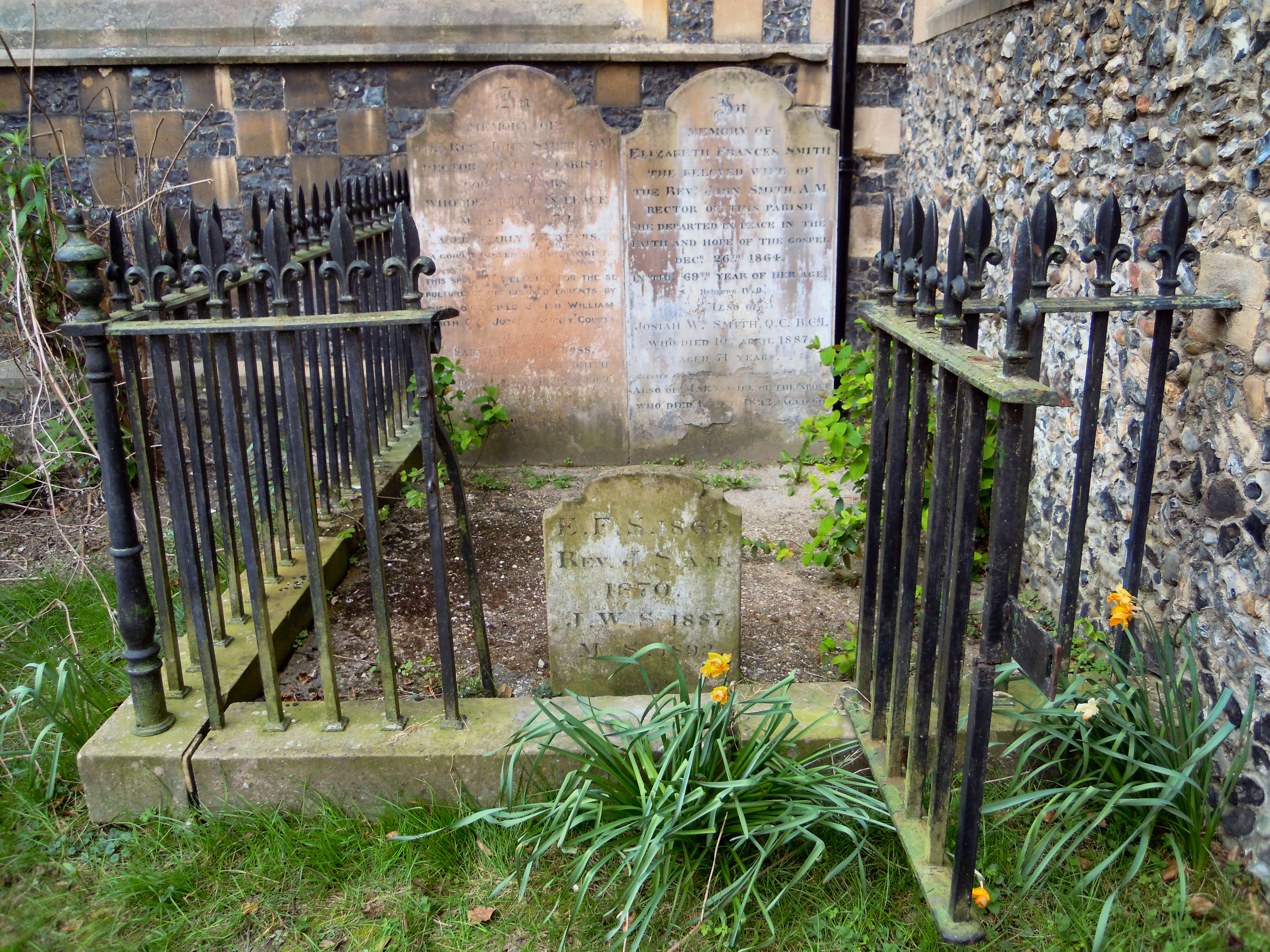
The grave of Rev. John Smith (left) and his son Josiah William Smith (right) in the churchyard of St Mary's church in Baldock

John Smith (1799 – 3 March 1870) was the rector of St Mary's church in Baldock in Hertfordshire and is noted for being the first person to transcribe the Diary of Samuel Pepys.

Smith was the first to decipher the complete text of the Diary of Samuel Pepys while a student at Magdalene College, Cambridge, where the Diary is kept (others had previously deciphered sections of it). Smith laboured on the Diaries for three years, from 1819 to 1822, and had assumed that they were written in code. He broke the code by comparing the section in the Diary concerning the escape of Charles II from Worcester Castle with the longhand version of the same event Pepys published later. Later Smith was told that the diary was actually written in a shorthand system devised by Thomas Skelton and that the textbook Pepys learnt it from was on the bookshelf above Smith's head. Smith's transcription, which is kept in the Pepys Library, was the basis for the first published edition of the diary, edited by Lord Braybrooke, released in two volumes in 1825.

Smith also worked on other material by Pepys, transcribing the so-called Tangier Diary of 1683 in the Bodleian Library.

== Personal life ==
Smith married Elizabeth Frances Smith (c1795-1864) and with her had a son, Josiah William Smith QC (1816-1887), Judge of County Courts.

Smith was Rector at St Mary's in Baldock from 1832 to 1870 and is buried beside his wife and son in the churchyard.
