= Church of St Mary the Virgin, Baldock =

Church in Hertfordshire, England

Coordinates: 51.9897°N 0.1898°W

St Mary the Virgin, Baldock
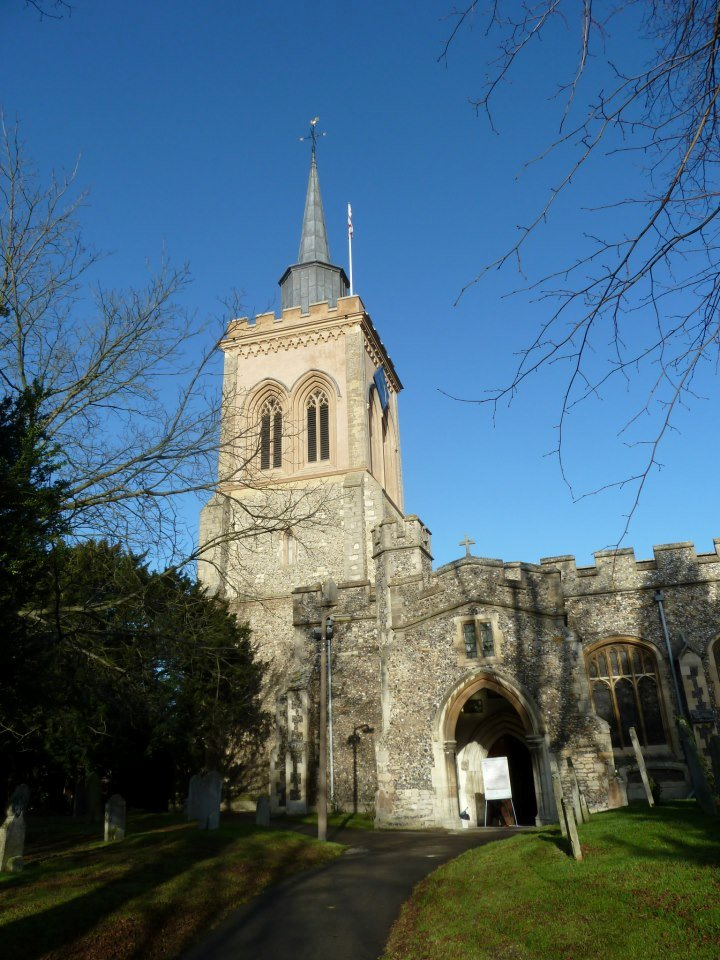
- St Mary the Virgin, Baldock
- OS grid reference: TL 24396 33905
- Location: Baldock
- Country: England
- Denomination: Church of England
- Previous denomination: Roman Catholic

History
- Dedication: St Mary

Architecture
- Heritage designation: Grade I listed

Administration
- Province: Canterbury
- Diocese: St Albans

The Church of St Mary the Virgin is a parish church of the Church of England in Baldock in Hertfordshire. Dedicated to the Virgin Mary, the original church on the site dated to about 1150 and was built by the Knights Templar before being largely rebuilt in about 1330 by the Knights Hospitaller. It is a Grade I listed building.

== History of St Mary's ==
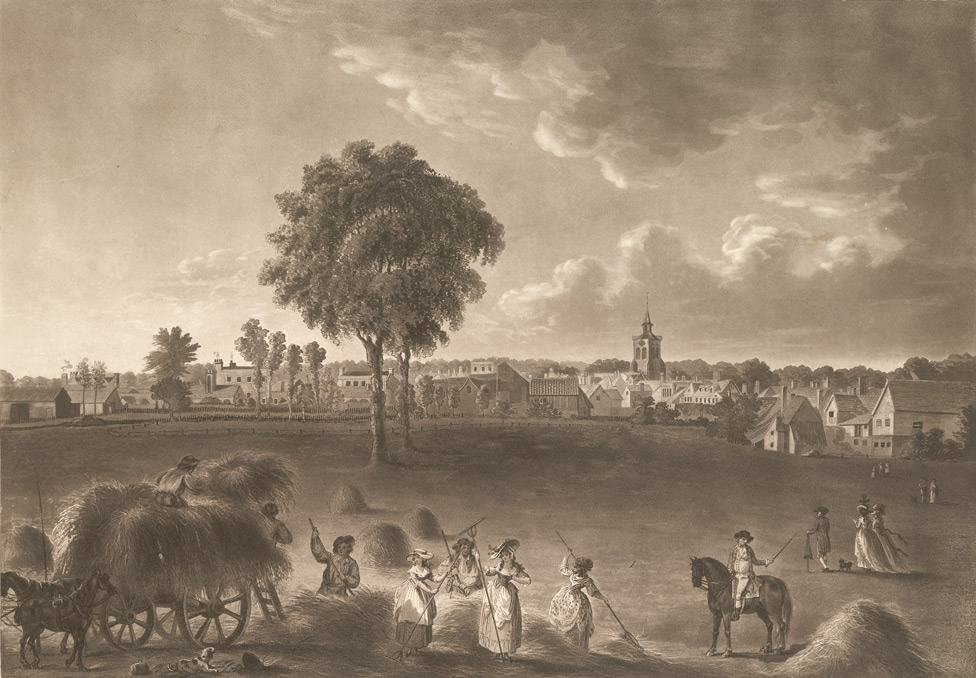
A view of Baldock in 1787 showing St Mary's church

The advowson or patronage of the church of St. Mary at Baldock originally belonged to the Knights Templar, who built the original church in about 1150 on land given to them by Gilbert de Clare, the Earl of Pembroke (parts of this early church are found at the east end of the chancel), and it continued in their possession until their suppression in 1308. It was then granted, together with the manor of Baldock, to the Knights Hospitaller, who expanded it in about 1330 and who in 1335 granted the advowson for ten years to John de Blomvill. The latter in 1343 granted it for two years to Sir Walter de Manny, after which it presumably reverted to the Hospitallers.

In 1359 it was claimed by the Crown as parcel of the Holy Trinity church of Weston. There seems no reason why Edward III should have claimed either church at that time, for both belonged to the Hospitallers; however, his claim seems to have been allowed, for the Crown presented to the church in 1383, and apparently continued to do so until after 1822. The patronage was transferred before 1829 to the Lord Chancellor. The latter held it until 1865, when it was transferred to the Bishop of Rochester, who presented until 1877, when it was acquired by the Bishop of St Albans. Since 1902 the presentation has been in the hands of the bishop and the Marquess of Salisbury alternately.

The Fraternity or Gild of Jesus at St Mary's in Baldock was founded in 1459, and the charter confirmed in 1533. At that date it had a master, churchwardens, brethren and sisters, and found a priest who helped the parson of the church in his duties. At the inquiry of 1548 William Tybie was the brotherhood priest, and he assisted the parson of Baldock in serving his cure. In 1550 it was granted, with the lands belonging, to John Cock.

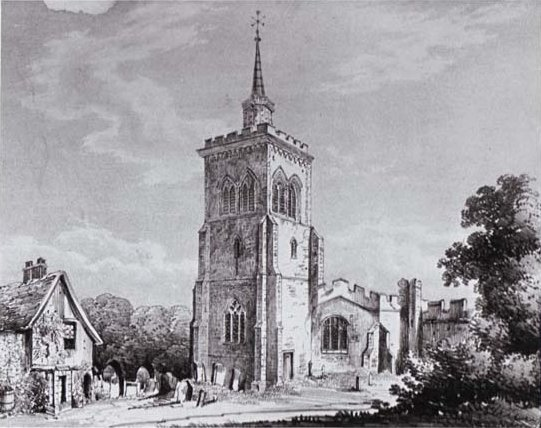
St Mary's church in 1852

Among the church's silverware is a silver and parcel-gilt chalice and paten dated to the reign of Elizabeth I (hallmarked 1569) known as the Byrd Chalice, named after the Reverend Josias Byrd (c.1578-1666), Rector of the church from 1613 to 1662. Byrd is remembered for giving Charles I a drink of wine from this chalice when he passed through Baldock, en route from Newmarket to London under the escort of Cornet George Joyce in June 1647. The following inscription was on Byrd's gravestone which stood in the churchyard for 200 years, but which has subsequently disappeared:

'Josiah Byrd lies buried here
Who taught this parish three-and-fifty year
Aged he was, as I have heard some say.
He was eighty eight before he passed away.
And died in the year
When one and sixes three made up the Quere.'

For a time Byrd's assistant or lecturer was William Sherwin, who was either silenced or ejected. The church's plate also includes a cup and cover paten of 1629.

The Rev. John Smith, Rector of the church from 1832 to 1870 and who is buried in the churchyard, was the first to decipher the complete text of the Diary of Samuel Pepys (others had previously deciphered sections of it). Smith laboured on the Diaries for three years, from 1819 to 1822. His transcription, which is kept in the Pepys Library, was the basis for the first published edition of the diary, edited by Lord Braybrooke, released in two volumes in 1825.

The 19th century rectory beside the church, built in 1871 and known today as 'Butterfield House', was designed by the noted ecclesiastical architect William Butterfield. Today it is a nursery, while a rather more modest modern rectory is located in Pond Lane.

St Mary's has two church schools - St Mary's Infant and St Mary's Junior Schools, which share a common site on St Mary's Way in Baldock.

The parapsychologist Peter Underwood married in the church in 1944.

== Structure and fabric of the church ==
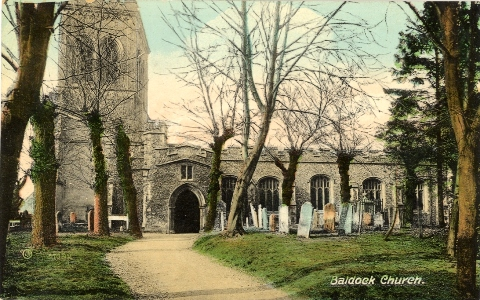
St Mary's church in 1907

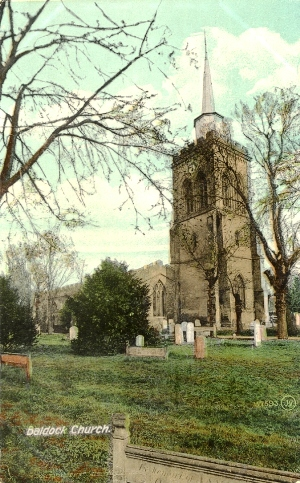
St Mary's church with spire in 1907

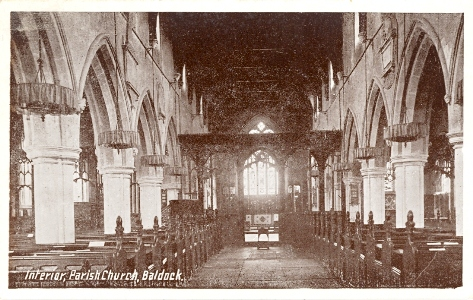
The nave looking towards the chancel c.1923

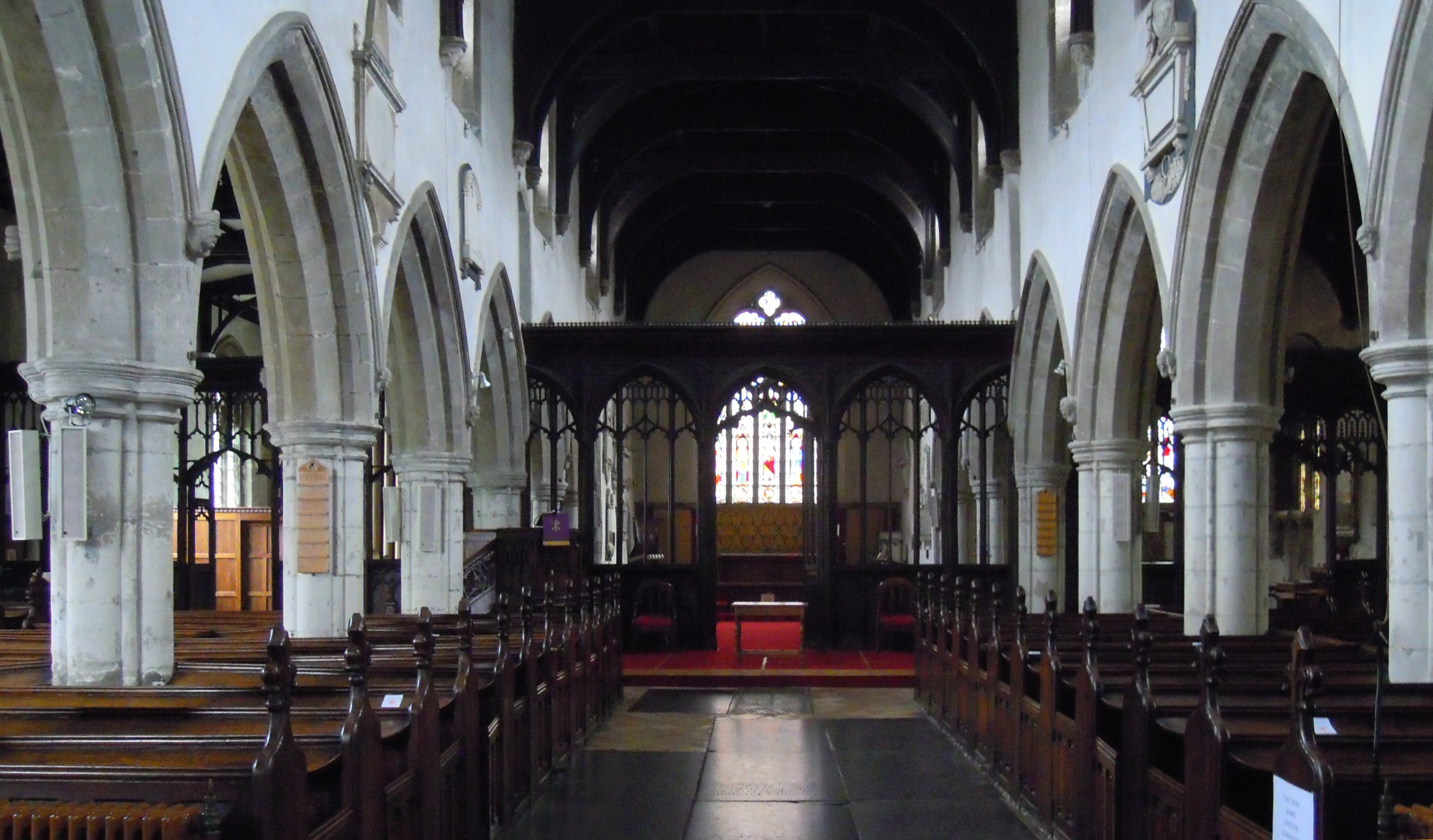
The same view in 2014

The church is built of flint rubble with stone dressings, while the tower is coated with Roman cement. Pieces of moulding and columns of an earlier building are used in the walls. The roofs of the north chapel and north aisle are of slate, and those of the rest of the church of lead.

The church consists of a chancel, north and south chapels, nave, north and south aisles, west tower, and north and south porches. The whole of the church and the tower have embattled parapets, and the tower is surmounted by a leaden spire on an octagonal drum on top of which is a gold weathervane in the shape of a cockerel.

The south chapel was begun in the last part of the 14th century and completed in the early 15th century. The south window is of three lights with restored tracery. Between it and the south-east corner is a piscina and sedilia of the 13th century. The flat head is probably 19th century. There are traces visible externally on the east and north walls of windows probably dating from the early part of the 13th century.

The south aisle has three 15th-century windows in the south wall and one in the west wall, all of three lights with repaired tracery. The south doorway of the 14th century is to the west of the three windows, and to the west of it is a small 15th-century doorway, formerly leading to the staircase of the parvise. The oak door of this doorway is of the 15th century with a scutcheon for a ring. The south porch has two-light windows on the east and west containing restored Victorian stained glass windows. The north-west angle stair turret and the floor of the parvise have been removed, and the porch is now open to the roof.

The north aisle has three 15th-century windows of three lights with restored tracery, and north door to the west of them dating to 1826, in the north wall. This door opens to the north porch, which was substantially repaired and altered in 1826. The west window of three lights has for the most part modern stonework, but a few old stones remain. The statue of the Virgin Mary with Child on the north wall was given to the church in memory of the Very Rev. Albert Victor Baillie, Dean of Windsor, who died in Baldock in 1955. The statue, by Sir William Reid Dick, had been presented to Baillie on his retirement from Windsor.

The clerestory was made in the 15th century, and the parvise was added at the same time, when the church was re-roofed. The 19th century saw major improvement to some of the roofing and windows, the rebuilding of the spire in 1816 and the North Porch in 1826. Also in the 19th century the whole building was repaired, and the north aisle and north chapel were re-roofed. The belfry stage of the tower was restored in the early 20th century.

A small 19th century porch on the northwest replaces the former rood-loft staircase, but the upper doorway, which is blocked, and part of the lower doorway remain, the latter in the aisle, just outside the screen. At the north-east corner of the chapel is an elaborately carved niche of the 14th century, which must have been moved to its present position in the 15th century, when the wide east window was inserted and the north wall was recessed. On the south side is a 14th-century piscina. No bowl is visible, and a slab was inserted at the back in the 19th century. The communion table in this chapel is of the 17th century.

The nave has six bays of the 14th century and which are slightly different from the two bays of the chancel, the two easternmost being rather lower than the rest. In the north wall is another rood loft door, now blocked. The 15th-century clerestory, which runs continuously above the arcades in both nave and chancel, has seven windows on each side. The roof, also of the 15th century, is precisely like that of the chancel and rests on corbels carved with heads.

The west tower stands at 130 feet to the top of the spire, the lower part of the walls probably dating back to the time of the earliest known church, - circa 1150, but the fine lower arch is 14th century. The west window of three lights is also of the 14th century, with a two-centred rear arch, but the tracery has been much restored in cement, as have the belfry windows also.

Outside the church in the wall of the north aisle is a 14th-century recess with an ogee arch, of which the jambs are restored. Set in the recess is a 14th-century coffin lid with a cross in relief. Also outside in the wall of the south aisle are two recesses, probably of the 15th century, of which the stonework has been renewed.

The lych gate was built in 1871 at the same time as the new rectory, which was designed by noted architect William Butterfield.

== The chancel ==
The east end of the chancel is from the original church on this site and is late 12th century, but the remainder of the chancel, the north chapel (now the vestry), the nave, north and south aisles, west tower, and probably the lower part of the south porch were built about 1330.

The eastern and earlier portion of the chancel has an east window of five lights; under this window on the outside is a 14th-century niche with a trefoiled head, having a rebated edge, and the remains of iron hinges

The late 14th century chancel screen (or rood screen), which is in the same line with those of the chapels, is a fine one in carved oak of three bays, and two half bays at the north and south ends. The screen in the north aisle is 15th century with four narrow bays on either side, while that in the south aisle dates to about 1480, with three bays on either side of the doorway. The 15th-century roof of the chancel has moulded wall plates and ties, trusses, with tracery in the spandrels. The wall plates rest on corbels with carved heads. The Norman and Beard organ was installed in 1913 and was restored in the 1990s.

== Font ==
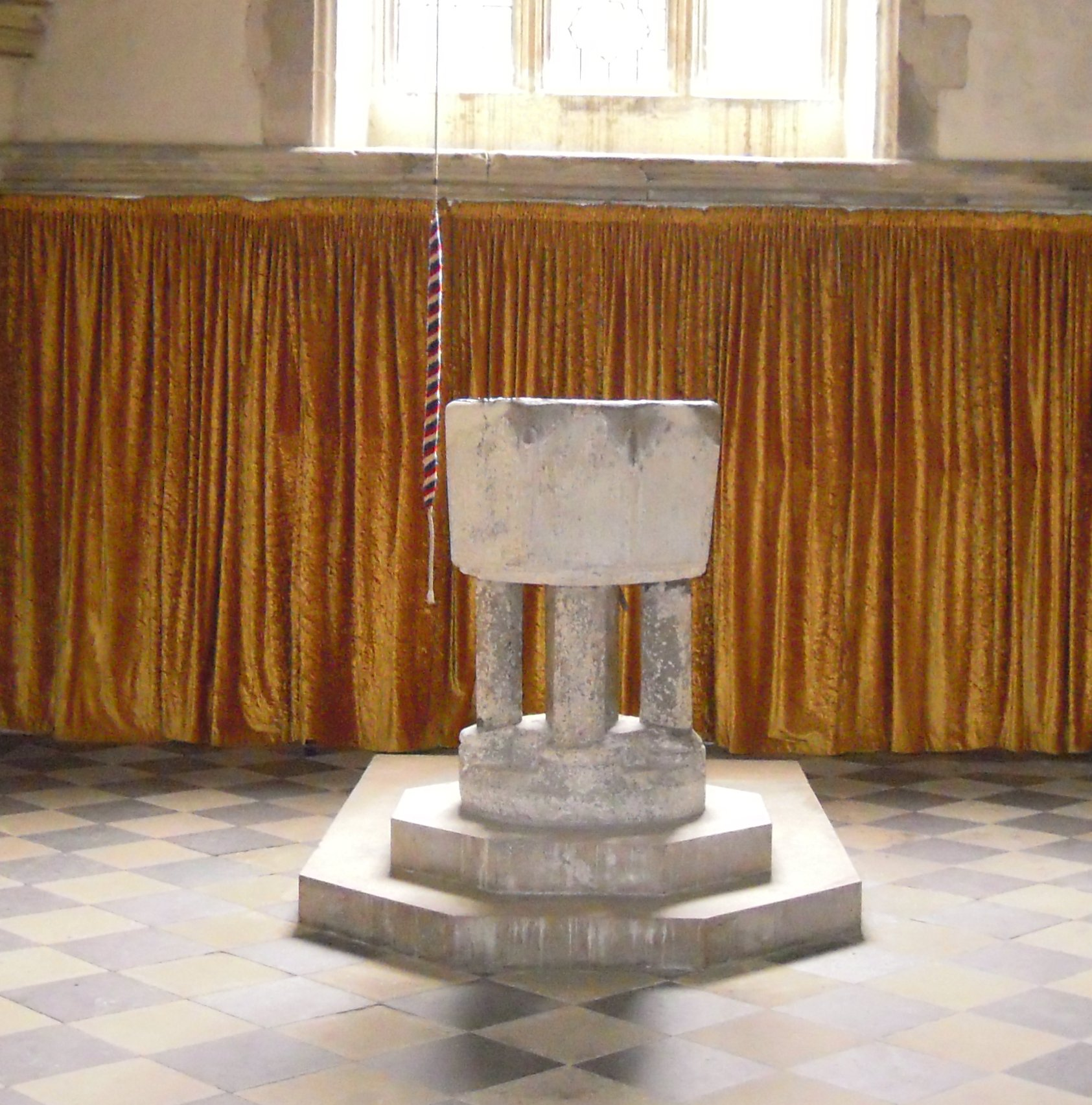
The font is late 12th-century and dates to the earliest church on the site

The font is transitional Norman of the late 12th century, belonging to the earliest known church. It has an octagonal bowl with beaded edges and a circular stem flanked by octagonal shafts with moulded bases. The steps and paving on which it stands are very much later - circa 1901. Beside the font is a strong mediaeval iron-bound chest known as a 'Peter's Pence' chest.

== Brasses and other memorials ==
At the top of the nave in front of the chancel screen is laid a stone slab in memory of Reginald de Argentein (died 1307), believed to be a Knight Templar and who was responsible for rebuilding the church.

Outside the vestry (originally the north chapel) is a Purbeck marble coffin lid of the 13th century, with a cross in relief. On the north wall above this is a brass of a man and his wife, of about 1400; the man is dressed as a forester, and the lower part of his figure, and the dog at his feet, together with the inscription, are missing. On the floor is the brass of a man and his wife, of about 1470. On the north wall are two, one with shrouded figures of a man and his wife, of c.1520, the other an inscription to Margaret Benet, dated 1587.

In the floor at the west end of the nave is a brass with a three-quarter length figure of a nun of about 1400. The inscription plate is gone and in its place is an inscription to a rector of Baldock from 1807. On the floor is also a slab with an indent for a floreated cross. Near the doorway of the north aisle is a slab with an inscription in Gothic capitals, of the 14th century. In the south aisle are the indents of a man and his two wives, of the 15th century.

In the churchyard are the graves of Rev. John Smith, a Rector at Baldock and the first person to completely decipher the Diary of Samuel Pepys beside that of his son Josiah William Smith, an English barrister, legal writer and judge.

== 'Coathanger Window' and other glass ==
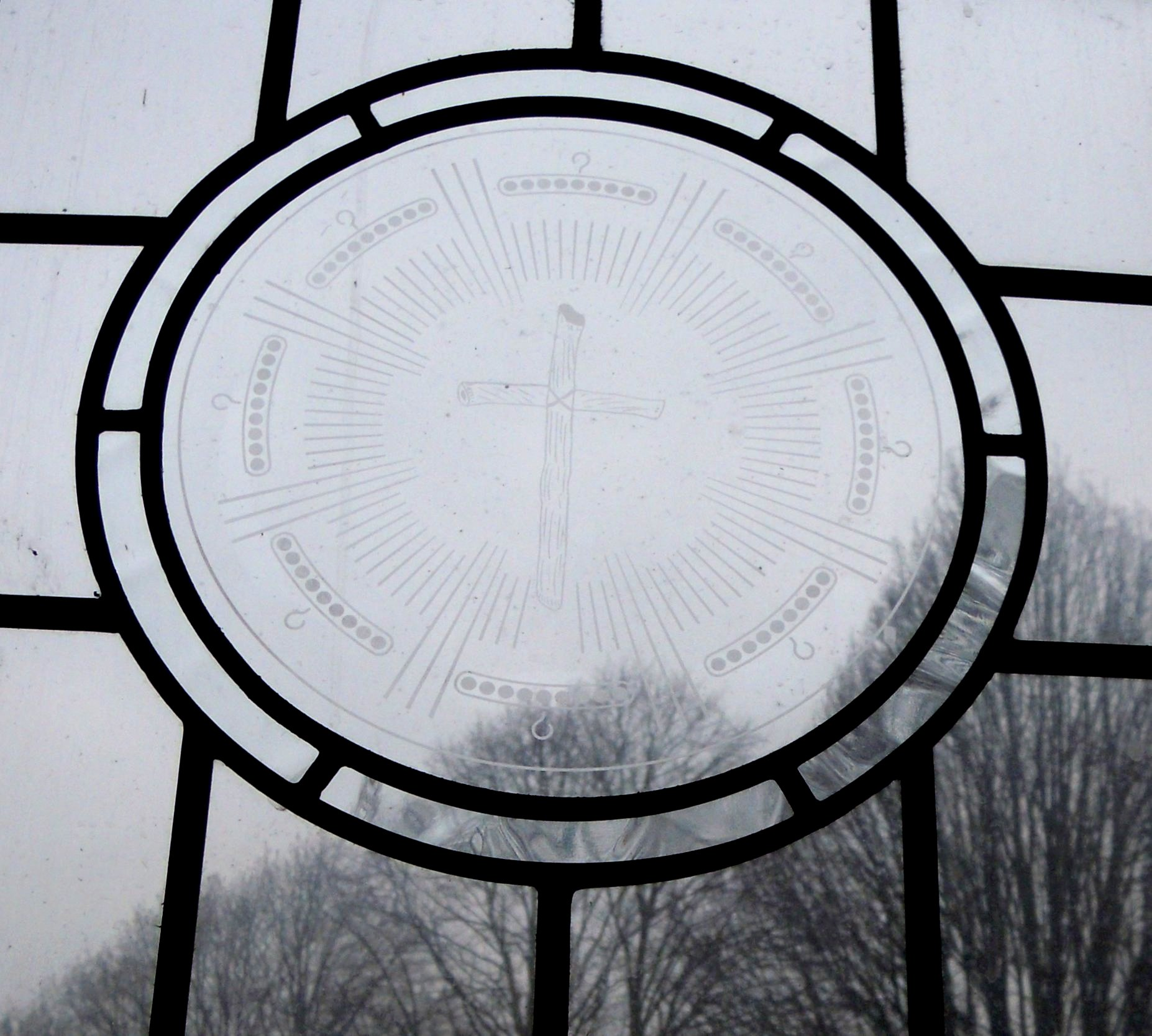
The Coathanger Window

The chancel has a modern east window of five lights, containing fragments of coloured glass at the top, probably of early 15th-century date. The two windows, each of three lights, in the north wall, are of the 15th century, with repaired tracery. The present stained glass is 19th century and shows little artistic merit. The stained glass at the eastern end dates to 1849 and depicts Jesus Christ in the centre, with the Four Evangelists - Matthew, Mark, Luke and John.

In the north aisle is a window by Charles Eamer Kempe dating from 1881. The three windows in clear glass in the north aisle replaced Victorian stained-glass windows which were of poor quality. These windows are unique as they were re-glazed with the proceeds from the sale of covered coat hangers made and sold by Mrs Dorothy Arbury in the 1960s; this act is commemorated by the miniature coat hangers round a cross in the 'Coathanger Window' in the north aisle beside the vestry and dedicated to the memory of Mrs Arbury.

The original 1960s window with its design scratched onto the glass was destroyed by vandals in the late 1990s and was replaced with a new window with the image acid-etched into the glass and designed by the then Churchwarden Glenn Christodoulou.

== Bells and clock ==
The church has a peal of eight bells: (1), (2), (3), (4), (6) and (7) by Taylor of Loughborough in 1882; (5), with inscription 'Miles Graye made me, 1650'; and (8) 'Laudo Deum verum plebem voco, convococlerum defunctos ploro nuptus colo festa docoro. Wm. Goodwyn Jam. Manison ch[urch] wards 1711.

The working parts of the present church clock were made by Messrs. Potts & Sons, of Leeds. It was set in motion on 25 November 1882 and weighs two tons. The Parish records state that the initial cost of the clock was £250. However, there had been a clock in the tower before 1882. There are references in the churchwardens' accounts dated 1711 and again in 1819, where The Vestry Meeting authorised the sum of £55 for repairs to the clock and chimes. The Westminster Chimes ring out the quarter-hour on the 2nd, 3rd, 4th and 7th bells, the hours being struck on the tenor bell. In the Ringing Chamber there is a peal board dating to 1737 and which is said to be one of the earliest in the country.

== Parish registers ==
The original registers are in six books: (i) all entries from 1558 to 1709; (ii) baptisms and burials from 1710 to 1792 and marriages from 1710 to 1753;(iii) baptisms and burials from 1793 to 1812; (iv)(v) and (vi) marriages from 1754 to 1788, 1788 to 1804, and 1804 to 1812, respectively. These are now at the Hertfordshire Archives and Local Studies.

== Notable burials ==
- Rev. Josias Byrd (c.1578-1666), Rector of Baldock remembered for giving Charles I a drink when he passed through Baldock. Location of grave now lost.
- Rev. John Smith (1799-1870), Rector at Baldock and the first person to decipher the Diary of Samuel Pepys
- Josiah William Smith (1816-1887), son of the above, an English barrister, legal writer and judge.

== Gallery ==
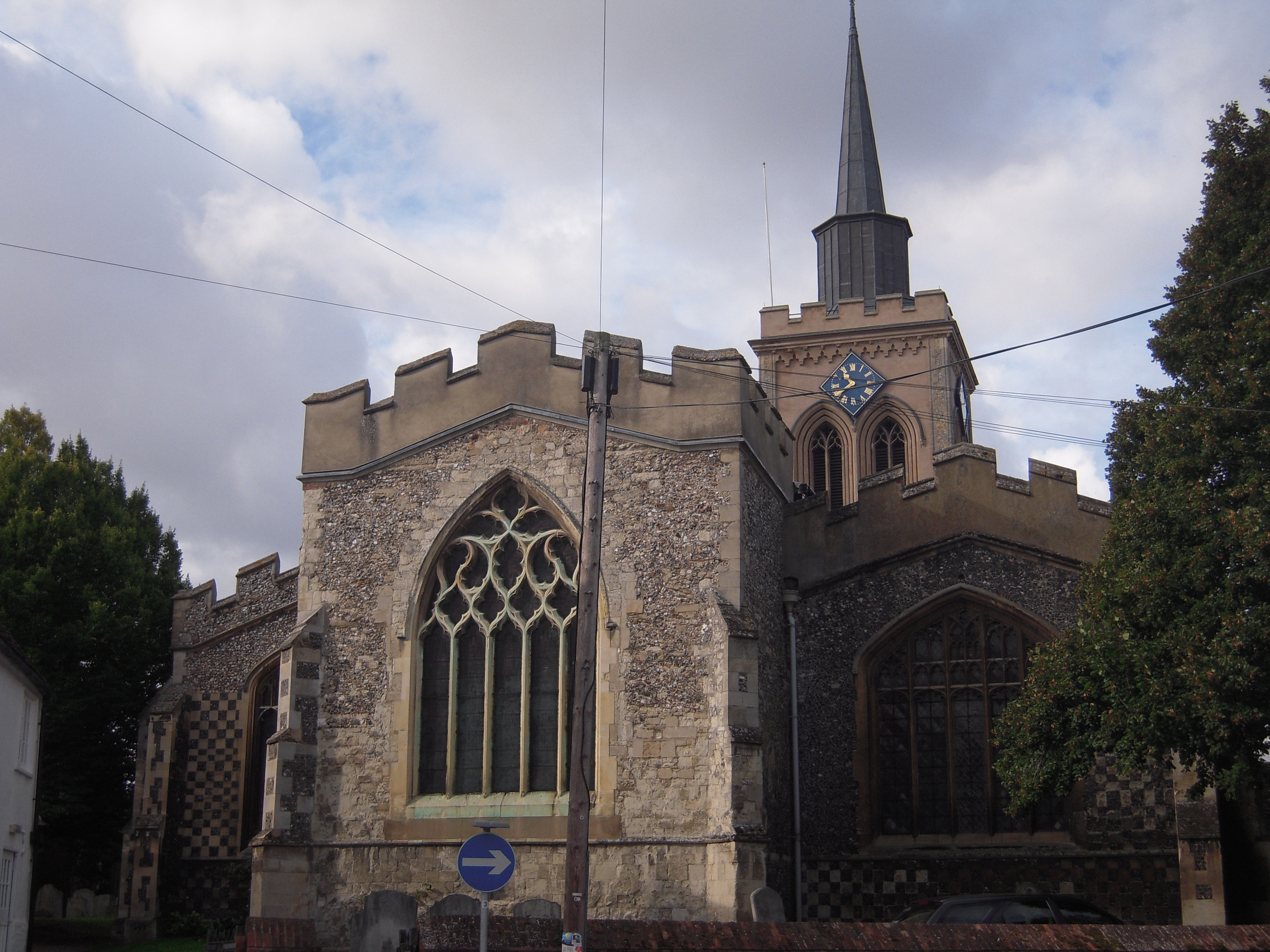
The East window

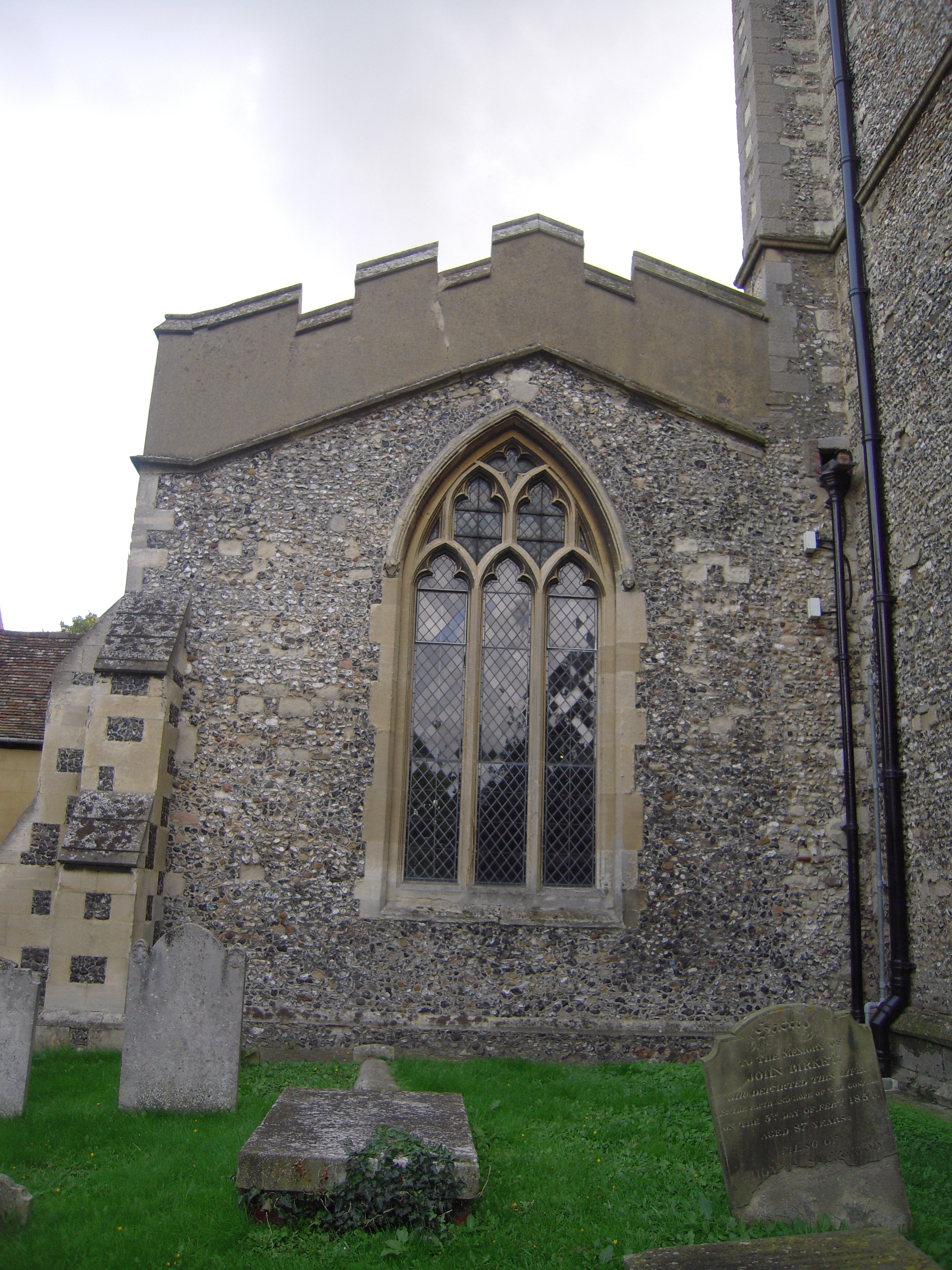
Window of the South Chapel

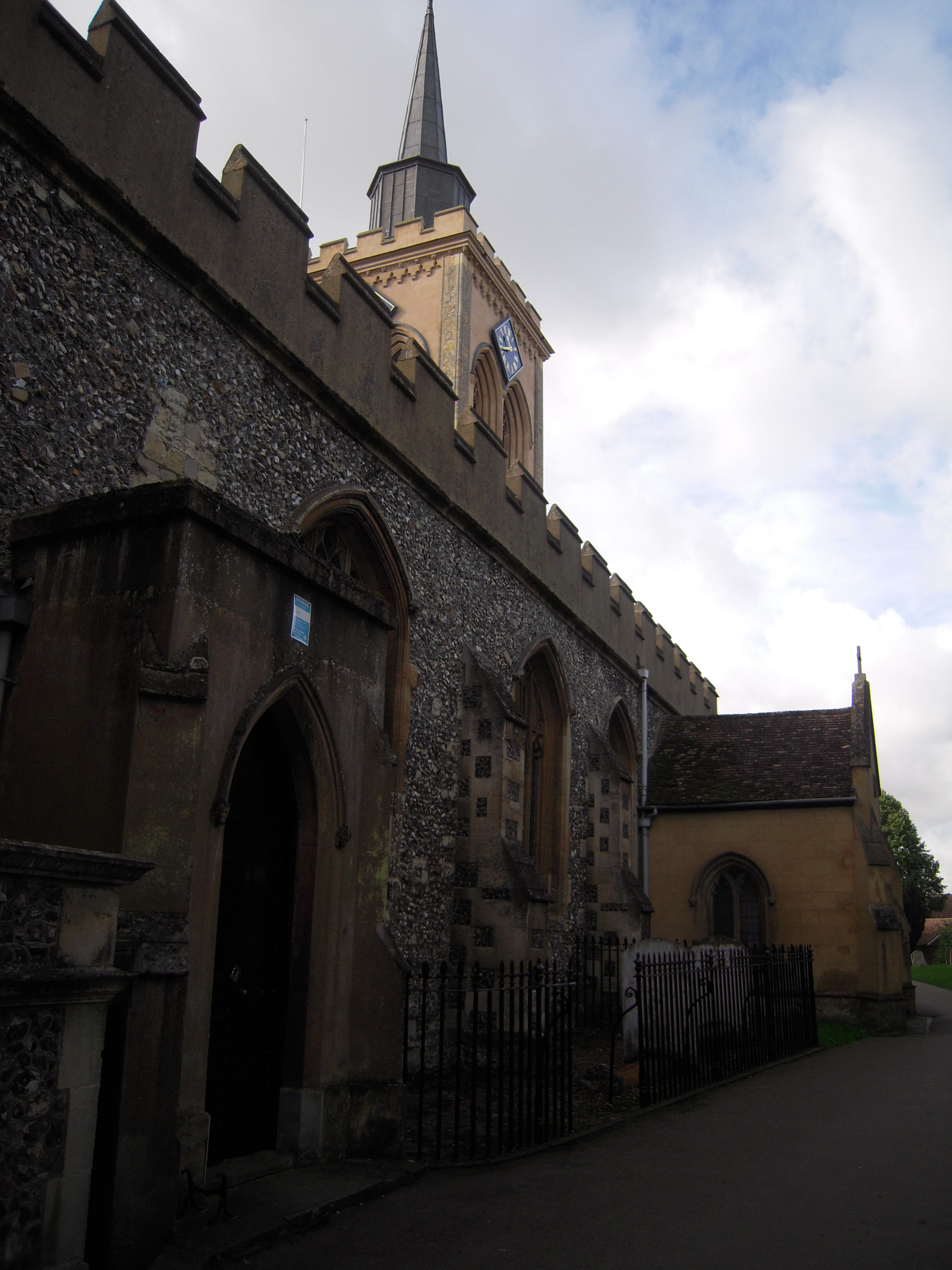
Exterior view

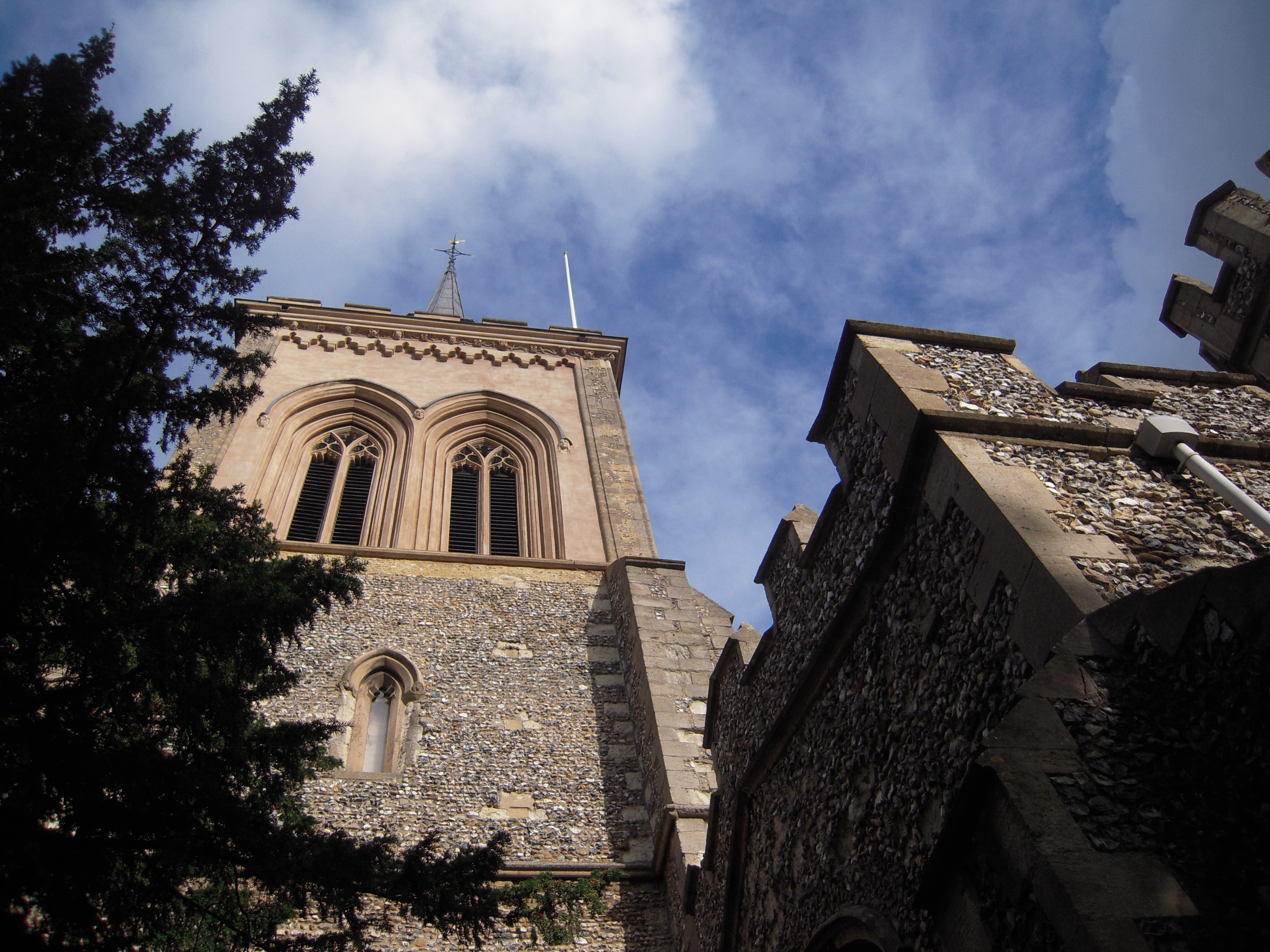
Exterior view

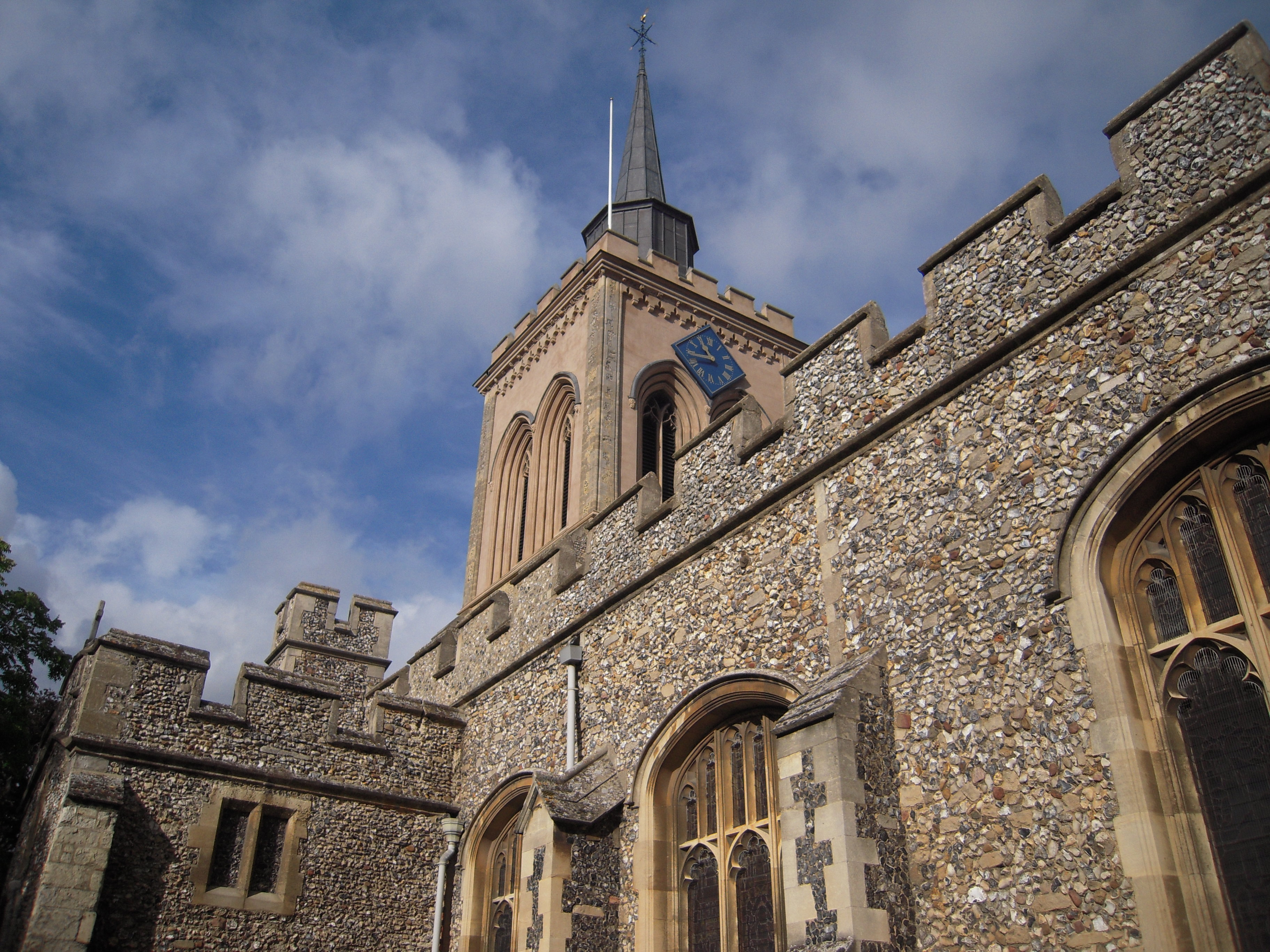
Exterior view

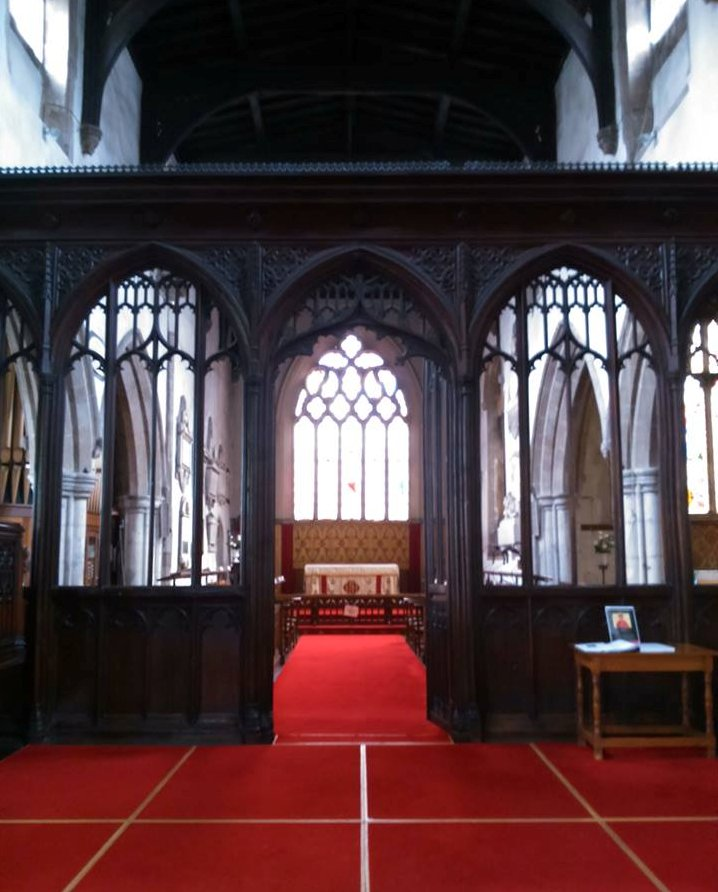
The chancel and rood screen in 2014

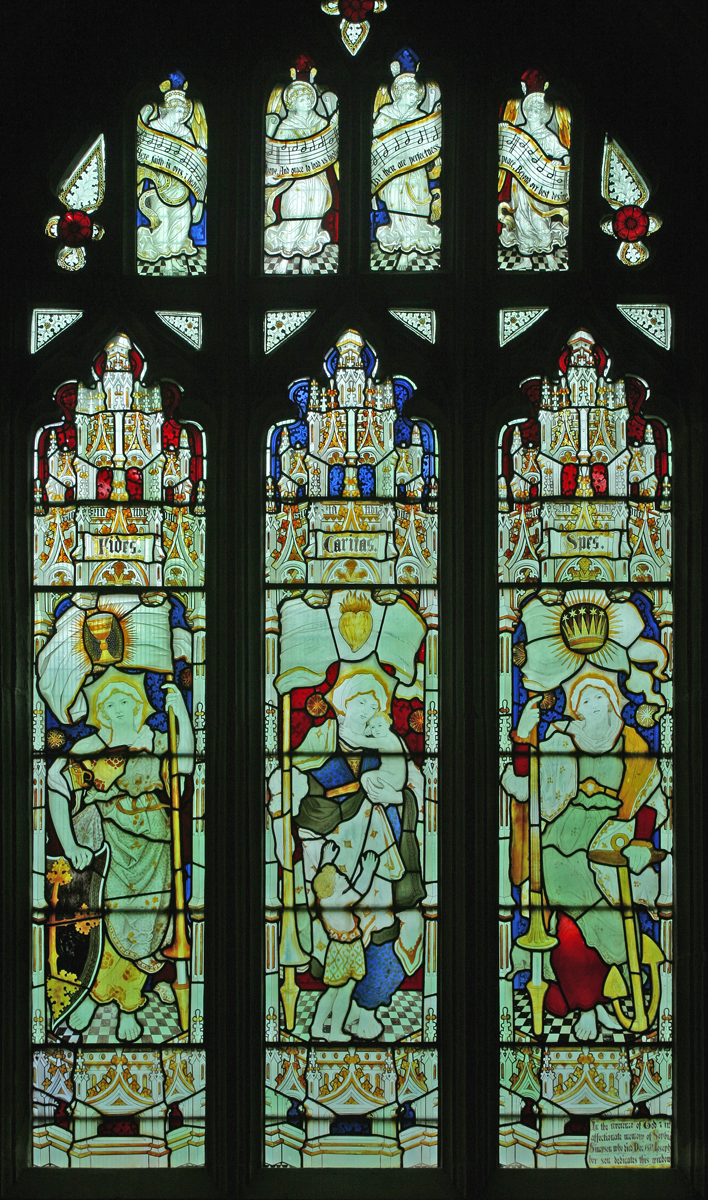
Window by Charles Eamer Kempe showing Faith, Hope and Charity

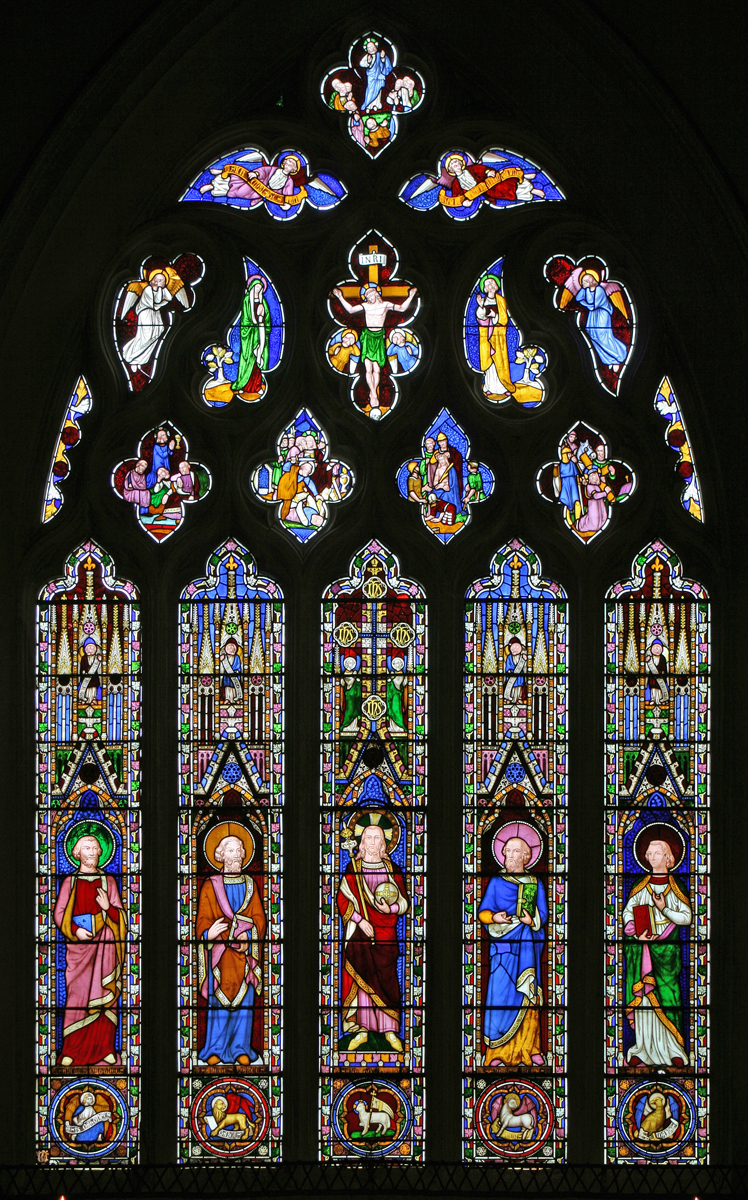
East Window showing Christ with the Four Evangelists

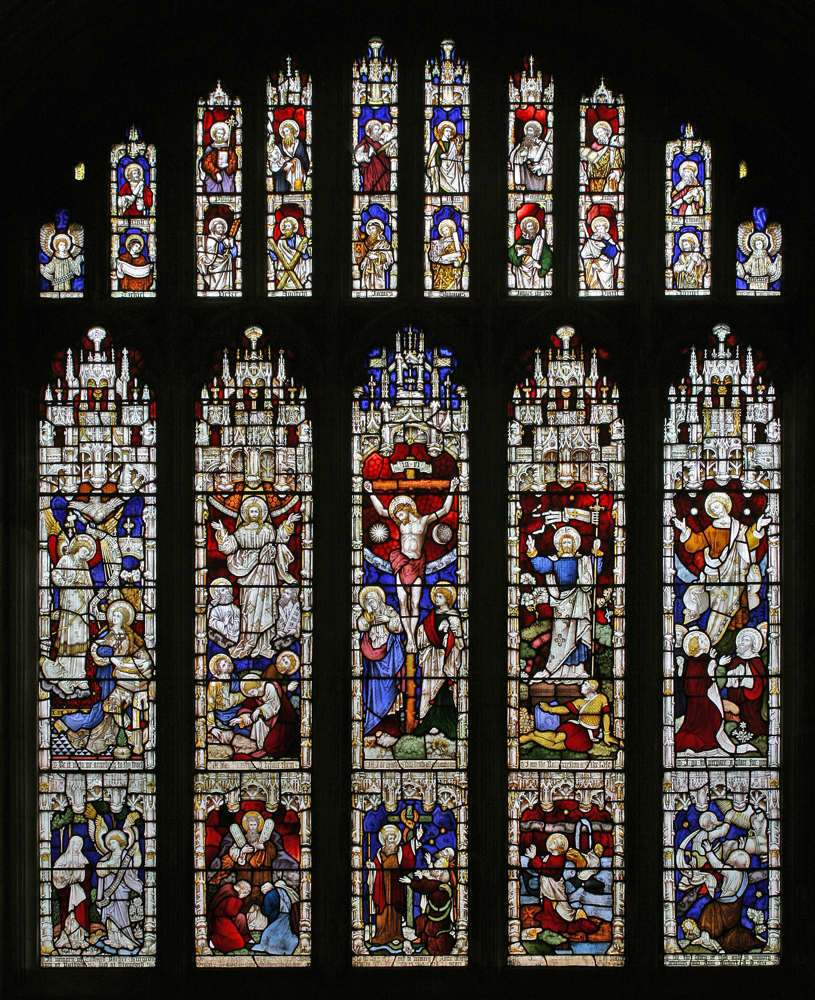
Window in the South Aisle Chapel showing Christ's Crucifixion and Resurrection

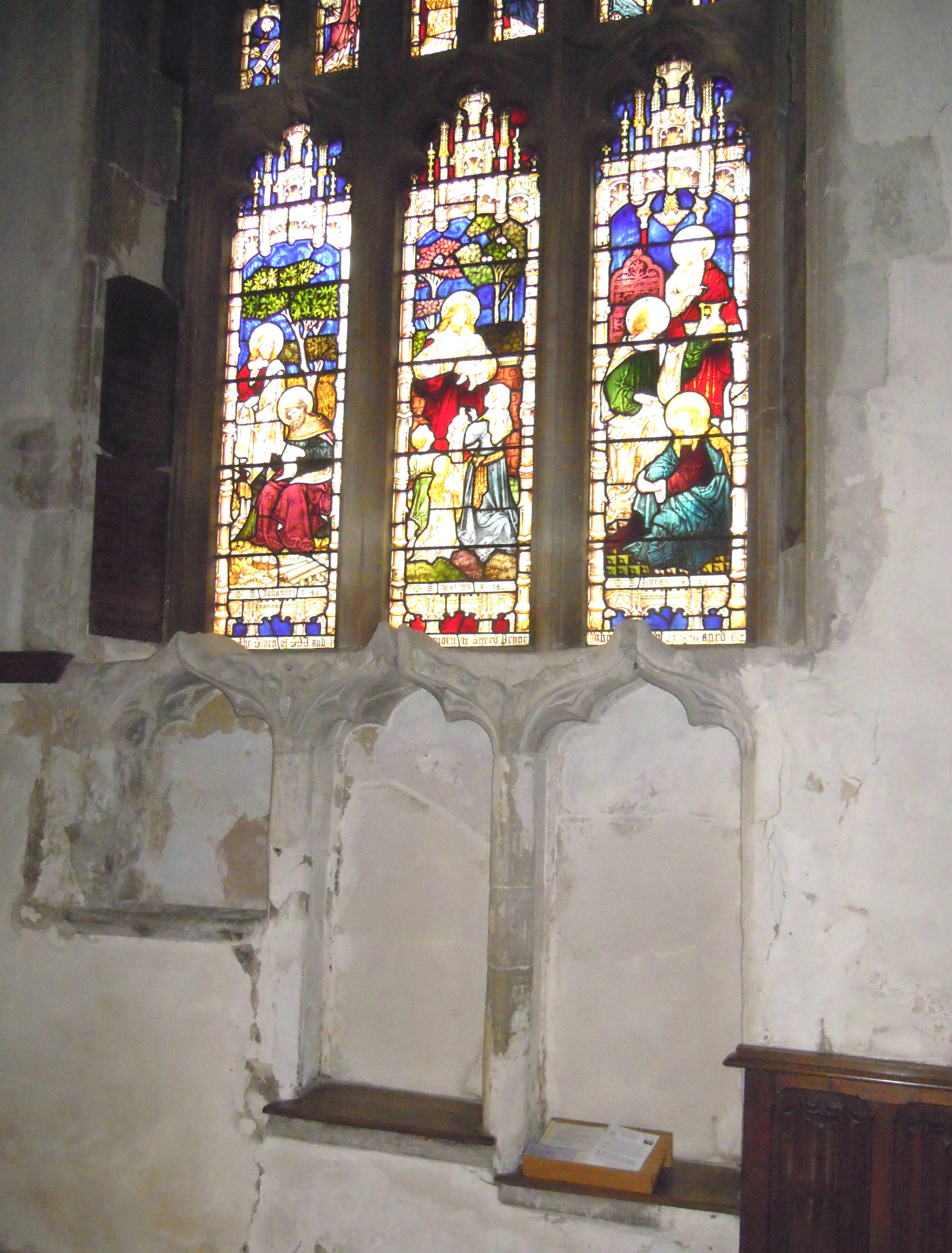
The Piscina and Sedilia in the South Chapel

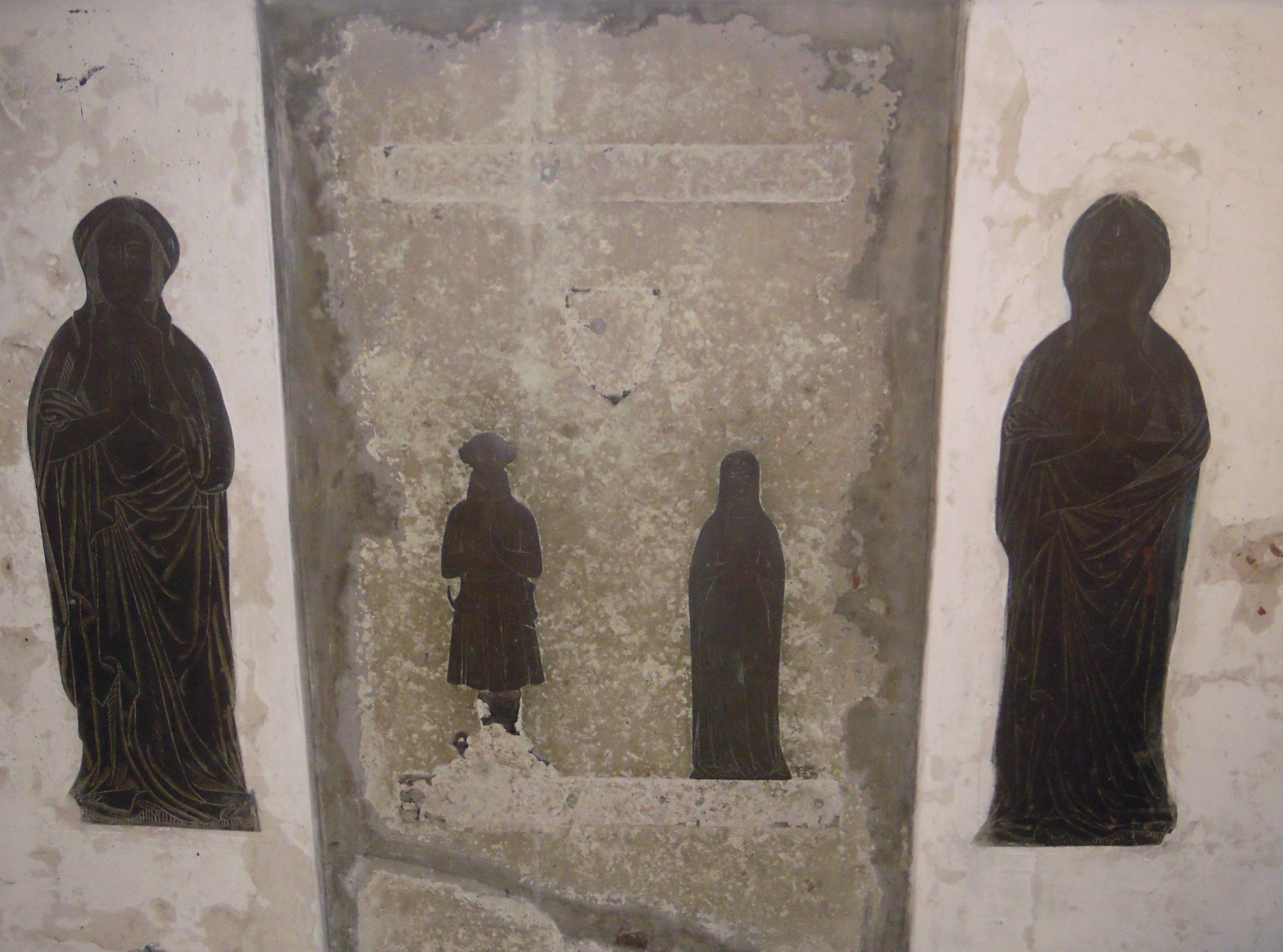
Memorial Brasses on the North Wall

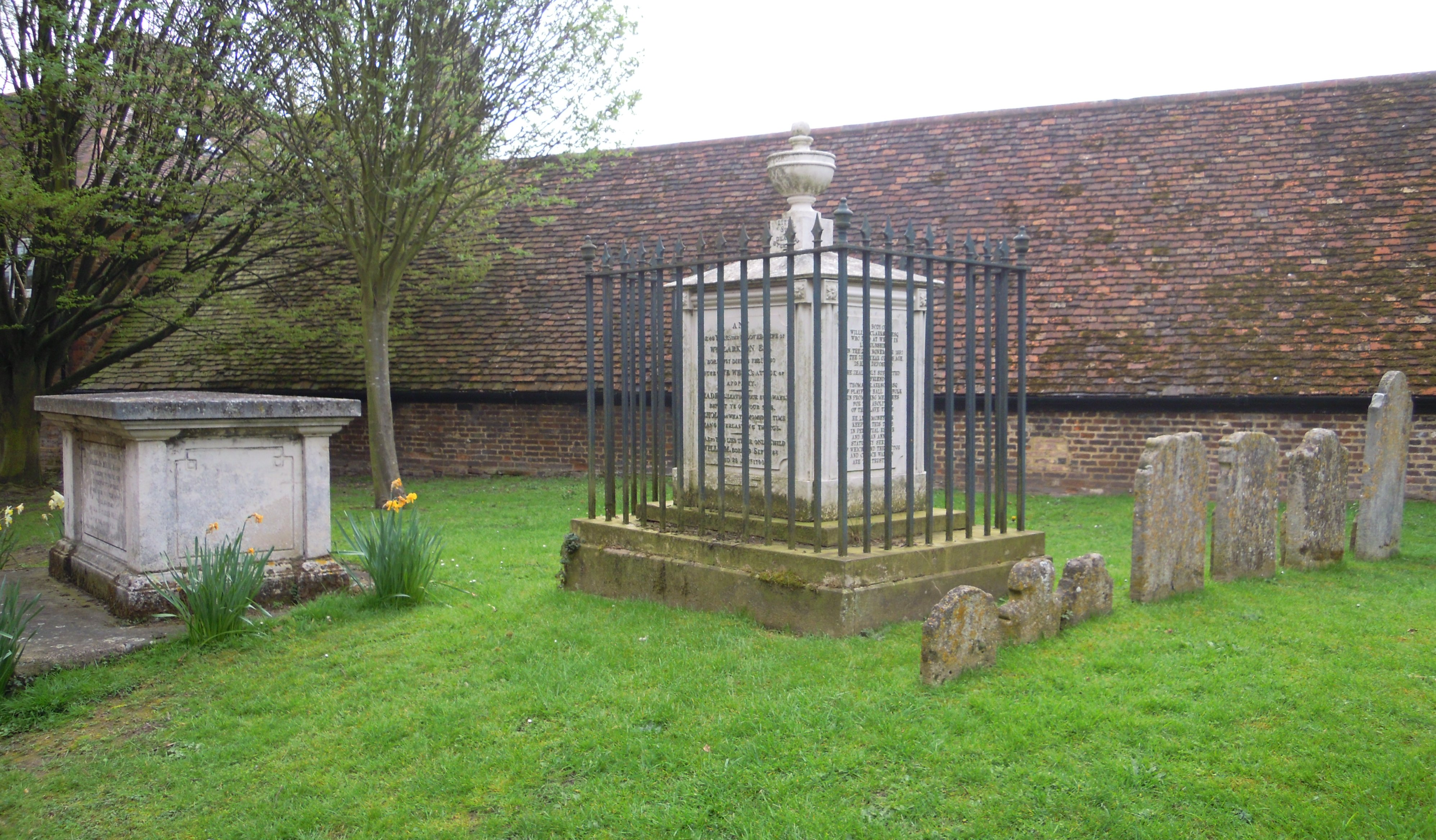
Unusual iron tomb in the churchyard to William Clarkson

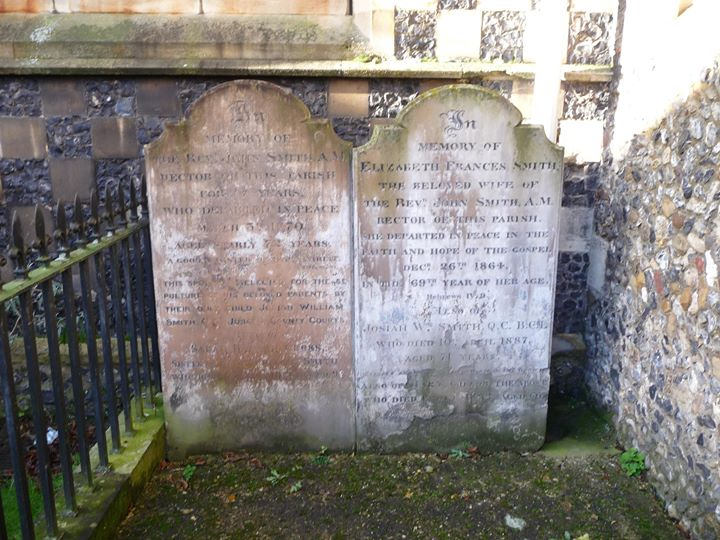
Grave of Rev John Smith, Rector from 1832 to 1870 and his son Josiah William Smith QC

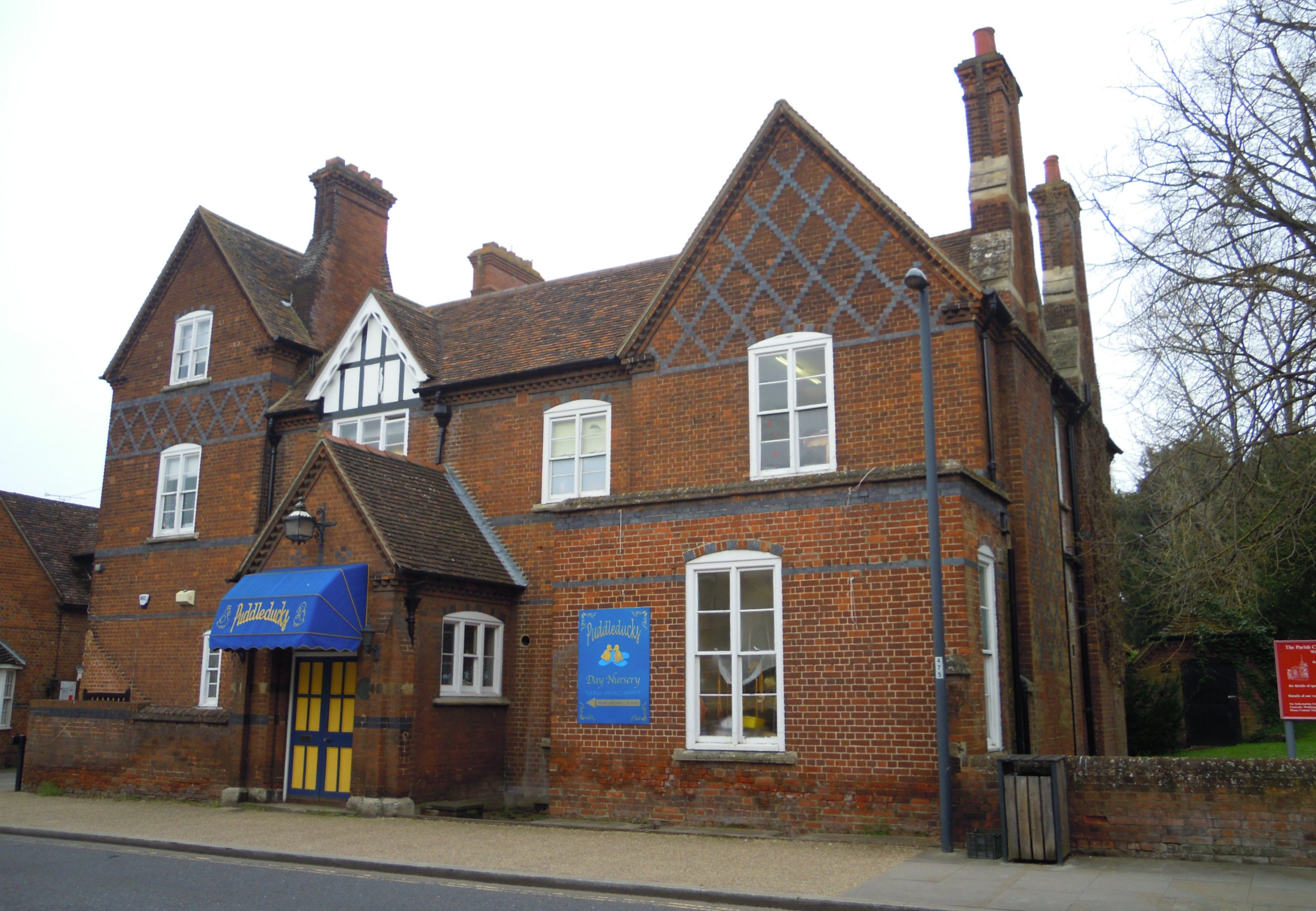
The former Rectory, designed by William Butterfield

== Publications ==
- A Day for St Mary's Publisher: Baldock Parochial Church Council (1984)
- Maconochie, Christopher, New Days for St Mary's: The Church Hall Story Publisher: Baldock Parochial Church Council (1986)
- Gray, H.J., The Church of St. Mary the Virgin Baldock, Herts - The British Publishing Company Limited, Gloucester (ND - c1960)
