= Hinxworth =

Village in Hertfordshire, England

Coordinates: 52.049°N 0.199°W

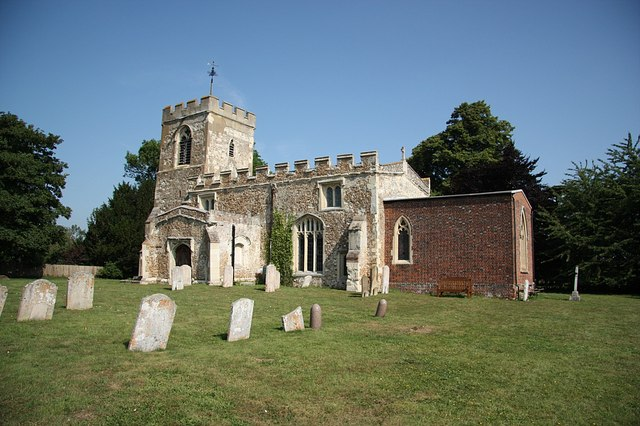
- St.Nicholas' church, Hinxworth

- Location within Hertfordshire
- Population: 326 (Parish, 2021)
- OS grid reference: TL236405
- District: North Hertfordshire
- Shire county: Hertfordshire
- Region: East
- Country: England
- Sovereign state: United Kingdom
- Post town: Baldock
- Postcode district: SG7
- Dialling code: 01462
- Police: Hertfordshire
- Fire: Hertfordshire
- Ambulance: East of England
- UK Parliament: North East Hertfordshire

Hinxworth is a village and civil parish in North Hertfordshire, England. It sits just off the Great North Road between Baldock and Biggleswade. It has a village hall, a park, a pub, a small church, a bus stop and a post box. At the 2021 census the parish had a population of 326.

== History and geography ==
The name of the village has variously been recorded as Haingesteworde, Hainsteworde, Hamsteworde (in the 11th century); Hingslewurd (12th century); Hengsteworth, Hyngstrigge, Heynceworth (13th century); Hangteworth, Hynxworth (14th century); Hyggextworth, Hyngxtworth (15th century); and Henxworth (16th century).

The parish of Hinxworth is in the extreme north of the county on the border with Bedfordshire. It lies low, the ground nowhere rising more than 172 ft (52 m) above mean sea level. The ancient track called The Ridgeway crosses the low land to the east of the parish, running parallel with the River Rhee, which forms the north-east boundary. The area of the parish is 1,463 acres (5.92 km^{2}), most of which is arable land, the remainder woodland and pasture. The soil is loam and blue clay, the subsoil varies. The chief crops are wheat, barley, field beans and oilseed rape. Coprolites have been dug in the parish and are still to be found. An Act authorizing enclosure of the common fields was passed in 1802 and the award was made in 1806.

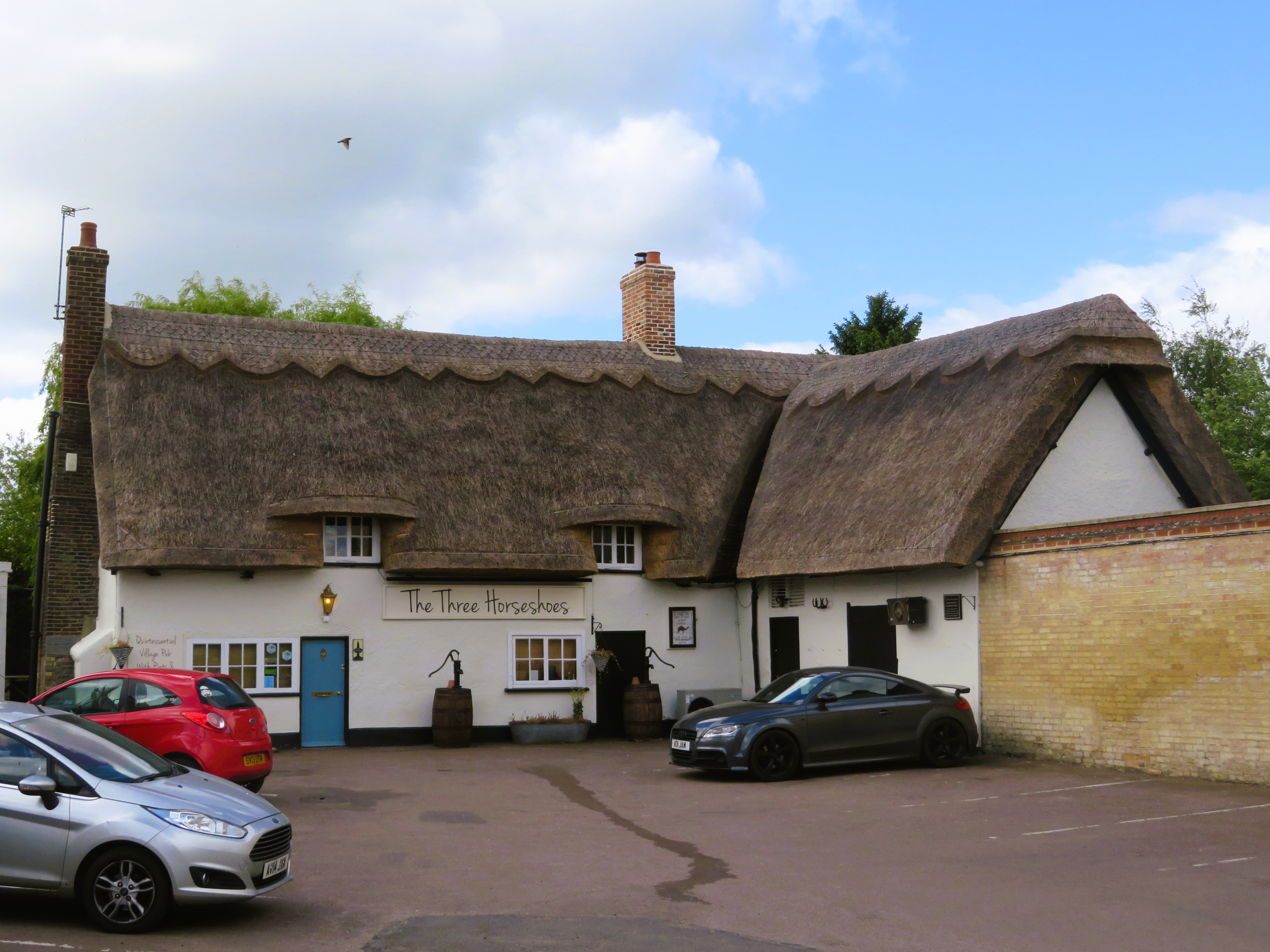
The Three Horseshoes, High Street

The nearest railway stations are Baldock, 5 miles (8.0 km) to the south and Ashwell 6 miles (9.7 km) to the southeast, both on the Hitchin and Cambridge branch of the Great Northern Railway.

The Great North Road skirts the parish on the west and forms its southwest boundary. Not far from this road, on the borders of Hinxworth and Caldecote, Roman remains were discovered in about 1720 by workmen who were digging there for gravel with which to repair the road. These included several human bodies, urns, paterae and other objects, with a Danish or Dutch coin. In 1810 a further find of great interest was made in the parish of two rare Greek coins or medals, one of Mithridates King of Pontus, and the other of Perseus King of Macedonia, both very well preserved.

Near the River Rhee in the north of the parish and not far from the camp at Arbury Banks or Harboro, and near the Ridgeway, a hoard of more than 500 Roman coins was discovered. Near them were found other Roman remains.

The village of Hinxworth lies a mile and a half to the east of the Roman road, with which it is connected by roads leading northwest and southwest, the former continuing to Ashwell. The 14th century St Nicholas' church and former rectory stand on the southeast of the angle formed by the road to Ashwell and that leading southwest to the Roman road, and the village lies a little to the northwest of the church.

The Three Horseshoes public house on High Street has its origins in a 15th-century hall house.

At the beginning of the 18th century, it had only thirty-five houses, of which three were almshouses.

Hinxworth is home to 'Hinxworth Archers', one of the few Archery clubs in the area.

The medieval manor house Hinxworth Place is about half a mile southwest of the village.

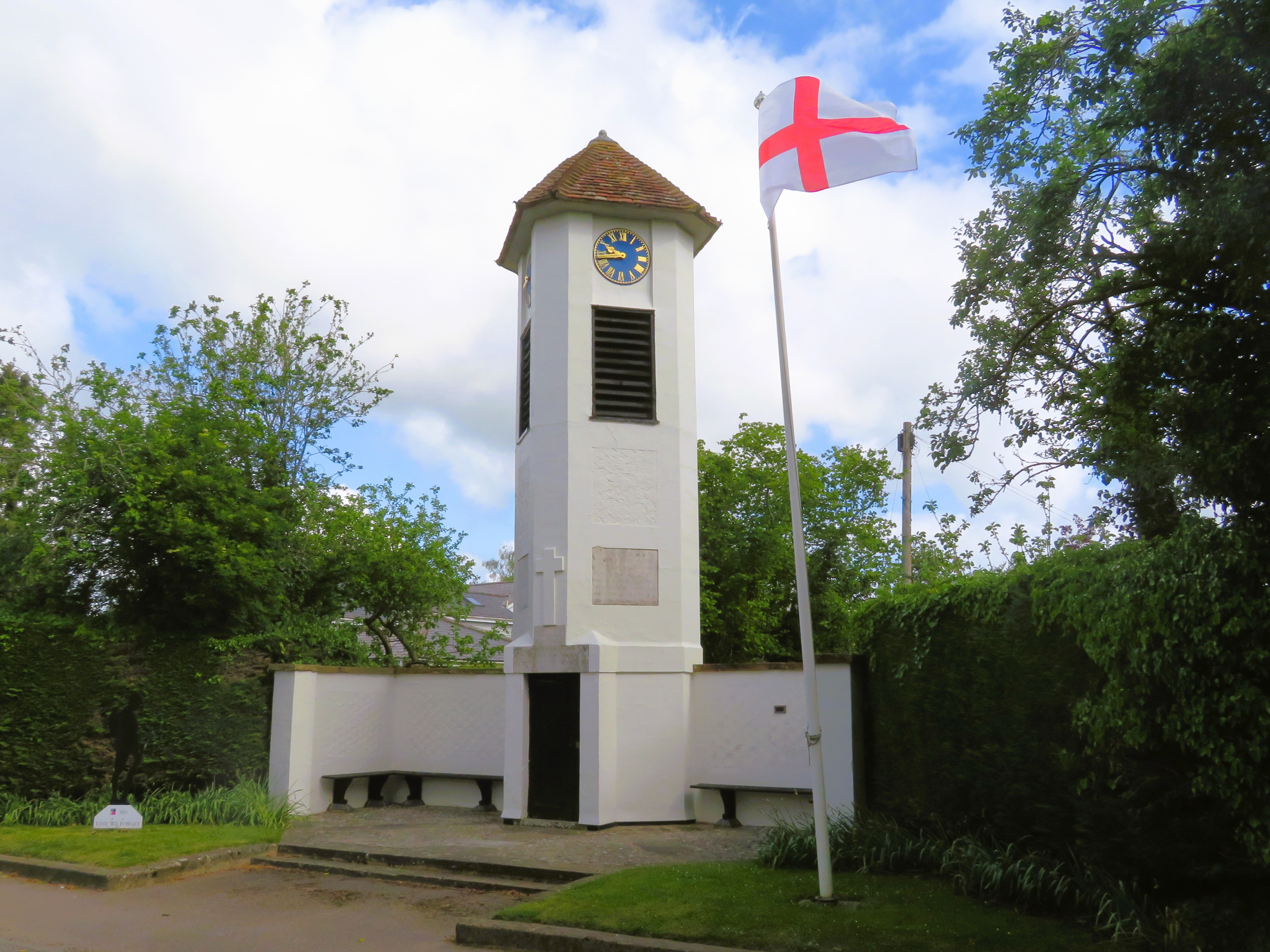
War Memorial, High Street

Hinxworth's war memorial is in the form of a clock tower on the High Street.

== Governance ==
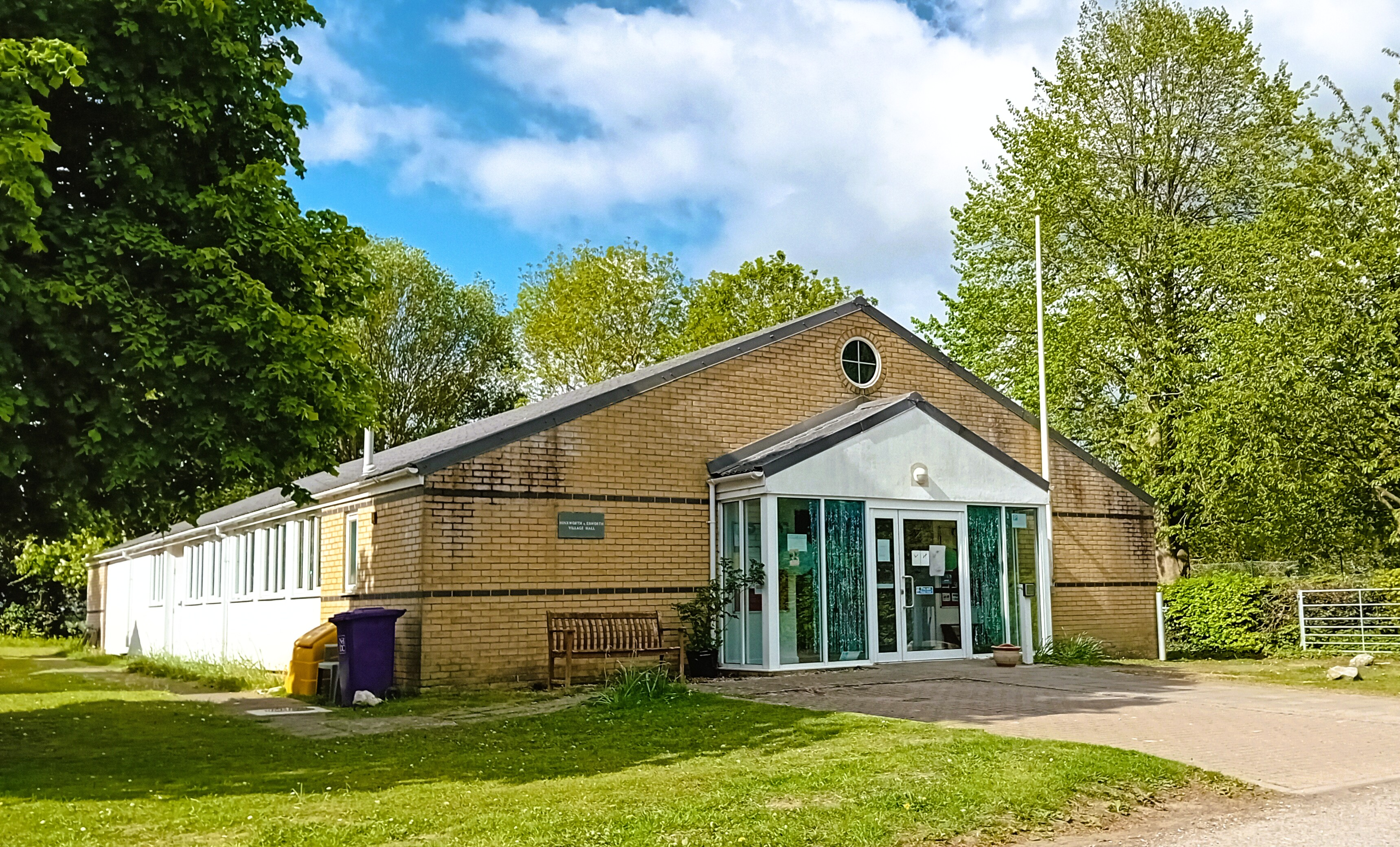
Hinxworth and Edworth Village Hall, Francis Road

Hinxworth has three tiers of local government at parish, district and county level: Hinxworth Parish Council, North Hertfordshire District Council, and Hertfordshire County Council. The parish council meets at the village hall on Francis Road.

Hinxworth is an ancient parish, and it was part of the hundred of Odsey. Hinxworth was included in the Royston Poor Law Union from 1835. The Local Government Act 1894 created parish and district councils. Hinxworth was included in Ashwell Rural District from 28 December 1894. Despite the name, Ashwell Rural District Council was based in the town of Royston. Hinxworth's population at the time was below threshold to be given a parish council, and so it had a parish meeting to take over the secular functions of the parish vestry. A parish council was established by 1939. Ashwell Rural District was abolished in 1935, becoming part of Hitchin Rural District, which in turn was abolished in 1974, becoming part of North Hertfordshire.

== Population ==
At the 2021 census, the population of the parish was 326. The population had been 313 in 2011.

== Notable residents ==
The author Monica Dickens lived in a cottage in the village for four years from 1947 to 1951. Here she wrote her novels Flowers on the Grass (1949) and My Turn to Make the Tea (1951), the latter based on her experiences as a reporter working on the Hertfordshire Express in Hitchin. While in Hinxworth she was the Treasurer of the annual Ashwell Horse Show and President of the Hinxworth Cricket Club, having bought maroon blazers for all the team, the umpire and the club secretary.

The notable 16/17th-century land owner Sir Thomas Golding of Poslingford, Suffolk also owned lands at Hinxworth.

The sculptor John W. Mills lived in Hinxworth from the 1960s until his death in 2023.
