= St Mary's Church, Ashwell =

St Mary's Church, Ashwell may refer to:

- St Mary's Church, Ashwell, Hertfordshire
- St Mary's Church, Ashwell, Rutland
