= St Mary the Virgin, Ivinghoe =

Coordinates: 51.836433°N 0.628783°W

Church of St Mary the Virgin, Ivinghoe
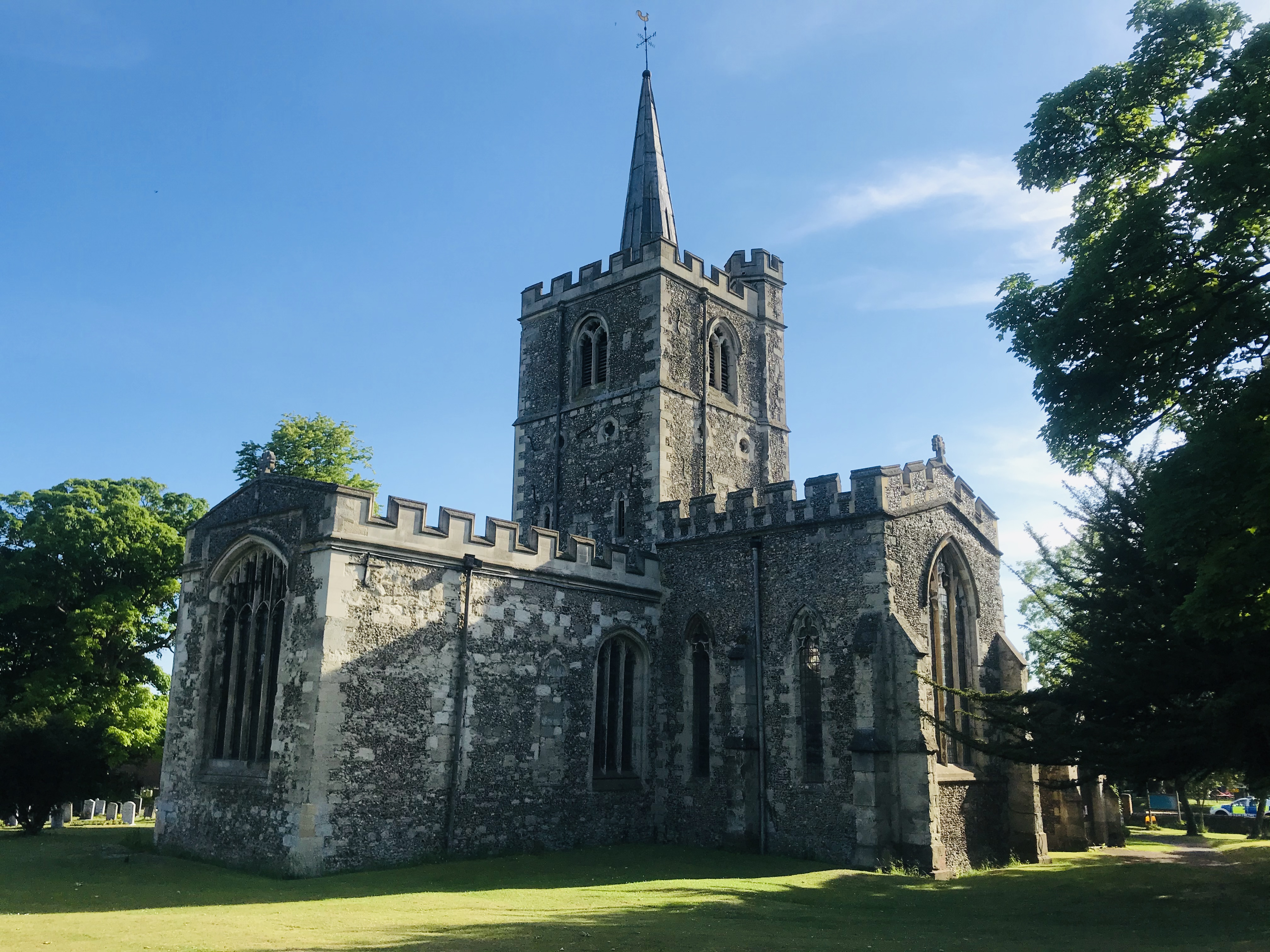
- The Church St Mary the Virgin from the north-east

- Location in Buckinghamshire
- OS grid reference: SP 94553 16177
- Location: Church Road, Ivinghoe, Buckinghamshire, LU7 9EH
- Country: England
- Denomination: Anglican
- Website: ivinghoe-church.org

History
- Founded: c.1222
- Dedication: St Mary the Virgin
- Events: 1220: church founded; 1224: Church burned down; 1400: Tower completed; 1872: Restoration by G.E. Street

Architecture
- Heritage designation: Grade I listed
- Style: Early English, Decorated; some Victorian restoration work
- Years built: c.1220 - 15th century

Specifications
- Width: 90 feet (27 m)
- Materials: Stone, flint facing with Totternhoe stone dressings

Administration
- Province: Canterbury
- Diocese: Oxford
- Archdeaconry: Buckingham
- Deanery: Mursley
- Parish: Ivinghoe with Pitstone

The Church of St Mary the Virgin, Ivinghoe is a 13th-century Church of England parish church in the town of Ivinghoe, Buckinghamshire, England, and is a Grade I listed building. It stands on the main High Street and is surrounded by a churchyard.

The parish is within the Diocese of Oxford.

== History ==
The parish church in Ivinghoe was founded in 1220

On 9 May 1234 the church and the town was burned down by the rebel Richard Siward in an attack on the lands of the church's patron, Peter des Roches the Bishop of Winchester.

== Architecture ==
Nikolaus Pevsner described St. Mary's as "a big and noble church". This Early English church was laid out c.1220 in an original cruciform floorplan with a central tower topped with a lead flèche, a typical example of a Hertfordshire spike. The exterior is faced with flint and has Totternhoe stone dressings, and the walls are topped with decorative crenellations which were added in the 19th century.

It is thought that an older church may have originally stood here in the 12th century. The thickness of the west wall suggests that this older church may have been enlarged to form the present building. The church was rebuilt after 1234, but some original features survive, including rose windows in the transepts. The chancel, transepts, and nave arcades are all early 13th century.

In the 14th century, the tower was rebuilt and the aisles were widened. The 15th century saw considerable expansion of the church: the walls of the nave, chancel and transepts were raised, a clerestory was added above the nave, windows were inserted, the upper part of the tower was rebuilt and the west porch was added. There has been a peal of bells in the tower since at least 1552, when records list 5 bells and a Sanctus bell. The present bells were recast by John Warner & Sons of London in 1875.

Within the church, the aisles are lit by Decorated Period windows. Much medieval stonework is in evidence with moulded doorways and ballflower ornaments and carved foliated bosses. The church is especially noted for its fine 15th-century tie-beam roof, supported by stone corbels with sculpted heads and carved wooden angels with outspread wings. In the nave roof, the braces feature carved figures of the apostles.

Set into the north wall of the chancel is a decorated recessed tomb topped with a recumbent effigy of a priest wearing vestments for celebrating Mass. The head and feet have been defaced and the identity of the effigy is unknown. It has been variously surmised to be the tomb of Peter Chaceporc, rector of the church 1241–1254; Ralph de Ivinghoe (d. 1304); Henry de Blois, Bishop of Winchester and brother of King Stephen; or someone named "Gramfer".

The chancel contains several medieval monumental brasses including one dedicated to Rauf Fallywolle (or Fallowell, d.1349) and his wife Lucie (d.1368), and another dedicated to Richard Blackhed (d. 1517) and his wife Maude. Several of the memorials depict members of the large Duncombe family, showing the deceased accompanied by smaller groups of their children, including the memorials of Thomas Doncombe (d. 1531), and his wife Joan; the memorial to William Duncombe (d. 1576) and his two wives Mary and Alice; and John Douncombe (d. 1594) and Alyce his wife.

In the nave are oak pews dating from the 15th or 16th century, noted for their carved poppyhead finials with grotesque faces. There is a hexagonal, ornately carved Jacobean oak pulpit.

In 1871/2, the church underwent a restoration by the architect George Edmund Street, who introduced some Victorian Gothic Revival elements and built the north and south porches, as well as a medieval-style baptistery.

=== Architectural features ===
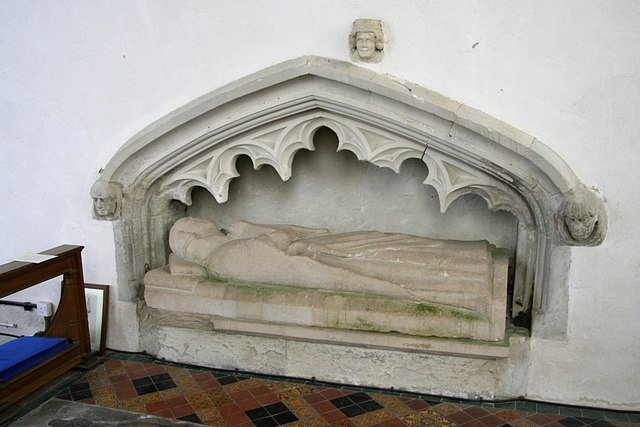
The tomb of the unknown priest

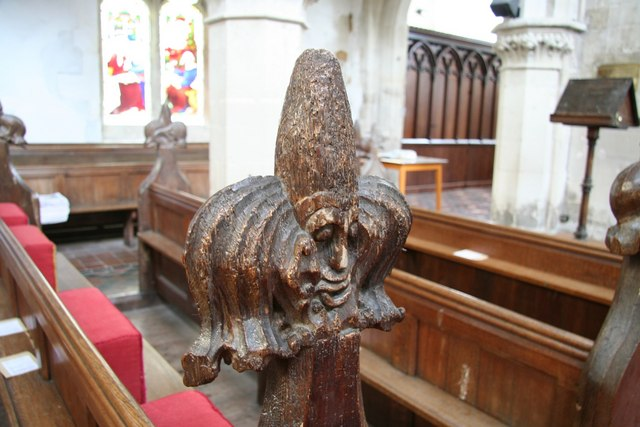
The carved poppyhead pew finials with grotesque faces

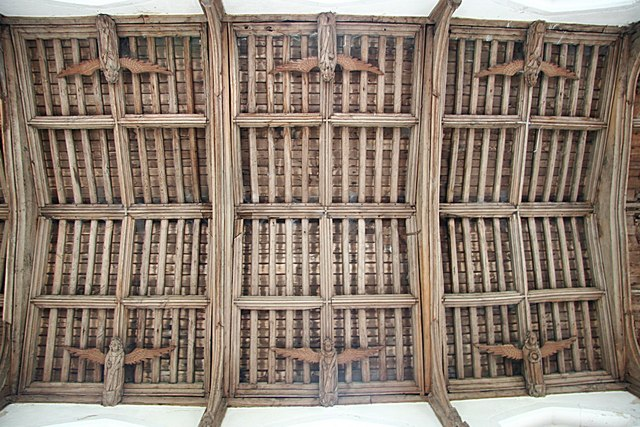
Carved wooden angels decorate the 15th-century tie-beam roof

== Churchyard ==
Many of the headstones in the churchyard are 17th century and mostly indecipherable. There are also five burials of the Commonwealth War Graves Commission. The stage and film actor Athole Stewart (1879–1940) is buried here with his wife Ellen Frances Stewart.
