= Arbury Banks =

Arbury Banks may refer to

- Arbury Banks, Hertfordshire, a Bronze Age hill fort near Ashwell
- Arbury Banks, Northamptonshire, an Iron Age hill fort near Chipping Warden
