= Wilbury Hill Camp =

Hillfort in Hertfordshire, England

Coordinates: 51°58′39″N 0°15′04″W

Path on Wilbury Hill, Letchworth

Wilbury Hill Camp is a late Bronze Age (about 700 BC) hill fort west of Letchworth in Hertfordshire. It and Arbury Banks near Ashwell are two of a line of six similar hill forts along the northern Chilterns. It is a scheduled ancient monument. The site is marked by two circular defences formed by single banks and external ditches. Although these are no longer conspicuous on the ground, distinct cropmarks generated by the buried features have been recorded by aerial photography since the 1950s.

During the Middle Iron Age (about 400 BC) more substantial banks were built.

Many Roman coins were collected by the local antiquarian William Ransome when the extreme northern corner of the enclosure was quarried for railway ballast in the mid-19th century. A selection of these is displayed at Letchworth Museum.

Ordnance Survey Grid Reference: TL20213245.
