= Hertfordshire spike =

Type of short spire or flèche

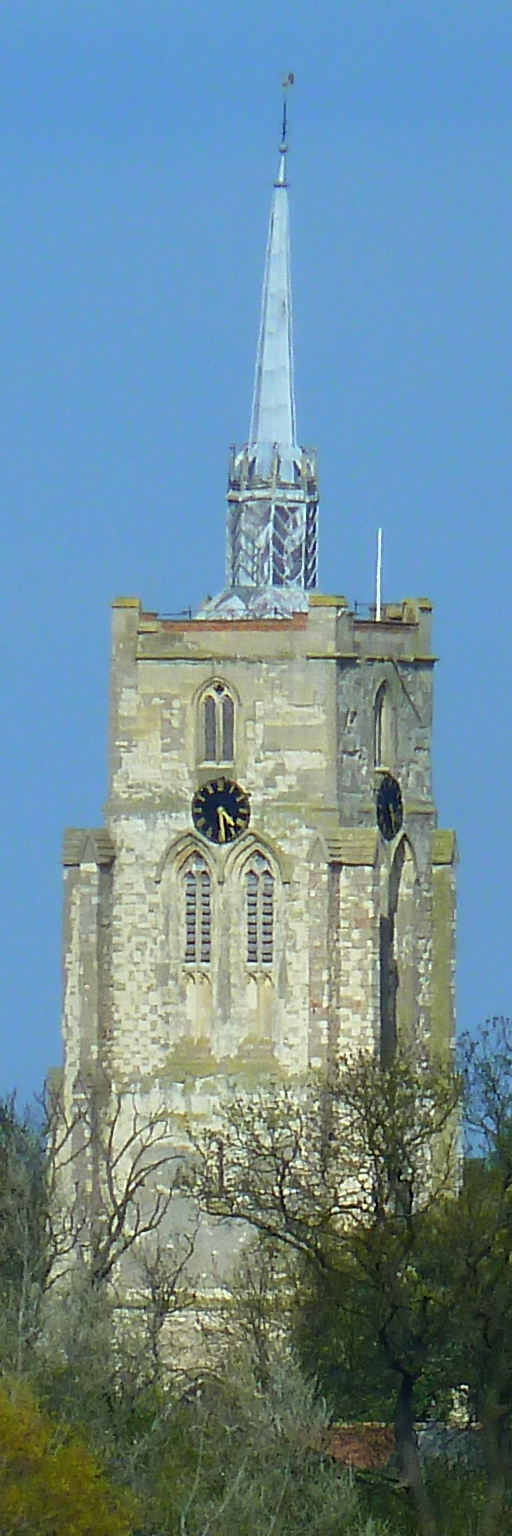
The tower and spire of St Mary's parish church, Ashwell

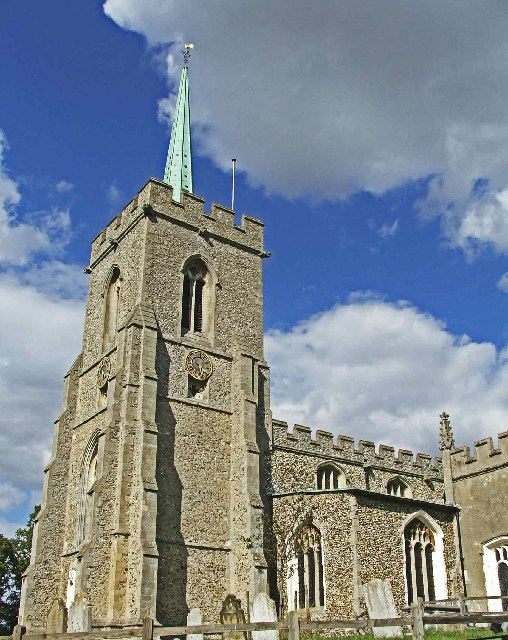
A Hertfordshire Spike at Braughing, Hertfordshire

A Hertfordshire spike is a type of short spire or flèche found on church-towers surrounded by a parapet. It is defined in the Buildings of England as a "flèche or short spire rising from a church-tower, its base concealed by a parapet". As the name suggests, it is common in Hertfordshire, but the same type of structure can be found in other English counties. The Church of St Mary the Virgin, Wendens Ambo, is a good example in Essex, and in Buckinghamshire is St Mary the Virgin, Ivinghoe.

Hertfordshire lacks good building stone, and its spires contrast with, for example, those of Northamptonshire which has a wealth of stone.

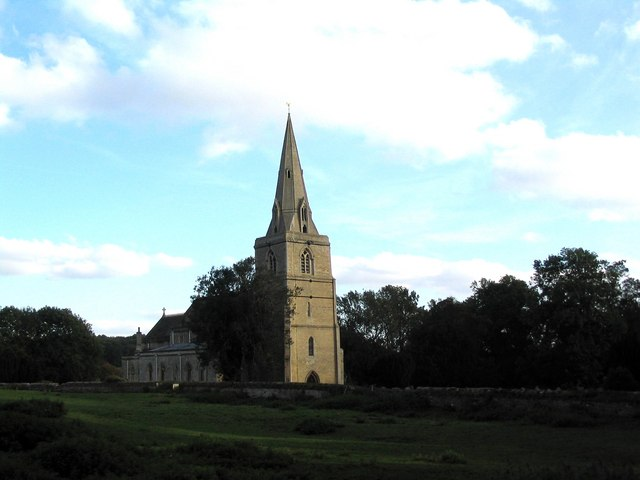
An example of a broach spire in Northamptonshire

Even so, some Hertfordshire spikes are more elaborate than others. That of the Church of St Mary the Virgin, Ashwell, is part of an unusually tall and ornate tower.
