= Ashwell War Memorial =

War memorial in Ashwell, Hertfordshire, England

Coordinates: 52°02′35″N 0°08′45″W

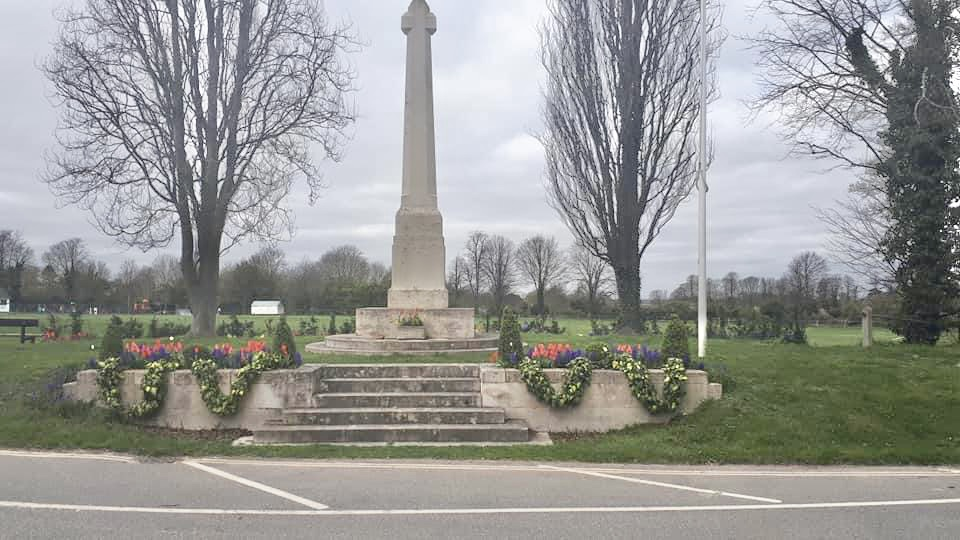

Ashwell War Memorial is a war memorial cross in the village of Ashwell in North Hertfordshire, England. The memorial was designed by Sir Edwin Lutyens and unveiled in 1921, one of 15 war crosses designed by Lutyens to similar designs erected between 1920 and 1925. It is a Grade II listed building.

A parish war memorial committee was formed in Ashwell in 1919, chaired by a local brewer Wolverley Attwood Fordham. The committee requested design proposals from the architects Sir Reginald Blomfield, and Sir Edwin Lutyens, and from a local building firm, Tappers, before deciding to commission a cross designed by Lutyens. The memorial was constructed built by Holland, Hannen & Cubitts, who also built Lutyens' Cenotaph in Whitehall, at a cost of £557, including a fee of nearly £43 for Lutyens.

The memorial is located on the east side of Ashwell village, to the west side of the junction of Lucas Lane and Station Road. It comprises a tapering Portland stone war cross, standing on a square plinth and podium, on a circular stone base of only two steps rather than the usual three, surrounded by grass. The memorial is raised above the road junction by a stone retaining wall with a flight of six steps. The cross bears several inscriptions: to the front "IN HONOUR OF THE MEN OF / ASHWELL WHO FOUGHT IN THE / GREAT WAR AND IN LOVING / MEMORY OF THOSE WHO FELL / OUR GLORIOUS DEAD" then some names then the inscription "THEIR NAME LIVETH FOR EVERMORE". The south side bears the date "1914" and more names, and the north side bears the date "1919" and yet more names. Further names were inscribed on the podium later to record the war dead from the Second World War. It bears 42 names in all.

The memorial was unveiled on 4 December 1921 by the Lord Lieutenant of Hertfordshire Thomas Brand, 3rd Viscount Hampden. It became a Grade II listed building in November 1984.
