= St Mary's Church, Ashwell, Hertfordshire =

Church in Hertfordshire, England

Coordinates: 52°02′31″N 0°09′14″W

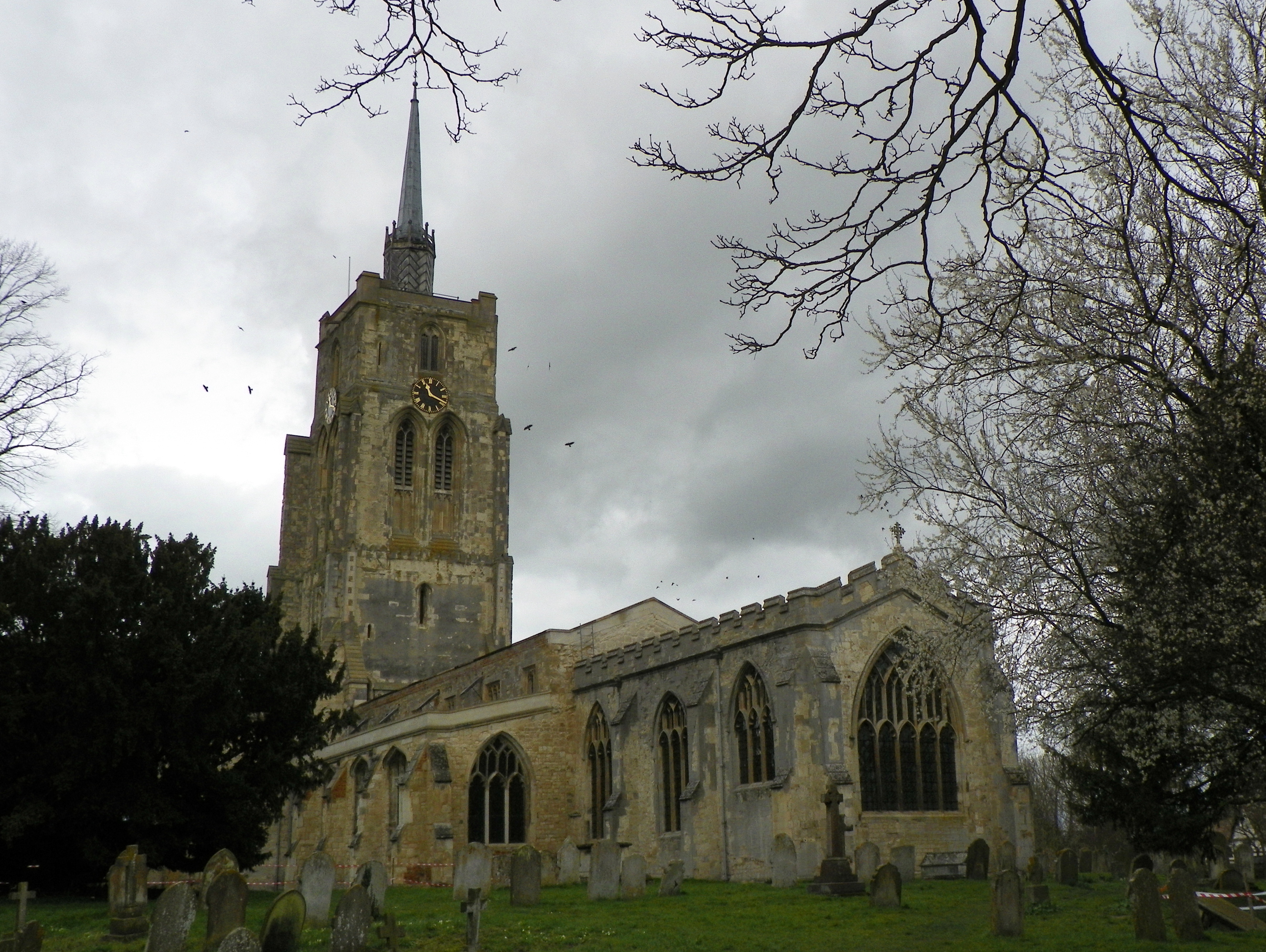
Church of St Mary the Virgin in Ashwell

The Church of St Mary the Virgin in Ashwell, in the English county of Hertfordshire, is the Anglican parish church for the village. It comes under the Diocese of St Albans and is one of the largest village churches in the county. The Church is part of a wider benefice, together with St Nicholas', Hinxworth and St Vincent's, Newnham, and the Rector of all three parishes is Reverend Christine Campbell, who was licensed to the parishes in September 2021. As a village church in the heart of the community, St Mary’s exists "to welcome everyone and share the love and life of Christ with all, through our worship, teaching and life together, now and into the future".

The church dates almost entirely from the 14th century and is renowned for its ornate tower which stands at 176 feet (54 m) and which is crowned by an octagonal lantern with a leaded flèche or spire. The church also contains some medieval graffiti carved on its walls which highlights the plight of survivors of the bubonic plague pandemic known as the Black Death. The church has been Grade I listed since 1968.

Today St Mary's is a popular venue for music concerts and festivals, including the Ashwell Music Festival.

== History and design ==
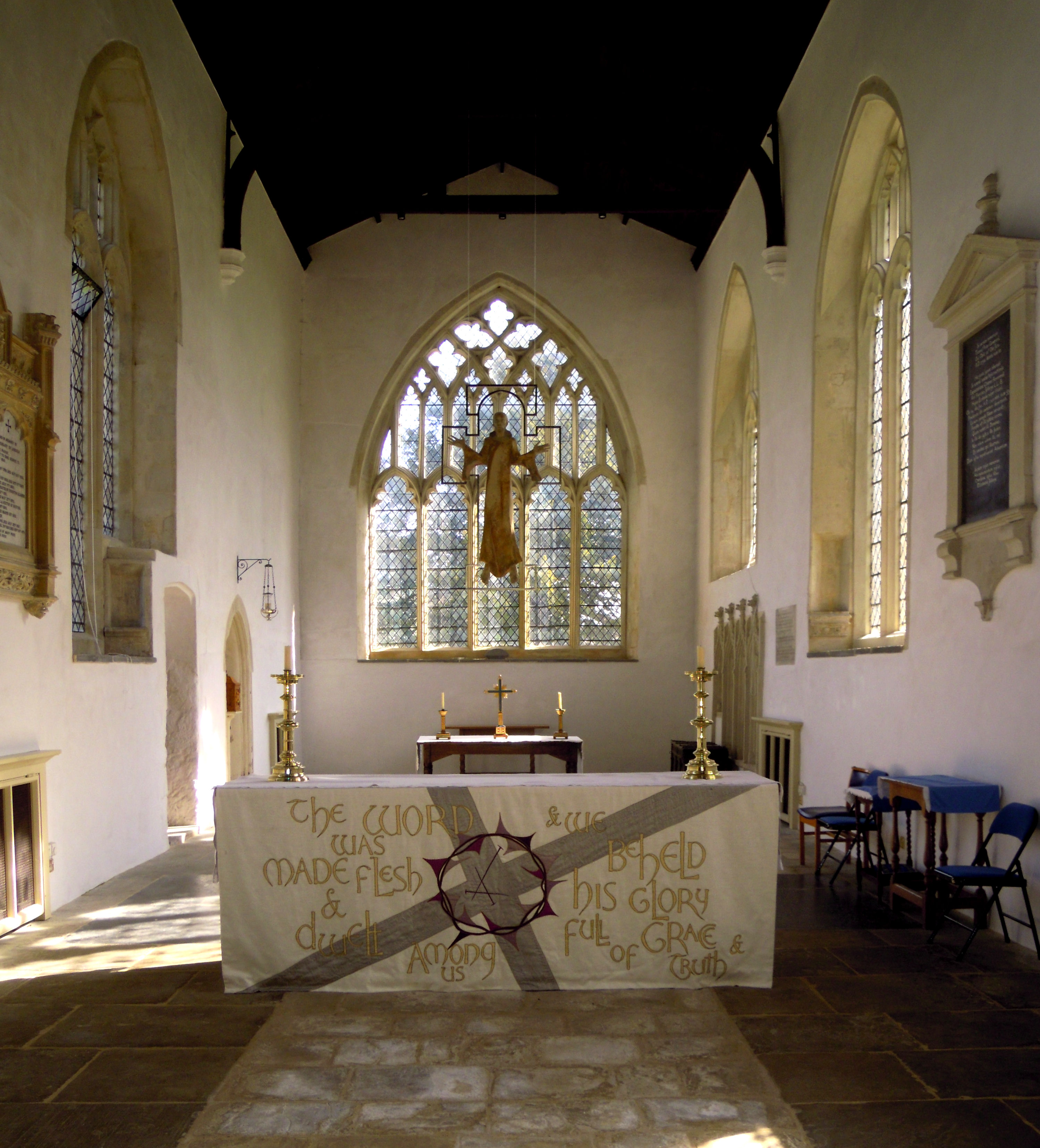
The chancel

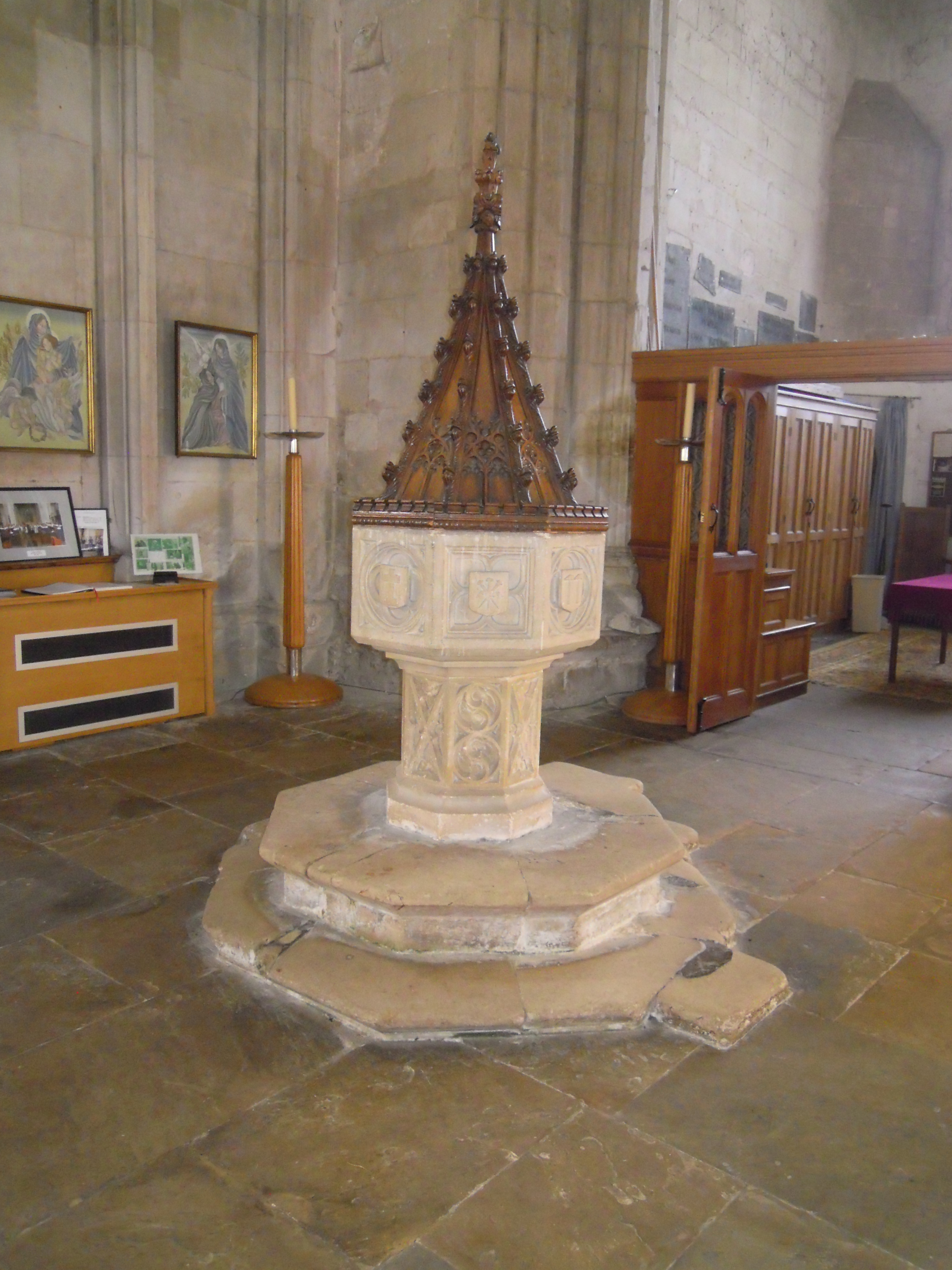
The Victorian baptismal font

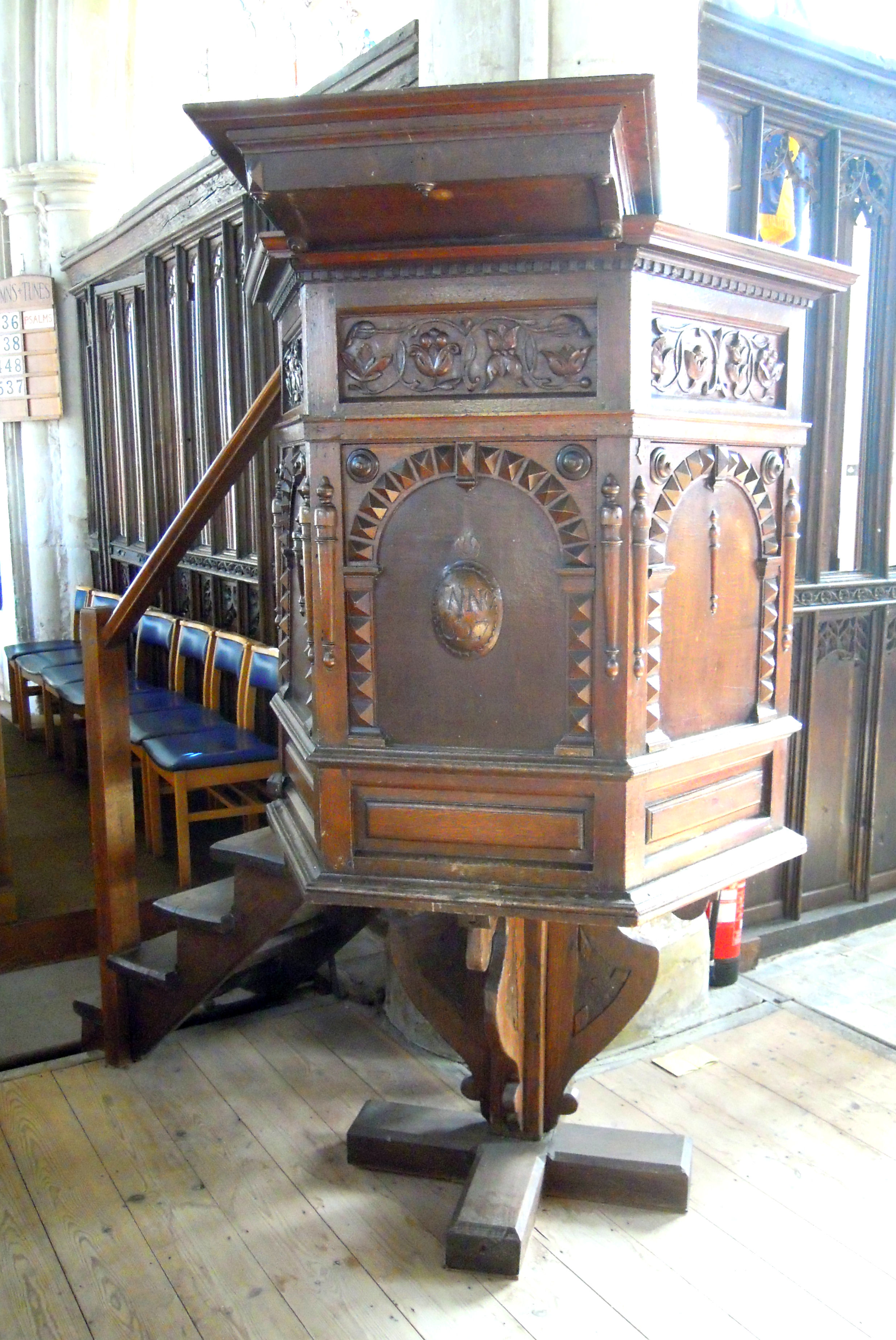
The pulpit was installed in 1627

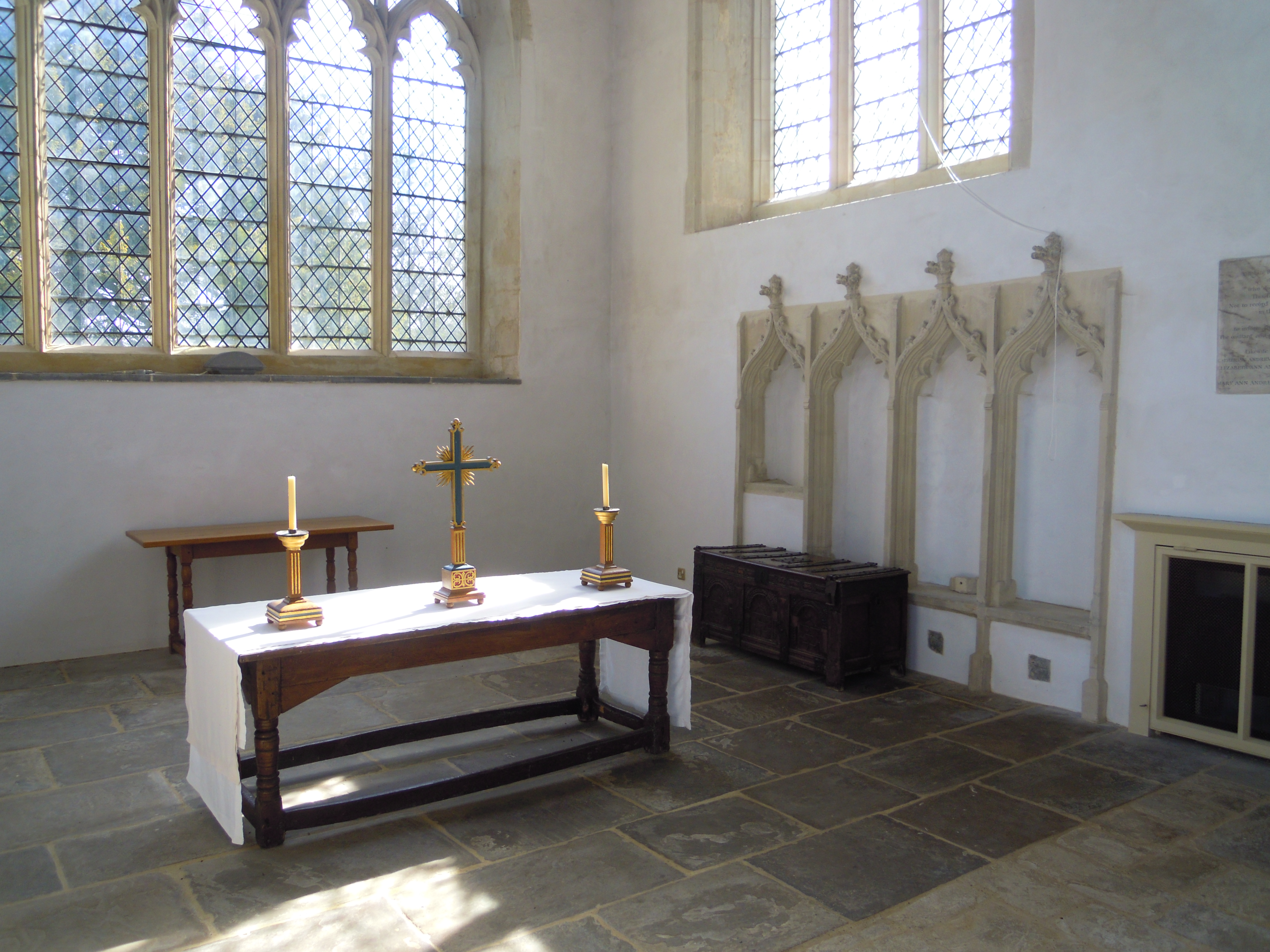
The Sanctuary and sedilia

It is not known whether an earlier church occupied the site, but if one did its materials would presumably have been incorporated into the present church, which was completed in 1381 using clunch, flint rubble and a small quantity of red bricks. St Mary's Church has a large west tower built in four stages, the top half of the tower having been added some time after 1415 while the lead-covered wooden flèche was added between 1415 and 1562. At 176 feet (54 m) including the flèche, the tower is the tallest in Hertfordshire.

The North porch and the aisle windows were added in the 15th century; the North porch is single storey and retains its original door arch and windows, while the two-storey 14th-century South porch has many of its original features with a gabled front that was restored in the 19th century. The North aisle is dedicated to St James. The nave is of five bays, and the chancel retains its mid-14th-century sedilia. The original rood screen dividing the chancel from the nave was probably destroyed during the English Reformation. Today in its place is a modern cross above the altar of The Risen Christ by John Mills, President of the Royal Society of British Sculptors and who lives nearby in Hinxworth Place.

The mediaeval stained glass in the East window which showed depictions from the life of Thomas Becket was removed in 1538 by order of Henry VIII. Three small fragments of the mediaeval glass can still be found in the windows of the North Aisle, while other small pieces of it were discovered in the churchyard and have been set in the modern clear glass.

The hexagonal wooden pulpit is dated 1627 while the church has a 15th-century traceried wooden screen to the Lady Chapel in the East bay of the South aisle. The baptismal font is a 19th-century replica but stands on an early octagonal base. There are 15th-century benches near the chancel.

On a visit to Ashwell in 1956 the future Poet Laureate John Betjeman wrote of St Mary's:

"So I went to Ashwell which is near nowhere, unless it be Baldock, and on the road to nothing, thank God. We first saw its gigantic dark grey fourteenth-century church tower, crowned with a tapering lead flèche, rising from huge elms on chalky foothills looking over open corn land to the levels of Hunts and Cambs. ... And the church inside, white and spacious and East Anglian, with arcades like a Cathedral, clear glass everywhere, uneven floors and splendid chancel, was worthy of the best of English villages."

== Ashwell graffiti ==
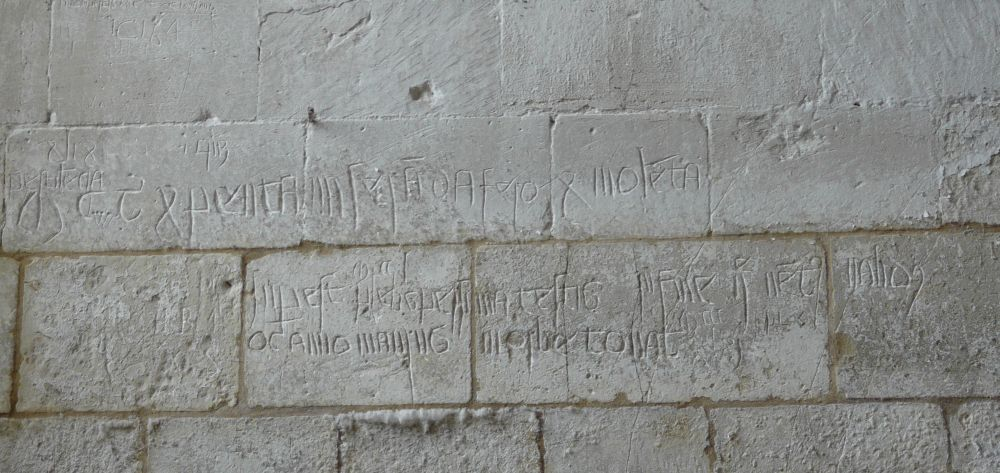
Graffiti of 1360 and 1361 in St Mary's church

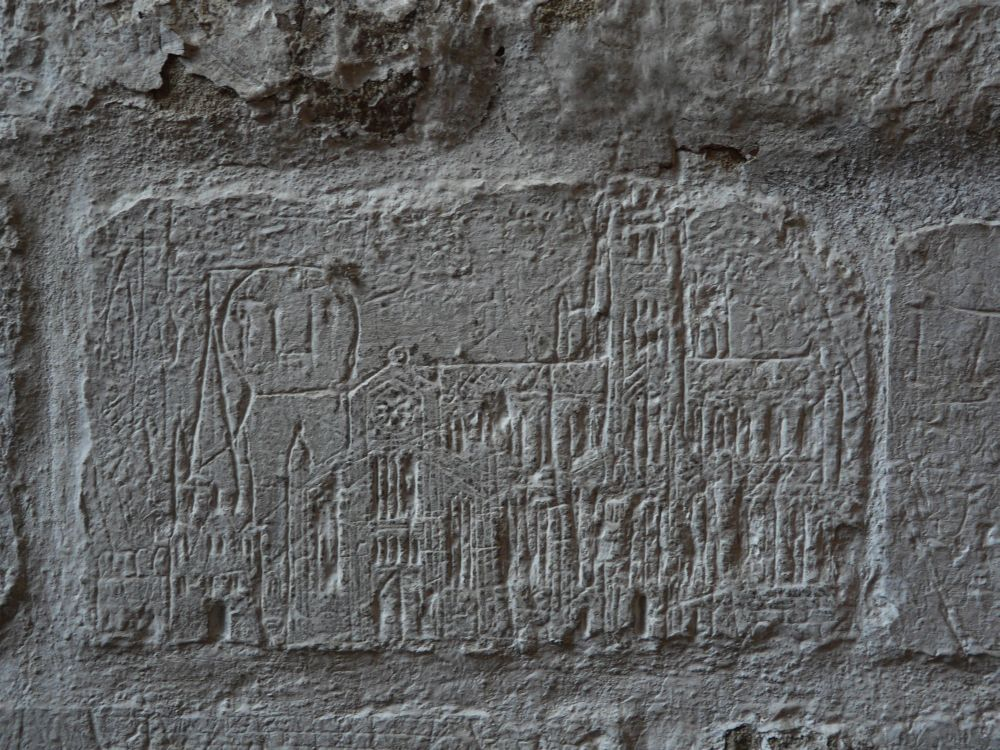
Graffito of Old St Paul's Cathedral in St Mary's

On the North wall of the West tower can be found some remarkable 14th-century graffiti which includes an inscription recording survival of citizens of Ashwell during the Great Plague known as the Black Death and an early inscribed drawing of the Old St Paul's Cathedral in London. There is no clue as to who wrote the graffiti or to its exact date. On the wall of the church tower graffiti was inscribed, which reads:

"MCT Expente miseranda ferox, violenta Superest plebs pessima testis, MCCCL"

A translation of the above is:

"1350 Miserable, wild, distracted 1350
The dregs of the mob alone survive to witness"

This refers to the bubonic plague epidemic during the reign of Edward III when it is known Ashwell suffered greatly at this time.

A later graffito dated 1361 reads:

"In finque ventus validus oc anne maurus orbe tonat MCCCLXI"

Which translates as:

"And in the end a tempest full and mighty
This year 1361 thunders mightily in the world"

This last line probably refers to the famous storm of St Maur's Day on 15 January 1361 which may have cleared the air of any remaining traces of the Black Death.

Below and on the same wall is inscribed a sketch thought to be of Old St Paul's Cathedral which burnt down in the Great Fire of London in 1666. This is the most important of the graffiti in St Mary's, not only because the depiction is of national importance but also because the mediaeval depiction of buildings in such detail is rare, even in manuscripts. The date the depiction was made was sometime in the 14th or 15th century. Architecturally, it shows a building in the Perpendicular style of about 1350 to 1500. It cannot be earlier than the masonry of St Mary's church which dates from about 1340, and if it actually does depict St Paul's it cannot be later that 1561, when the spire of St Paul's fell down.

Most of the rest of the graffiti in the church is scratched on the pillars in the nave. On the pillar nearest the Lady Chapel is one yet to be interpreted which is believed to refer to the consecration of the church. On the pillar near the south door there is a comment from a frustrated mediaeval architect: "Cornua non sunt arto compugente-sputo" – meaning "The corners are not pointed correctly – I spit". On another pillar is a brief inscription showing the bitterness of some unhappy suitor in love: "Barbara filia barbara est" – "Barbara is the daughter of a barbarian".

== Bells and embroideries ==
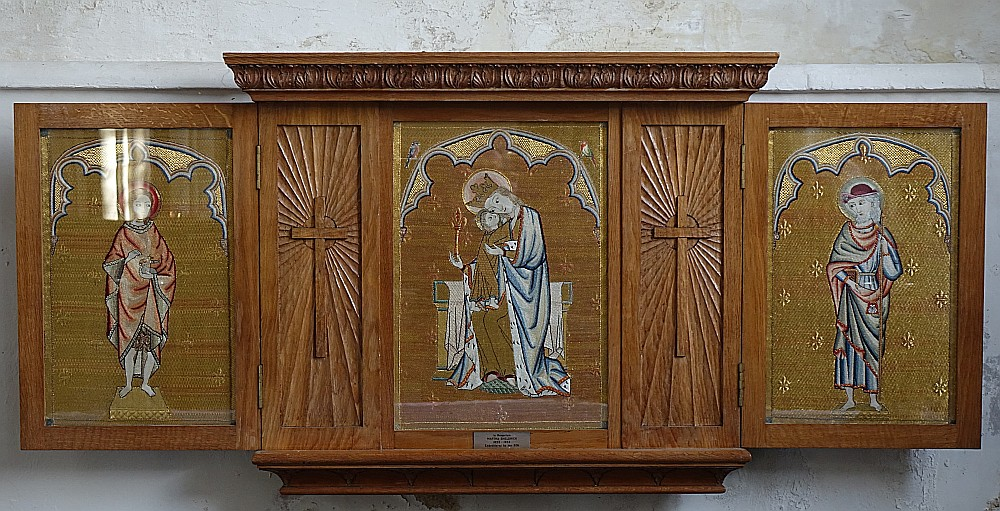
Reredos embroidered by Percy Sheldrick in the Lady Chapel

The church has six bells hanging in a 15th-century frame in the tower. The second bell, cast in 1694 by Charles Newman, is the oldest. The fifth was cast by Robert Taylor of St Neots in 1808. The remaining bells were cast by John Brian of Hartford between 1787 and 1817. With a tenor of 18 and three quarter hundredweight, the bells make up the heaviest ring of six bells in Hertfordshire.

The embroideries displayed around the church include the reredos behind the altar in the Lady Chapel showing The Virgin and Child flanked by St James and St John the Baptist are by Percy Sheldrick (1890–1979) of Ashwell who worked as a master weaver and embroiderer at William Morris' Morris & Co. workshops at Merton Abbey Mills during the 1920s. His greatest work was 'The Passing of Venus' from a design by Pre-Raphaelite Brotherhood artist Edward Burne-Jones and which includes 18 life-size figures; it is now in Lansing Community College in Michigan. He left Merton Abbey Mills in 1939 and returned to Ashwell to work for an antique dealer. There, he acted as Verger at St Mary's. Sheldrick continued to embroider in his spare time and his work can be found in collections and institutions all round the world.
