= Church of St Nicholas, Hinxworth =

Church in Hertfordshire, England

Coordinates: 52.0477°N 0.1970°W

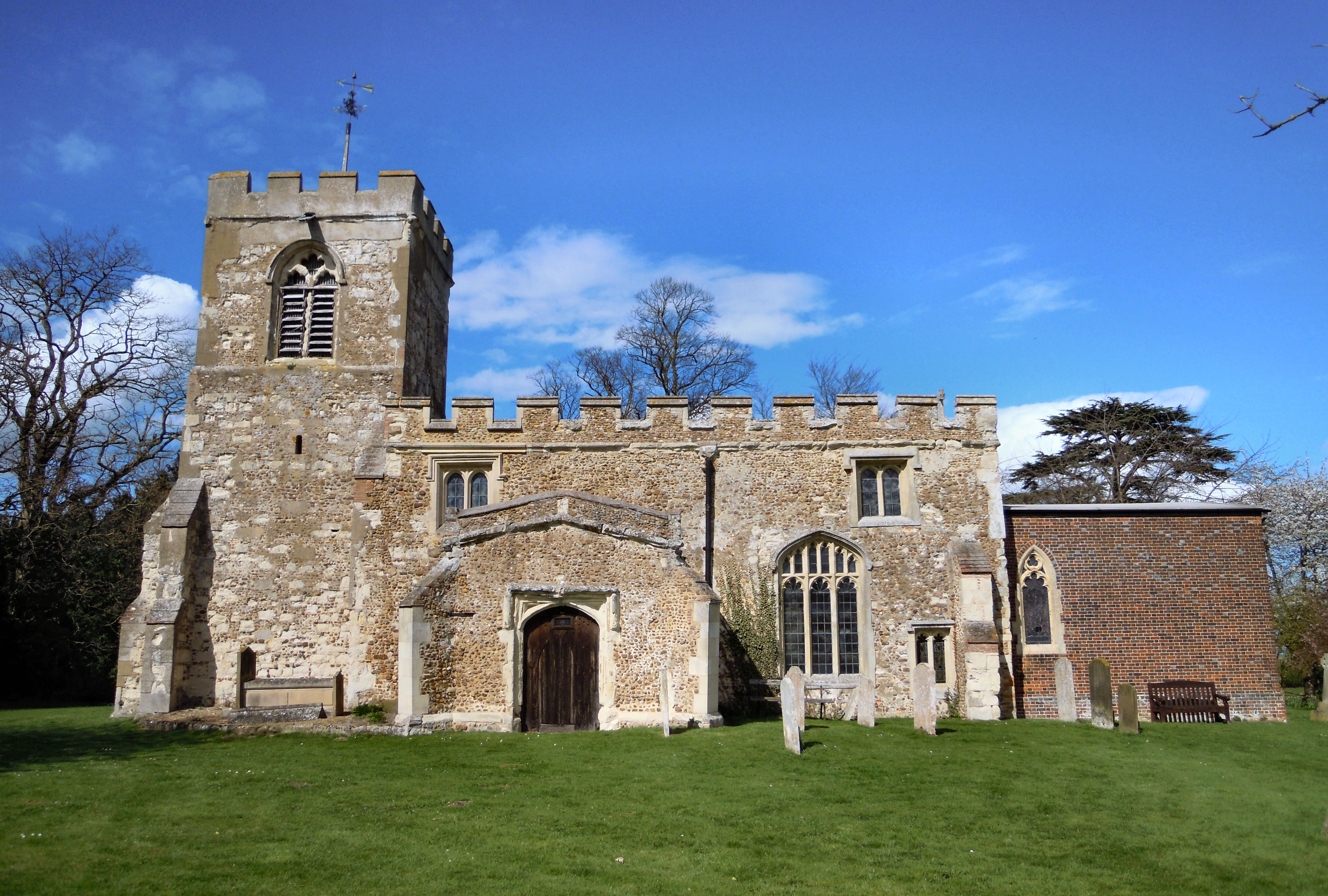
The Church of St Nicholas in Hinxworth

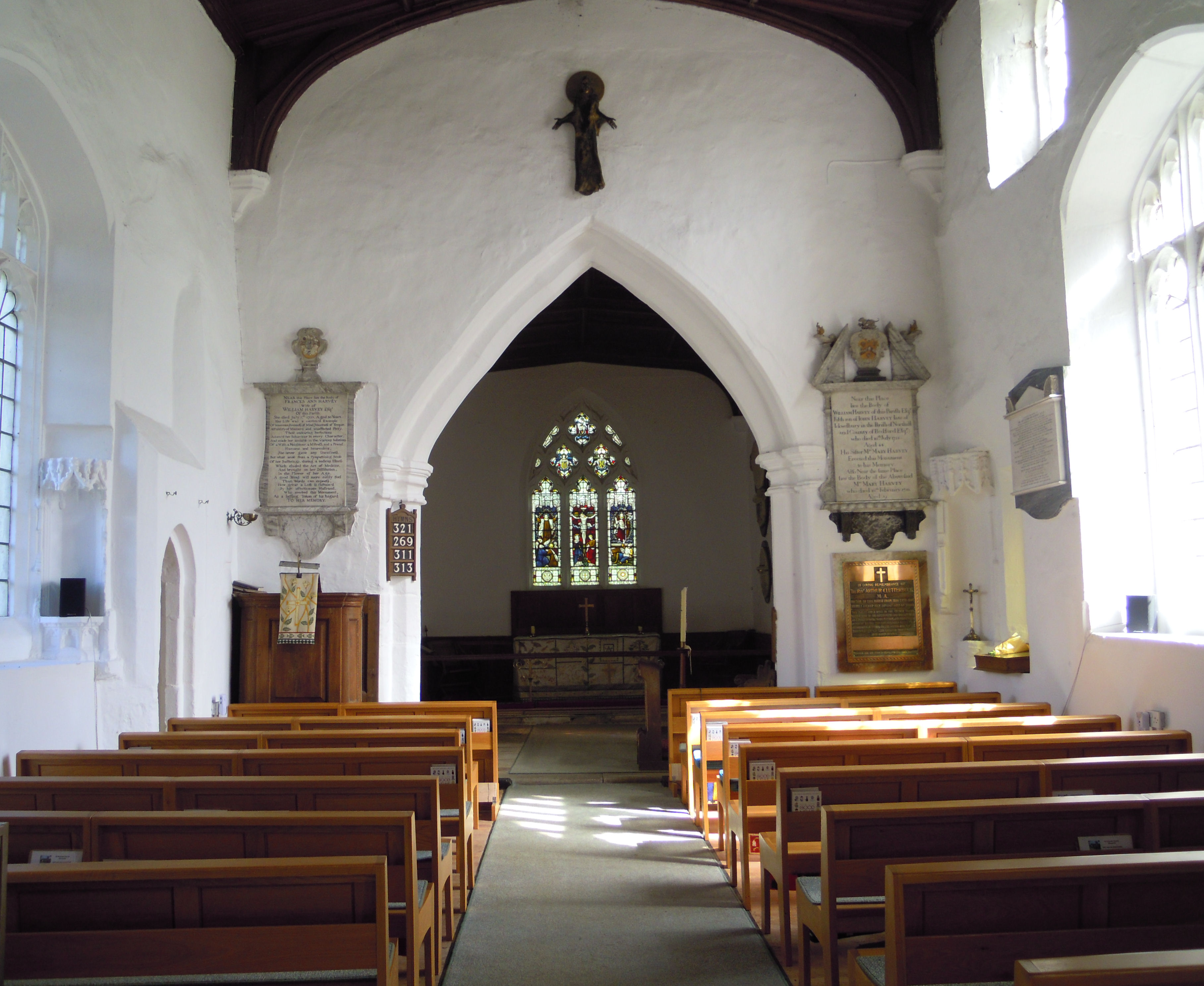
Looking East towards the chancel showing the canopied niches

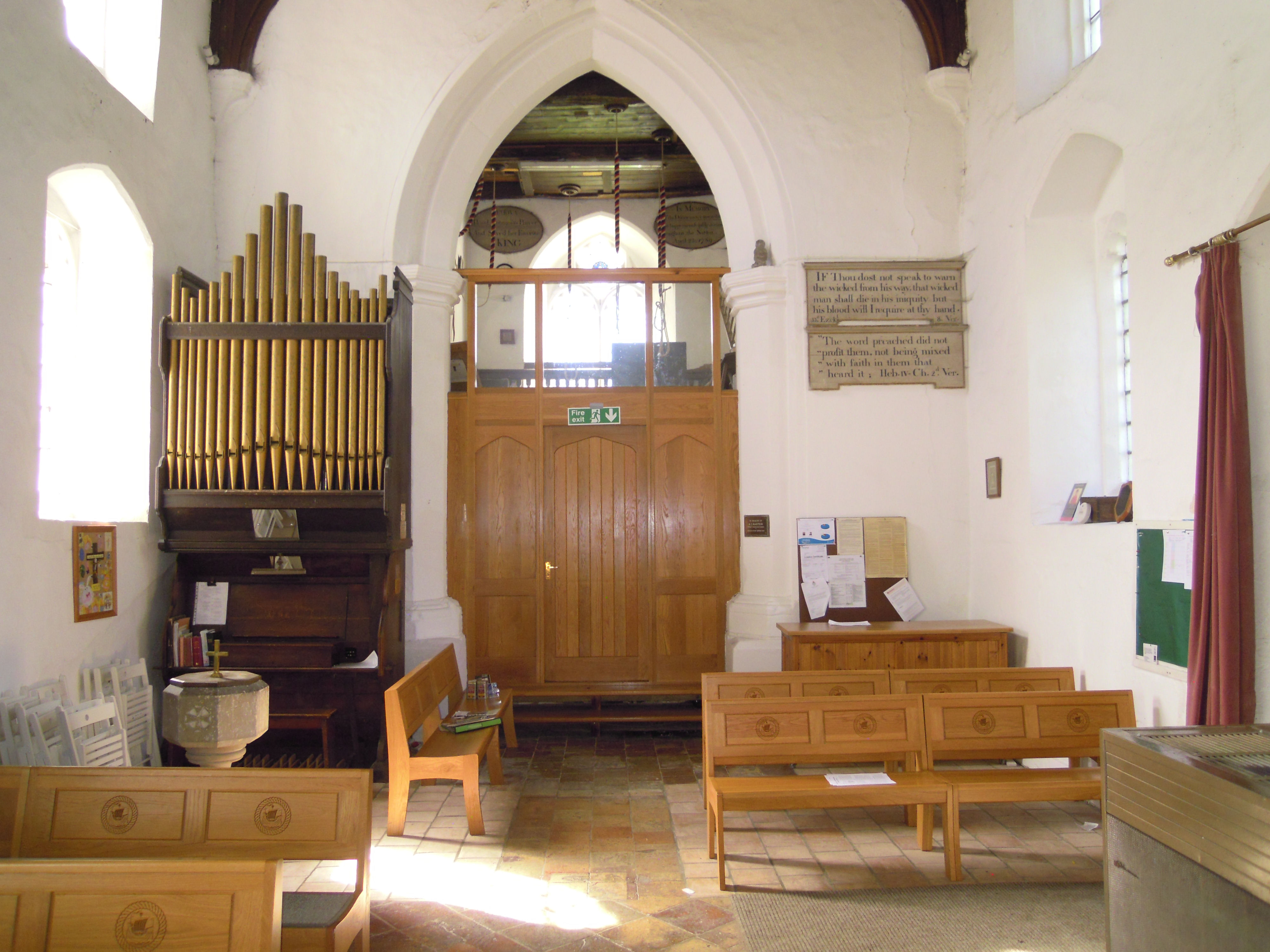
Looking West in the church of St Nicholas

The Church of St Nicholas is a Church of England parish church in the village of Hinxworth in Hertfordshire and is a Grade II* listed building dating mostly to the 14th century. The church comes under the Diocese of St Albans.

The church is dedicated to St Nicholas and almost certainly stands on the site of an earlier church; however, there is no mention of a priest at Hinxworth in the Domesday Book. The West tower and battlemented nave are 14th century with 15th-century alterations and are built of flint rubble with clunch dressings. The chancel, which was rebuilt c. 1830, is of early 19th-century red brick chequered with stone dressings. The tower is in two stages with angle buttresses and battlements. The gabled South porch dates to the 15th century. The chancel measures 20 ft. by 16 ft., the nave 42 ft. 6 in. by 20 ft., the west tower 10 ft. 6 in. square, and the south porch 12 ft. by 10 ft.

St Nicholas' has an aisleless nave with a late 19th-century panelled roof supported on four 15th-century carved wooden corbels. In the splay of the North nave window and in the south-east corner of the nave are two unusual canopied niches. Beside the north window is a 14th-century spiral staircase, now blocked at the top, which originally led up to the now lost rood screen. The west arch is of about 1350 and has semi-octagonal shafts. The original chancel arch was demolished in about 1440 and a mis-shaped replacement was built about 2 ft further east. The clerestory was raised at the end of the 15th century, and a new low-pitched roof was installed above it. The chancel has a panelled ceiling with simple bosses, while the stained-glass windows are mid-19th century.

Two monumental brasses can be found in the chancel, with that high on the north wall being mid-15th century and believed to be the figures of Simon Ward, 1453, and his wife, 1481; that on the floor of a man, woman and six children is said to be of John Lambard, Alderman of London (died 1487), the eldest daughter was supposedly Elizabeth (better known as Jane Shore, mistress of Edward IV of England). The pulpit is mid-18th century with fielded panels, near which is a 16th- or early 17th-century Rector's chair. The small octagonal baptismal font in the west is mid-19th century. There are six bells with the treble by Mears & Stainbank (1908); the second by John Briant of Hertford (1820); the third and fourth by Miles Graye (1651); and the fifth and tenor by John Briant (1825 and 1820). These bells and the tower were restored between 1981 and 1986 with money given in response to a BBC Radio Appeal by author Monica Dickens, who had lived in the village before her marriage, and with funds raised by the Friends of the Church. The church has been Grade II* listed since May 1968.

== Gallery ==
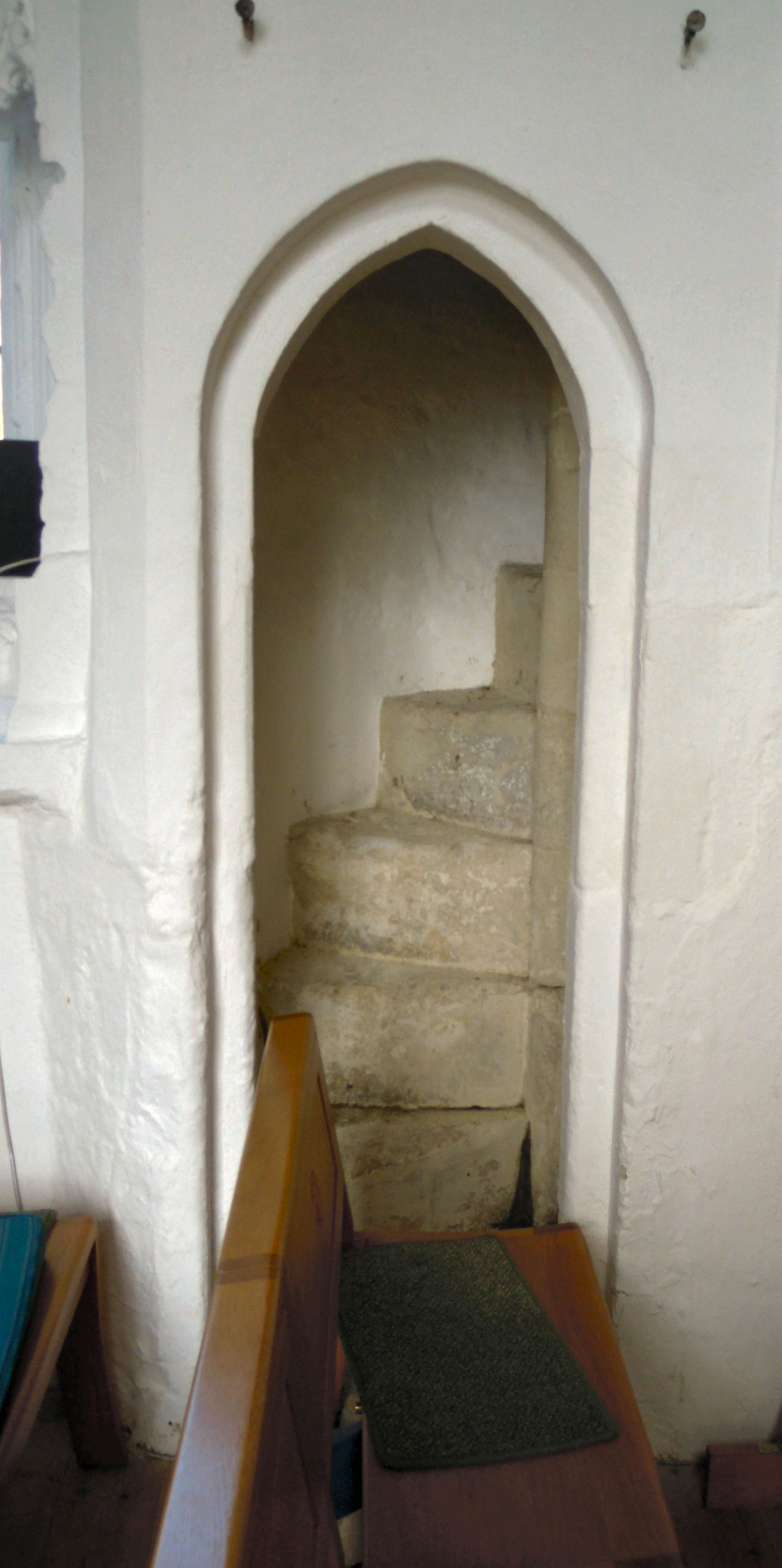
The stairs leading to the rood screen

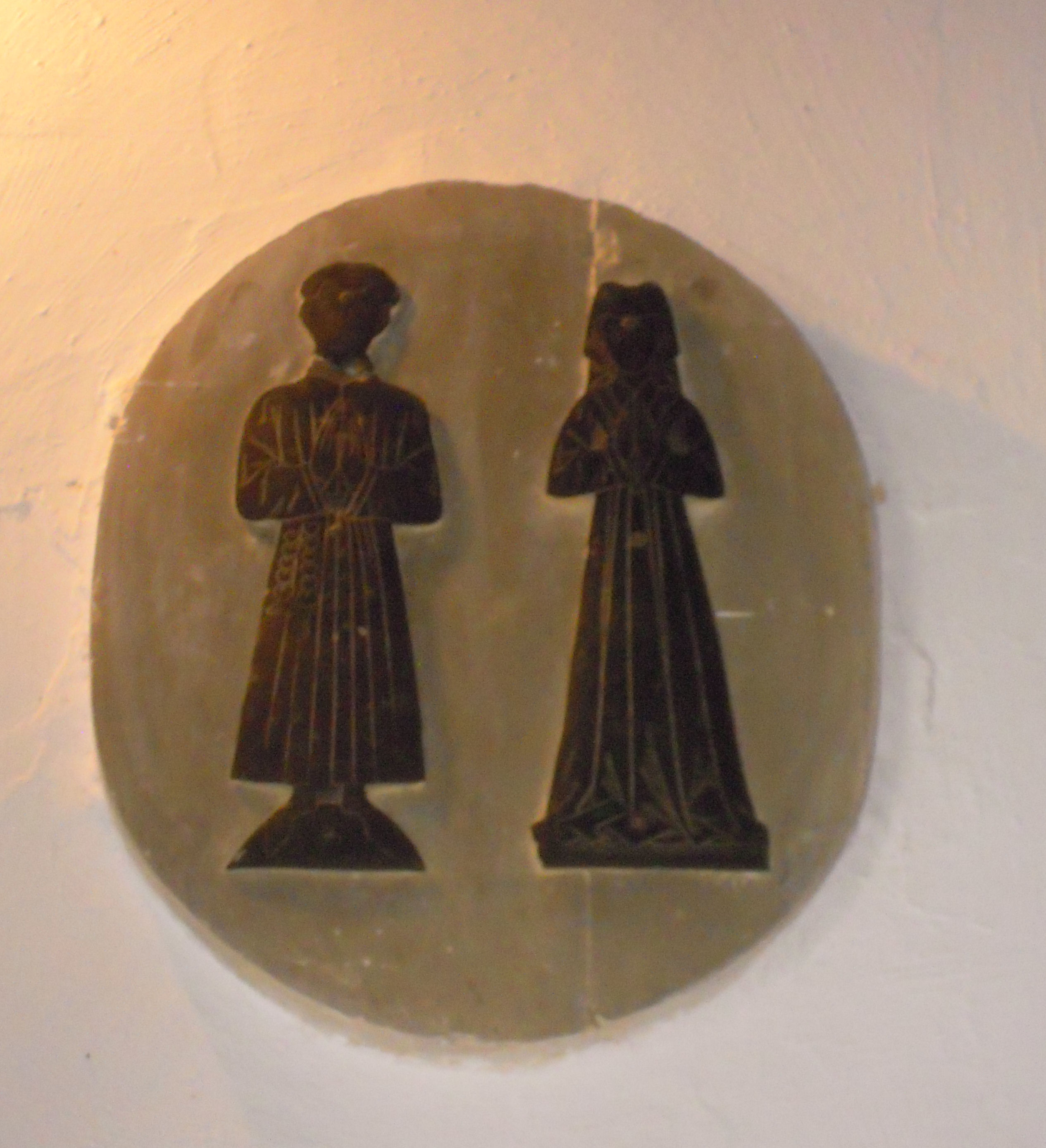
Monumental brass to Simon Ward and his wife (15th century)

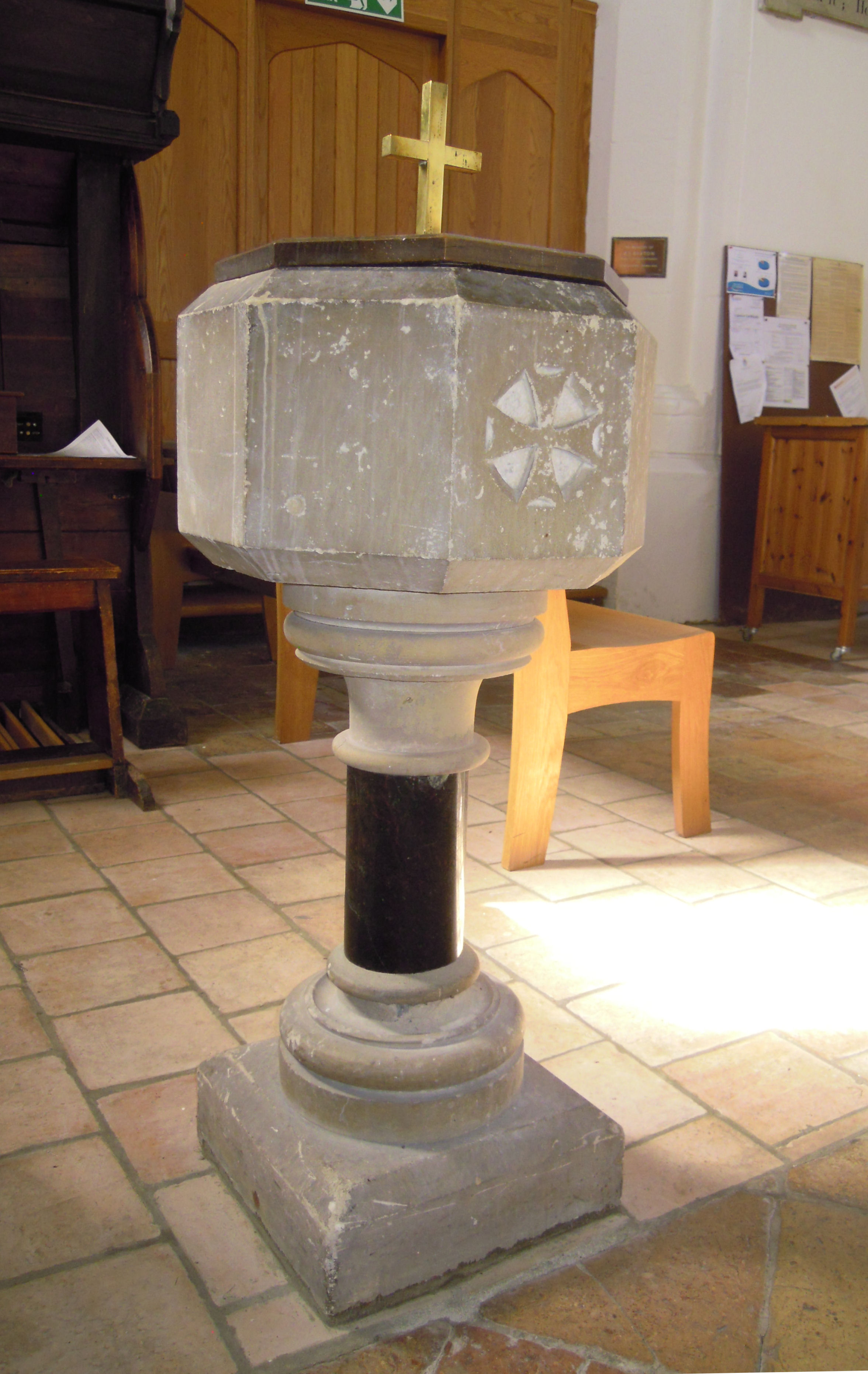
The 19th century baptismal font
