= Ashwell, Hertfordshire =

Village in Hertfordshire, England

Coordinates: 52.04217°N 0.15699°W

Ashwell
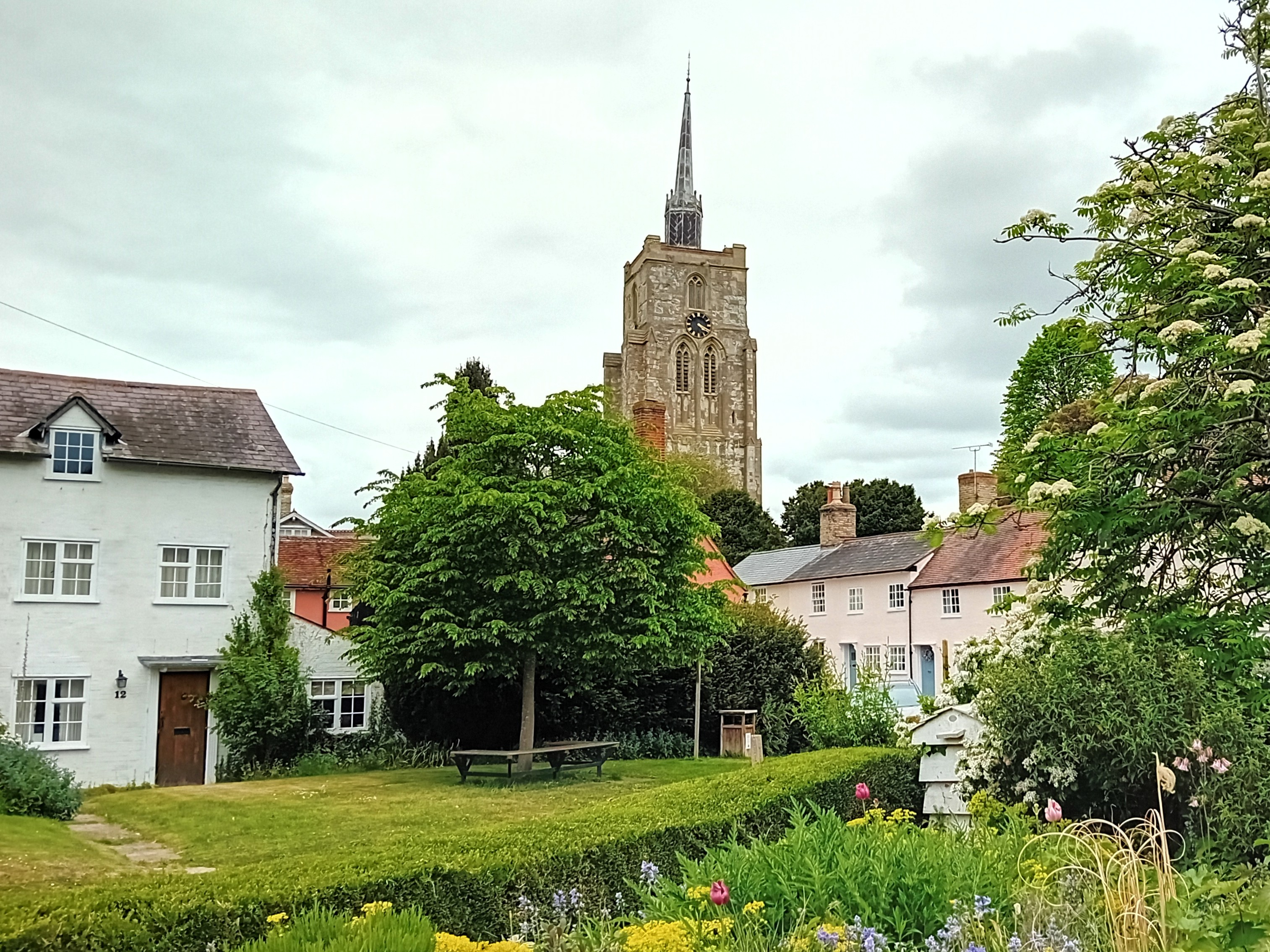
- Tower of St Mary's Church from Swan Street

- Location within Hertfordshire
- Population: 1,980 (Parish, 2021)
- OS grid reference: TL265398
- District: North Hertfordshire
- Shire county: Hertfordshire
- Region: East
- Country: England
- Sovereign state: United Kingdom
- Post town: BALDOCK
- Postcode district: SG7
- Dialling code: 01462
- Police: Hertfordshire
- Fire: Hertfordshire
- Ambulance: East of England
- UK Parliament: North East Hertfordshire

Ashwell is a village and civil parish in the North Hertfordshire district of Hertfordshire, England. It lies 4 miles (6 km) north-east of Baldock.

== History ==
To the southwest of the village is Arbury Banks, the remains of an Iron Age hill fort which have been largely removed by agricultural activity.

In 2002, local metal detectorists found a silver Roman figurine of a goddess, Dea Senuna. A subsequent archaeological dig over four summers revealed 26 more gold and silver objects situated in a major open-air ritual site.

The Buckinghamshire family of Nernewt (Nernuyt) held land in the village in the 14th century, which was originally part of the Abbot of Westminster's manor. This land became the manor of Westbury Nernewtes.

The village has a wealth of architecture spanning several centuries. There was also a great fire of Ashwell on Saturday 2 February 1850, without fatalities.

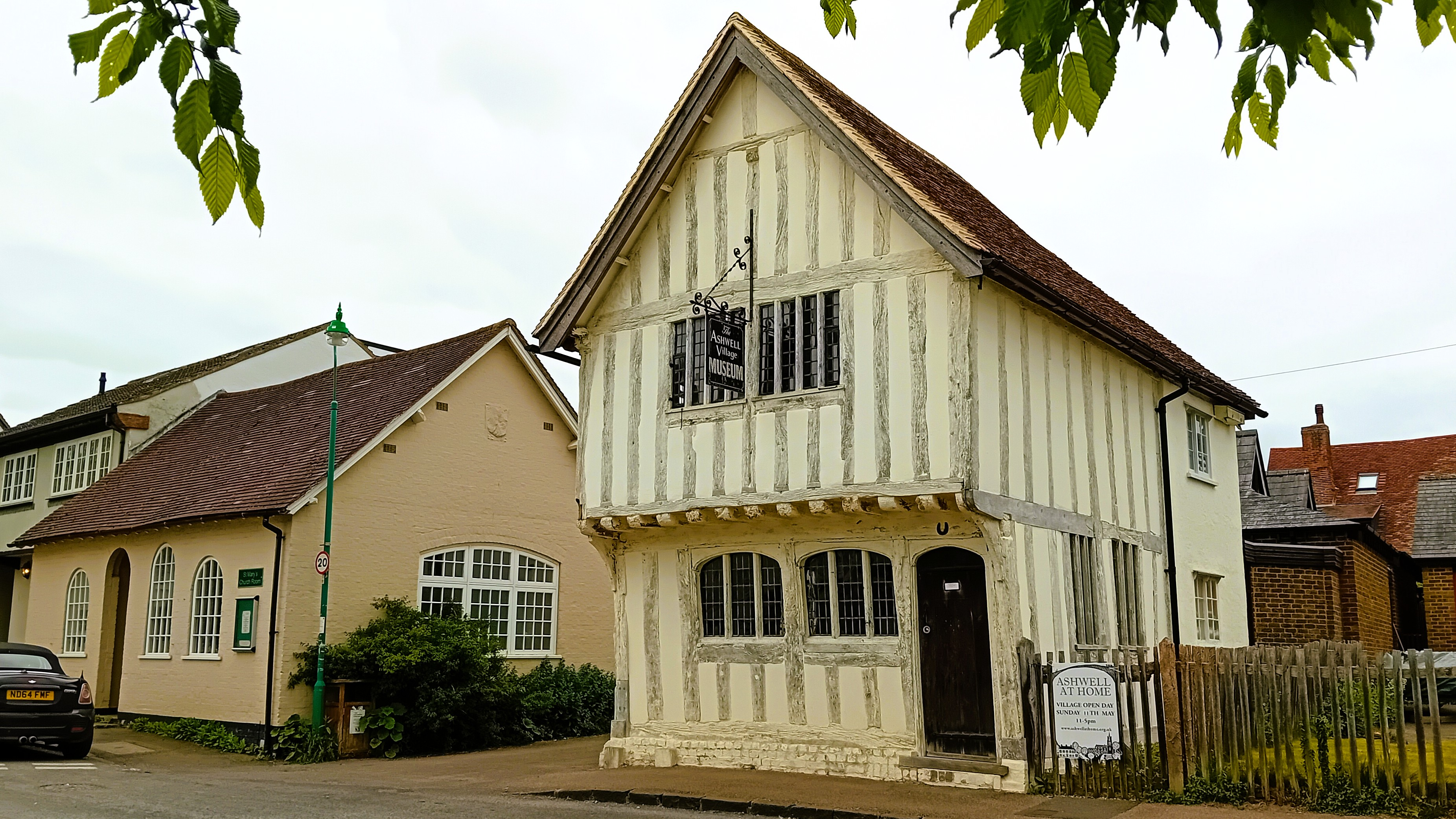
Town House, now Ashwell Museum

The village itself is generally well-maintained, encompassing the medieval cottage, town house. Listed buildings include the St. John's Guildhall of 1681, the Foresters Cottages, the Chantry House, the 16th-century town house (now Ashwell Museum), the Maltings (now converted into flats), and a small brick house which was first built in 1681 as a school by the Merchant Taylors. Ashwell Bury, a large Victorian house, which was remodeled by Edwin Lutyens in the 1920s. Lutyens also designed the Grade II listed Ashwell War Memorial, unveiled in 1922. Ashwell also has a village lock-up that was used to detain the intoxicated as well as suspected criminals. The village at one point was home to a number of local breweries and, accordingly, a variety of public houses, but currently has just three pubs: The Rose and Crown, the Three Tuns and the Bushel and Strike.

Since 1850 the village has been served by Ashwell and Morden railway station which is roughly a mile and a half from the centre of the village in the hamlet of Odsey in Cambridgeshire.

== Church ==
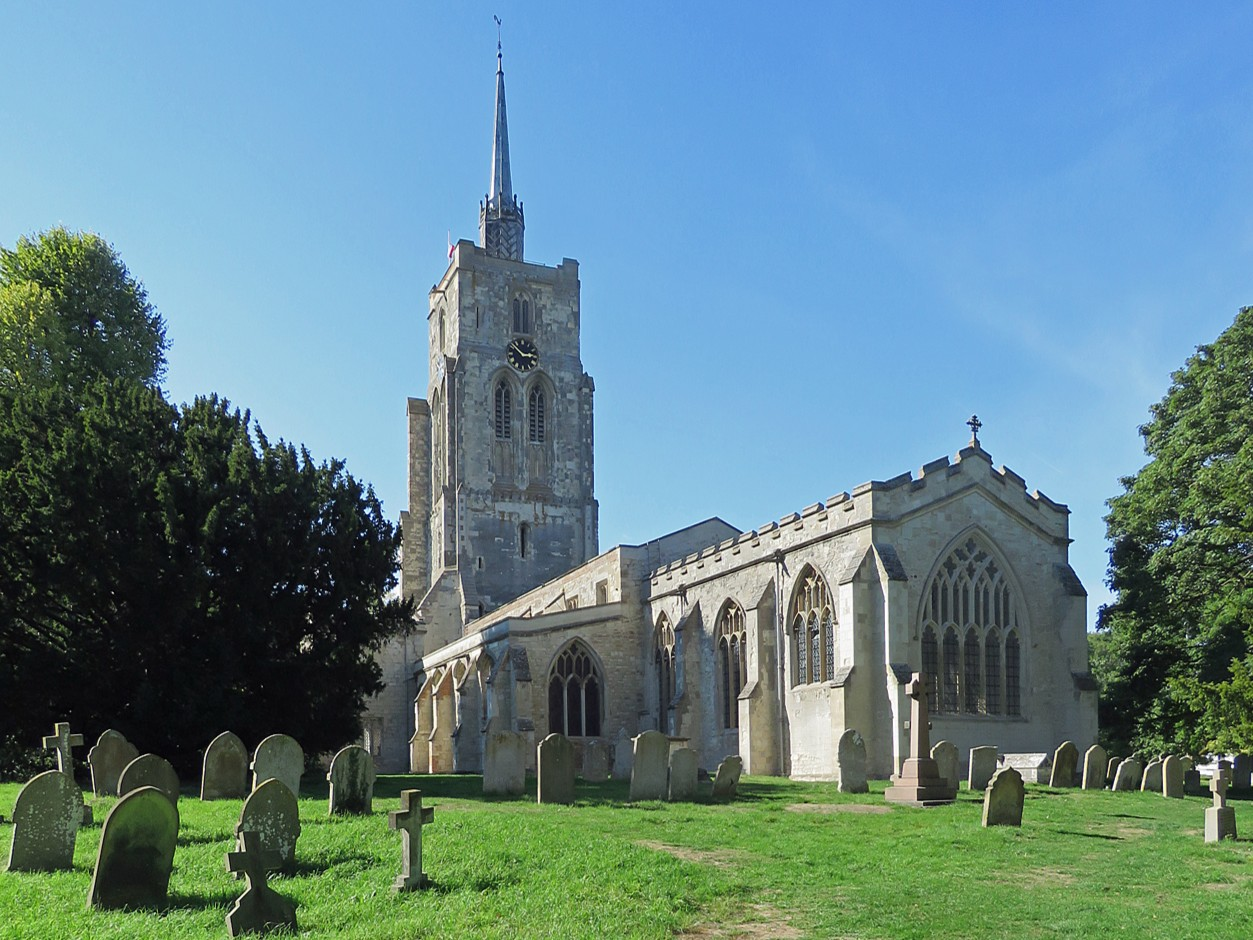
St Mary's Church

The parish church of St Mary the Virgin dates almost entirely from the 14th century and is possesses a church tower which stands at 176 feet (54 m), and is crowned by an octagonal lantern with a leaded 'spike'. The church contains medieval graffiti carved on its walls which depicts the plight of survivors of the bubonic plague. There is also a graffito depiction of Old St Paul’s Cathedral.

In 2013, the village church became the centre of a row over the quarter-hourly chiming of the clock. Complaints about the chimes during the night were initially received in the summer of that year, which North Hertfordshire District Council (NHDC) was legally obliged to investigate. In December, the council ruled that the chimes are "prejudicial to health" and must be silenced between 11 pm and 6 am. Complying with the ruling, the chimes have been disabled entirely, although the parish council has asked the Diocese of St Albans if it can install a timing mechanism to restrict the chimes to the legally appointed hours, and has launched an appeal to raise the £1,900 cost. The chiming clock was initially installed in 1898, but was turned off for 18 months in 2011 and 2012 while repairs were carried out. A public meeting on 19 January 2014 discussed the future of the chimes. In May 2015, a timer had been installed to reduce the volume of the church bells overnight.

== Geography ==
Ashwell Springs, a biological Site of Special Scientific Interest, is a perennial source of the River Cam. The water of the chalk springs contain a rare species of stenothermic flatworm (Platyhelminthes; Tricladida) associated with cold surface waters or subterranean groundwater localized to this location within East Anglia. The springs now depend upon artificial flow augmentation during dry seasons, due to the impact of local groundwater abstraction from the chalk aquifer for public water supply.

The village possesses a number of trees, contrasting with the surrounding landscape dominated by intense agricultural production, principally of wheat.

== Governance ==
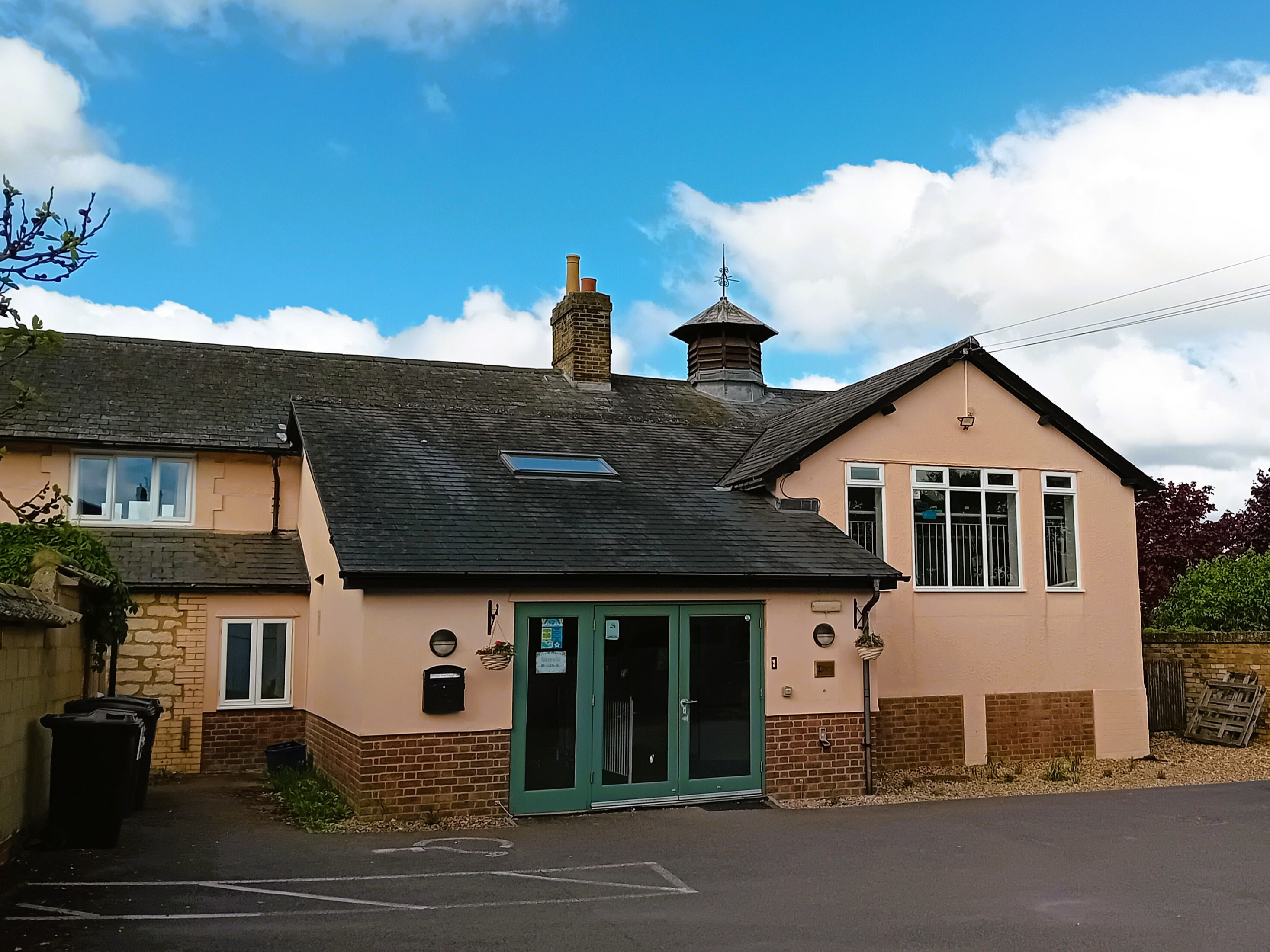
Village Hall, 20 West End

There are three tiers of local government covering Ashwell, at parish, district, and county level: Ashwell Parish Council, North Hertfordshire District Council, and Hertfordshire County Council. The parish council has an office at 6A Back Street and meets at the Parish Room at 9 Swan Street. There is also a village hall at 20 West End, which began as the maltings for Page's Brewery, before being converted into a village hall in 1922.

Ashwell is an ancient parish, and it was part of the hundred of Odsey. Ashwell was included in the Royston Poor Law Union from 1835. The Local Government Act 1894 created elected parish and district councils with effect from December 1894. The part of the Royston Poor Law Union within Hertfordshire became Ashwell Rural District; although named after Ashwell, the rural district council was always based in Royston. Ashwell Rural District was abolished in 1935, becoming part of Hitchin Rural District, which in turn was abolished in 1974, becoming part of North Hertfordshire.

== Population ==
At the 2021 census, the population of the parish was 1,980. The population had been 1,870 in 2011.

== Sport ==
Ashwell has several successful sports teams. The adult first football team are currently in the Hall's of Cambridge Sunday league premier division. The cricket team won the Cambridgeshire Junior Cup in 2003 and currently play in Division 1 of the Cambridgeshire league.

== Notable residents ==
- Erasmus Darwin Barlow, psychiatrist, businessman and great-grandson of naturalist Charles Darwin, was a long-time resident of the village.
- William Bill, Vice-Chancellor of the University of Cambridge (1548) and Dean of Westminster (1560–1561), was born in the village
- Colin Blumenau, actor, lived in the village
- Jack Blumenau, actor, lived in the village
- Peter Boston, architect and illustrator, died in the village
- Mike Bushell, BBC sports presenter, lived in the village
- Thomas Cawton, English clergyman, studied theology in the village
- Edric Cundell, English composer and conductor (at Bear House, High Street)
- William Dakins, English academic and clergyman, believed to have been born in the village
- Kiki Dee, singer best known for her 1976 duet with Elton John entitled Don't Go Breaking My Heart
- Cathie Felstead, illustrator, lives in the village
- George Joye, 16th-century Bible translator, lived in the village
- Paul Maltby, Air Vice-Marshal, lived in the village
- Herbert Palmer, English Puritan clergyman, member of the Westminster Assembly, and President of Queens' College, Cambridge, lived in the village
- Jonathan E. Sheppard, Hall of Fame trainer in American Thoroughbred horse racing, was born in the village
