= Flèche (architecture) =

Spires in Gothic architecture

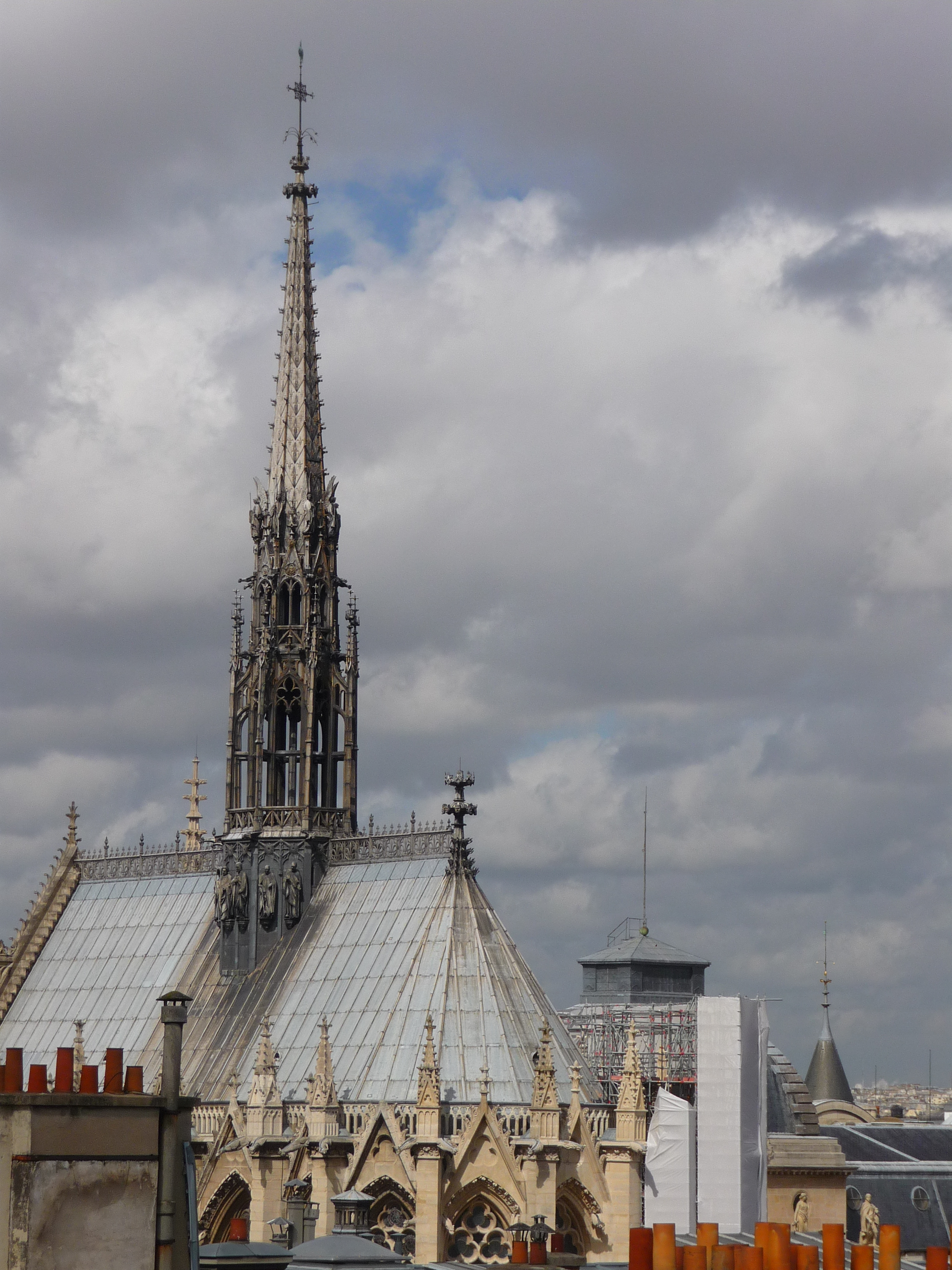
Flèche of Sainte-Chapelle, Île de la Cité, designed by Jean-Baptiste Lassus.

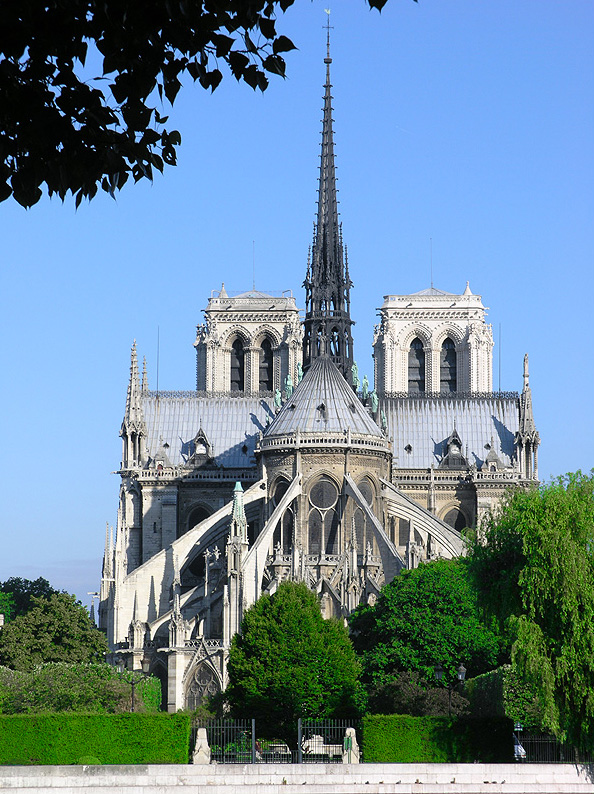
Two pictures of Notre-Dame de Paris with its 19th century flèche, lost to fire in 2019.

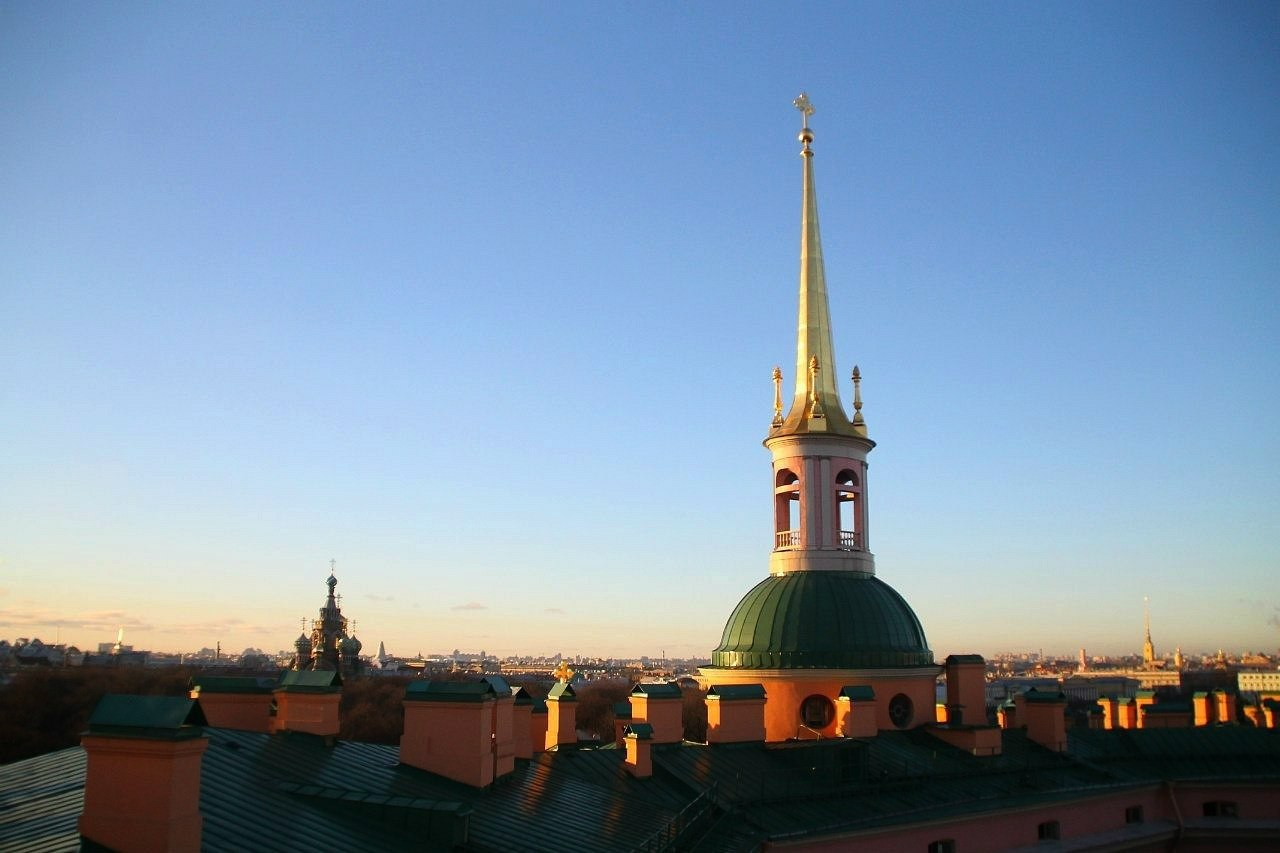
Flèche of St Michael's Castle, St Petersburg, designed by Vasily Bazhenov.

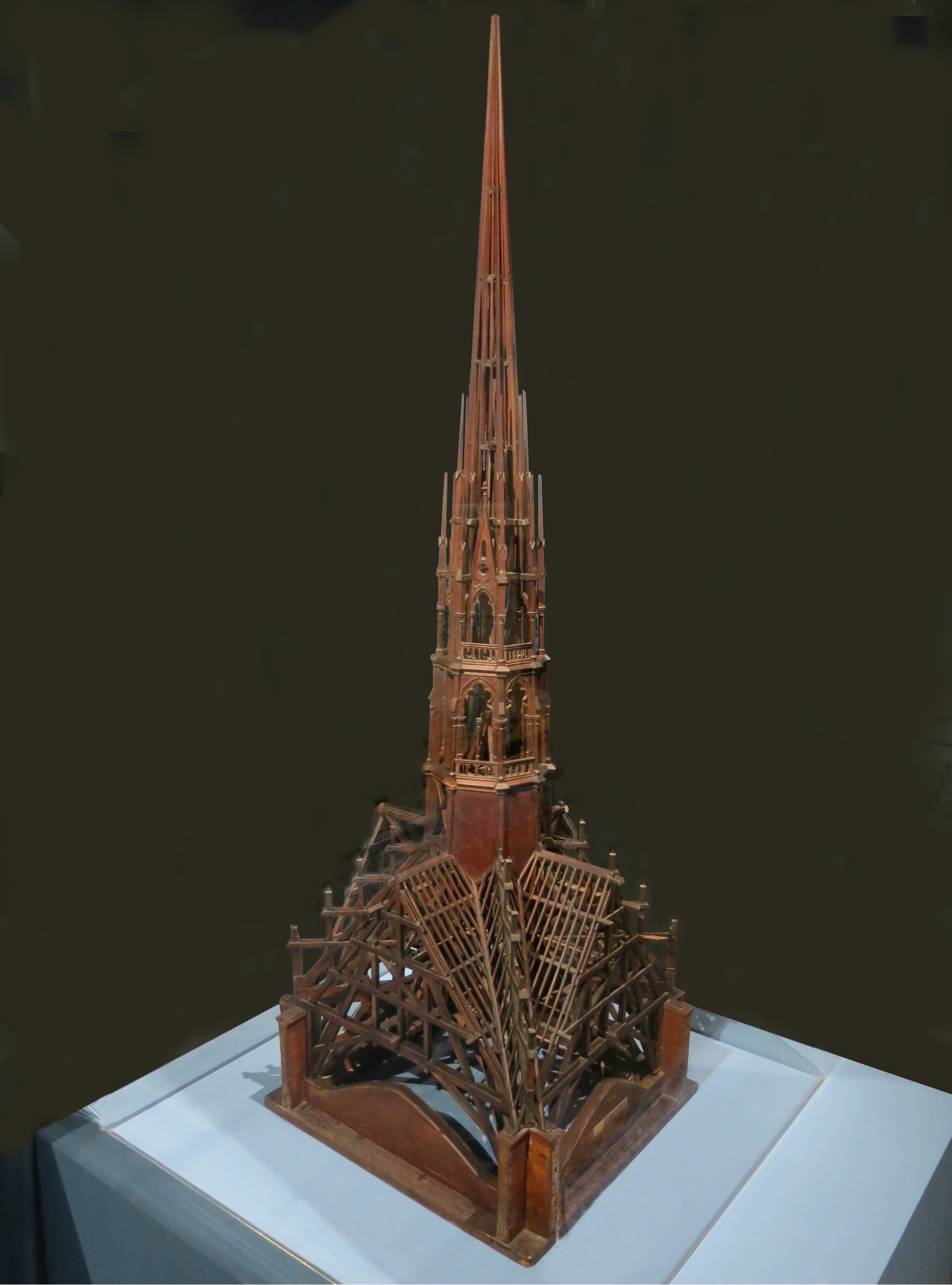
Model of the flèche of Notre-Dame de Paris made for Eugène Viollet-le-Duc (1859) (Museum of Historic Monuments, Paris)

A flèche (French: [flɛʃ]; French for 'arrow') is the name given to spires in Gothic architecture. In French, the word is applied to any spire, but in English it has the technical meaning of a spirelet or spike on the rooftop of a building. In particular, the spirelets often were built atop the crossings of major churches in mediaeval French Gothic architecture are called flèches.

On the ridge of the roof on top of the crossing (the intersection of the nave and the transepts) of a church, flèches were typically light, delicate, timber-framed constructions with a metallic sheath of lead or copper. They are often richly decorated with architectural and sculptural embellishments: tracery, crockets, and miniature buttresses serve to adorn the flèche.

Flèches are often very tall: the Gothic Revival spire of Notre-Dame de Paris (1858–2019) by Eugène Viollet-le-Duc was about 100 feet (30 m) before its destruction in the Notre-Dame de Paris fire, while the 16th century flèche of Amiens Cathedral is 148 feet (45 m) high.

A short spire or flèche surrounded by a parapet is common on churches in Hertfordshire; as a result, this type of flèche is called a Hertfordshire spike.

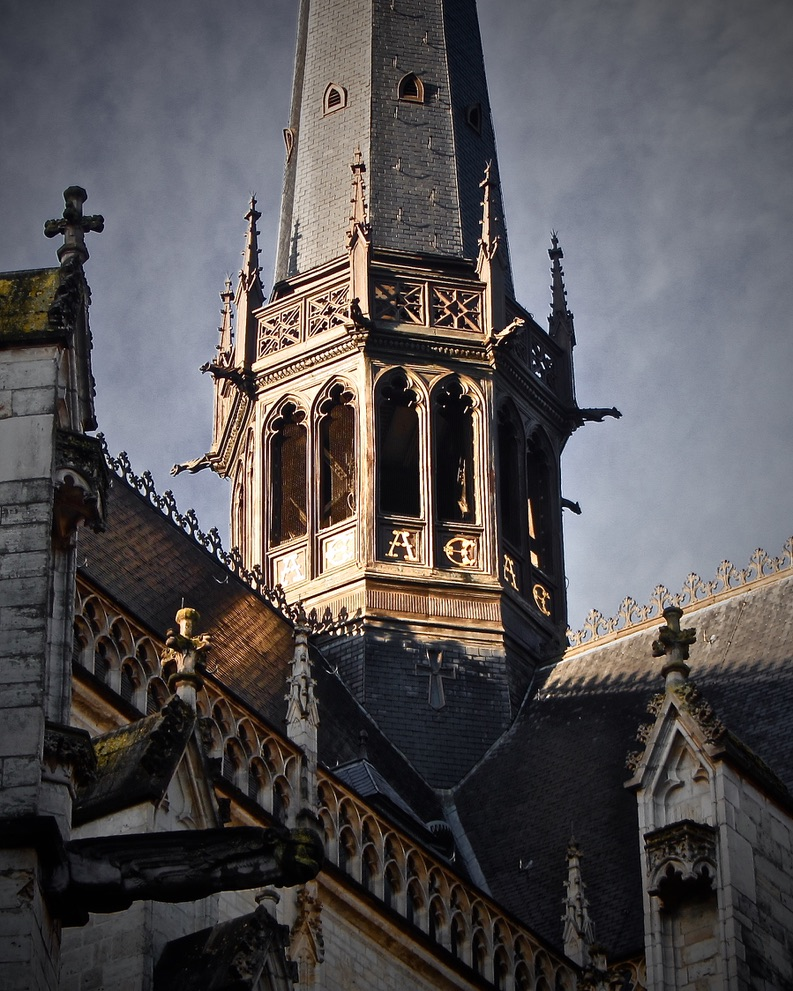
The Gothic Revival flèche on the St. Peter's Church of Leuven, Belgium.

== See also ==
- Flèche faîtière
- Ridge turret
