= Arbury Banks, Hertfordshire =

Hill fort southwest of Ashwell, Hertfordshire, England

Coordinates: 52°01′56″N 00°09′46″W

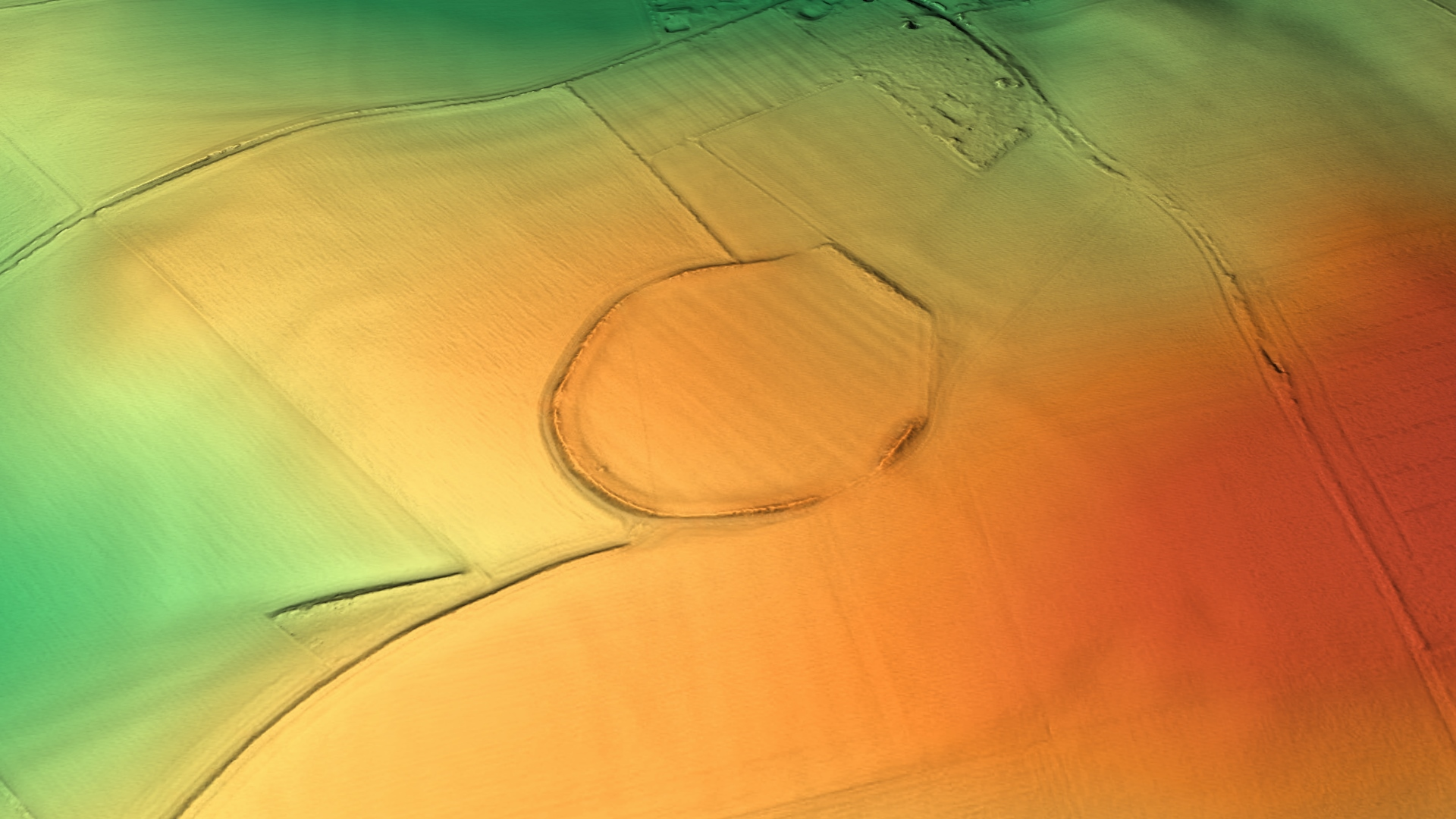
3D view of the digital terrain model

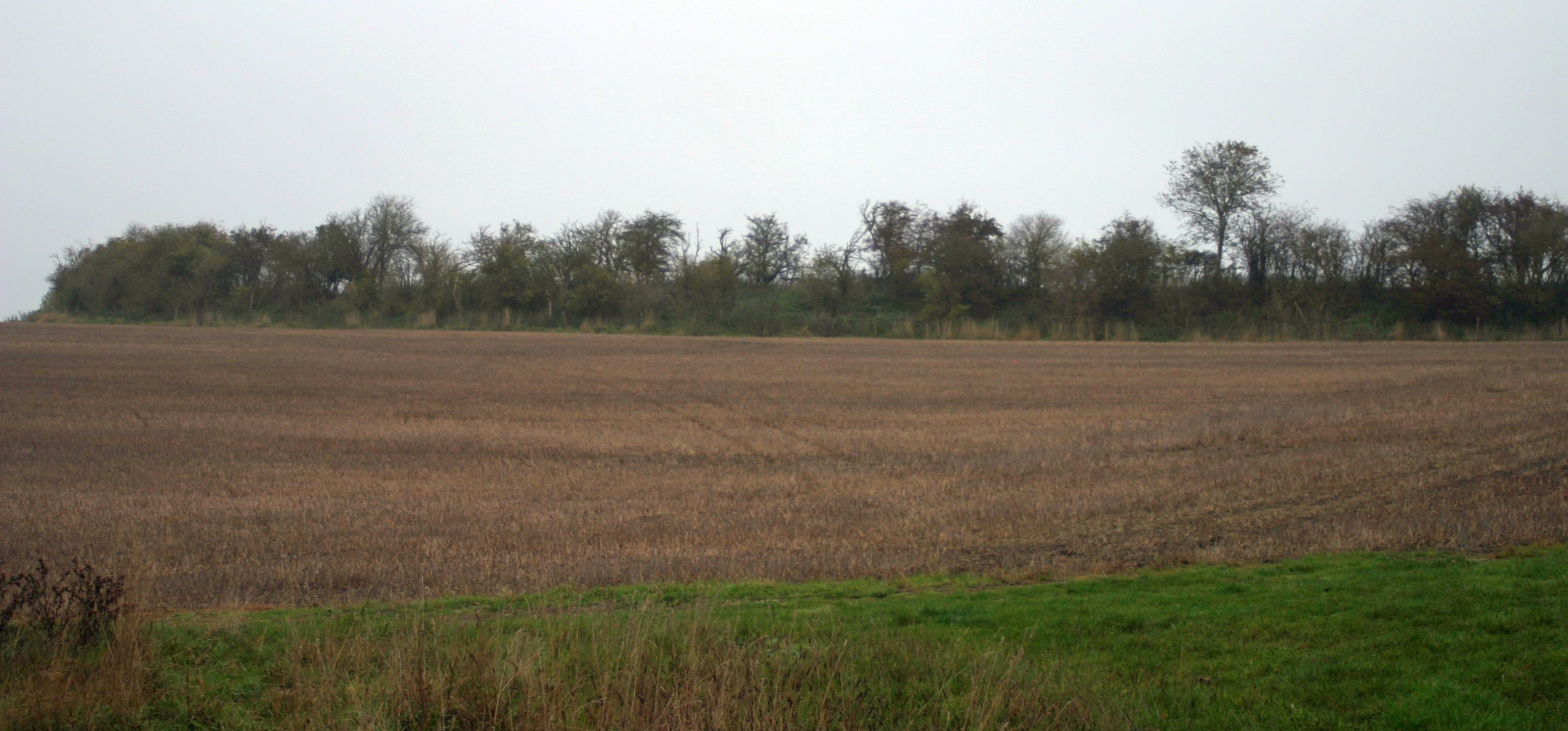
Arbury Banks hill fort. Viewed from footpath to the southwest

Arbury Banks is a hill fort southwest of Ashwell, Hertfordshire, England.

It was probably first constructed during the late Bronze Age, 1000-700 BC. Standing at 90 m (300 ft) above sea level, it is one of a line of six similar hill forts along the northern Chilterns that includes Wilbury Hill Camp southwest of Letchworth. Excavations in the 1850s traced Arbury Banks' horseshoe-shaped ramparts and identified two opposed north-north-west and south-south-east entrances. Evidence was also discovered for several enclosures or buildings inside the fort.

Arbury Banks has been suggested as a possible location for the Battle of Watling Street, where a small Roman force destroyed the army of Boudica.

The site is a scheduled monument.

Ordnance Survey grid reference: TL261387
