= Oughtonhead =

Oughtonhead may refer to:

- Oughtonhead Common, a Local Nature Reserve in Hitchin
- Oughtonhead Lane, Site of Special Scientific Interest in Hitchin
- Oughtonhead Nature Reserve, a Herts and Middlesex Wildlife Trust nature reserve in Hitchin

== See also ==
- Oughton
- River Oughton
