= Holy Trinity Church, Weston =

Church in Hertfordshire, England

Coordinates: 51.9537°N 0.1593°W

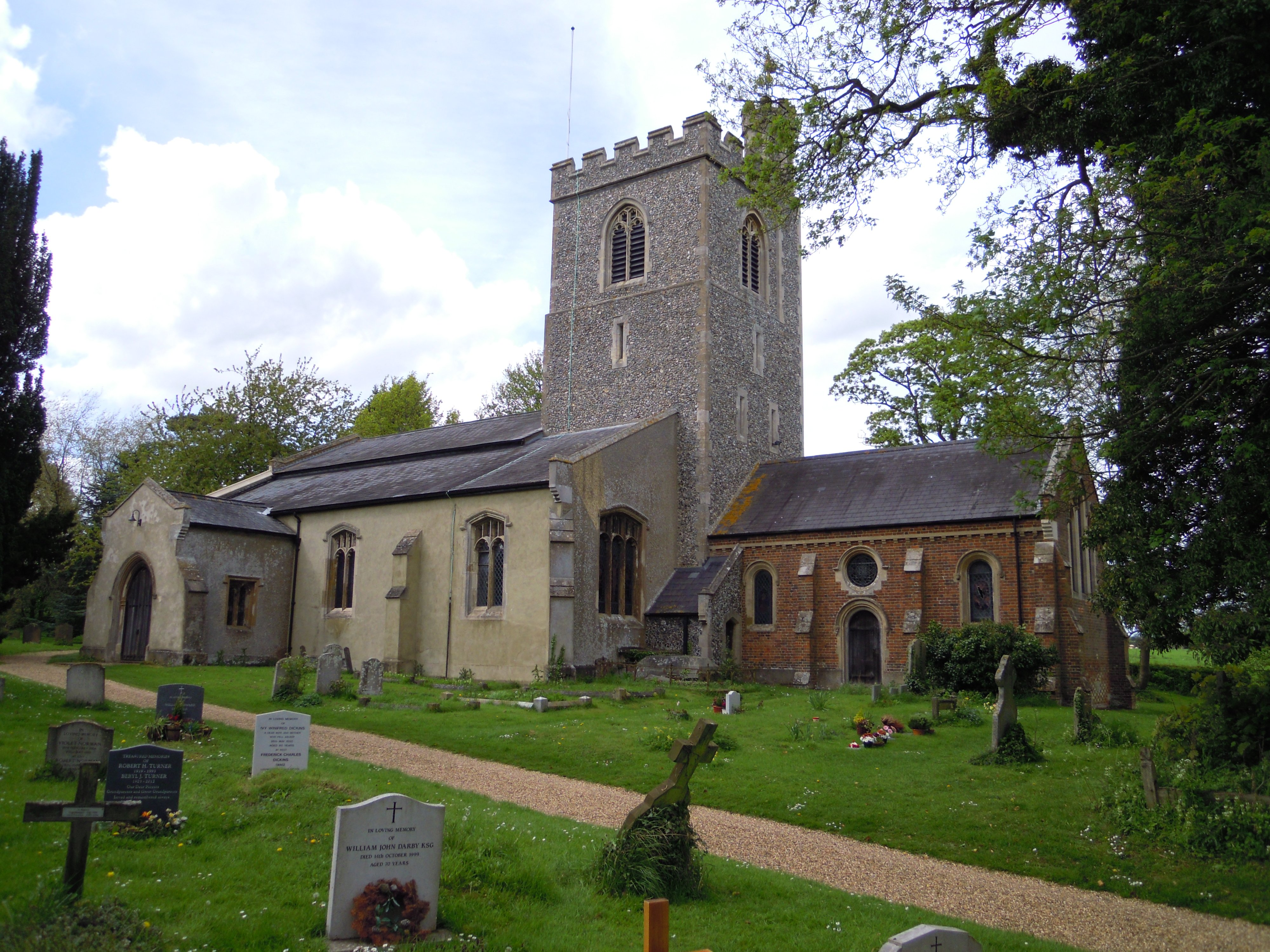
Holy Trinity Church in Weston

Holy Trinity Church is the parish church for the village of Weston in Hertfordshire. The church building stands to the south-east of the village on high ground, and is built of flint and coursed ironstone rubble. It was Grade I listed in 1968. In the churchyard is the supposed grave of the giant Jack o'Legs.

== History ==
The Domesday Book of 1086 mentions two priests at Weston but says nothing of a church being there.

The advowson of the church was awarded by Gilbert de Clare to the Knights Templar before 1148. This was later confirmed by William Marshall, Earl of Pembroke. The Knights Templars held the advowson until 1309, when their order was suppressed, and it then passed to the Knights Hospitallers.

In 1481, the inhabitants of Weston complained that their vicar John Hawthorn was 'a common player, and daily played le Penyprykke and Bowles'. He was duly warned to amend his ways under penalty of a fine of 12d.

Today the parish comes under the Diocese of St Albans.

== Design and features ==
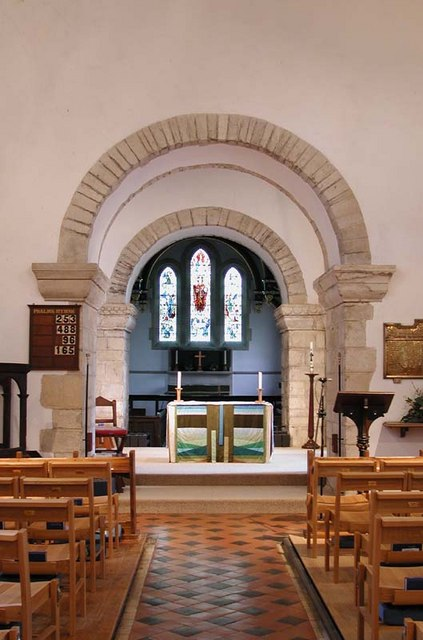
The altar in Holy Trinity church

The current church was built in the traditional cruciform shape in the 12th century, with the south aisle, south porch, clerestory, new windows, and south transept being added in the 15th century. The chancel was rebuilt to a Neo-Norman design in brick coated with stucco in 1840 by Thomas Smith for the Rev. Benjamin Donne. The church underwent a restoration in 1867 including the addition of the upper stage of the tower, while the vestry was added in 1880. The nave is rendered and the tower and north transept are of flint and coursed rubble. The nave roof dates to the 15th century, and rests on original grotesque corbels. The font also dates to the 15th century and is octagonal. The sides of the bowl, which is moulded, have quatrefoiled panels, and the stem is also moulded and panelled.

The octagonal oak pulpit with open arcading on an octagonal moulded base was moved to the church in 1840 from the Church of St Mary the Less in Cambridge, where it is said to have been used by Jeremy Taylor. The five bells in the belfry are: the treble by John Waylett (1716); the second and third by Miles Graye (1634); the fourth by Warner & Sons (1867); and the tenor by R. Chandler (1682).

== Jack o'Legs ==
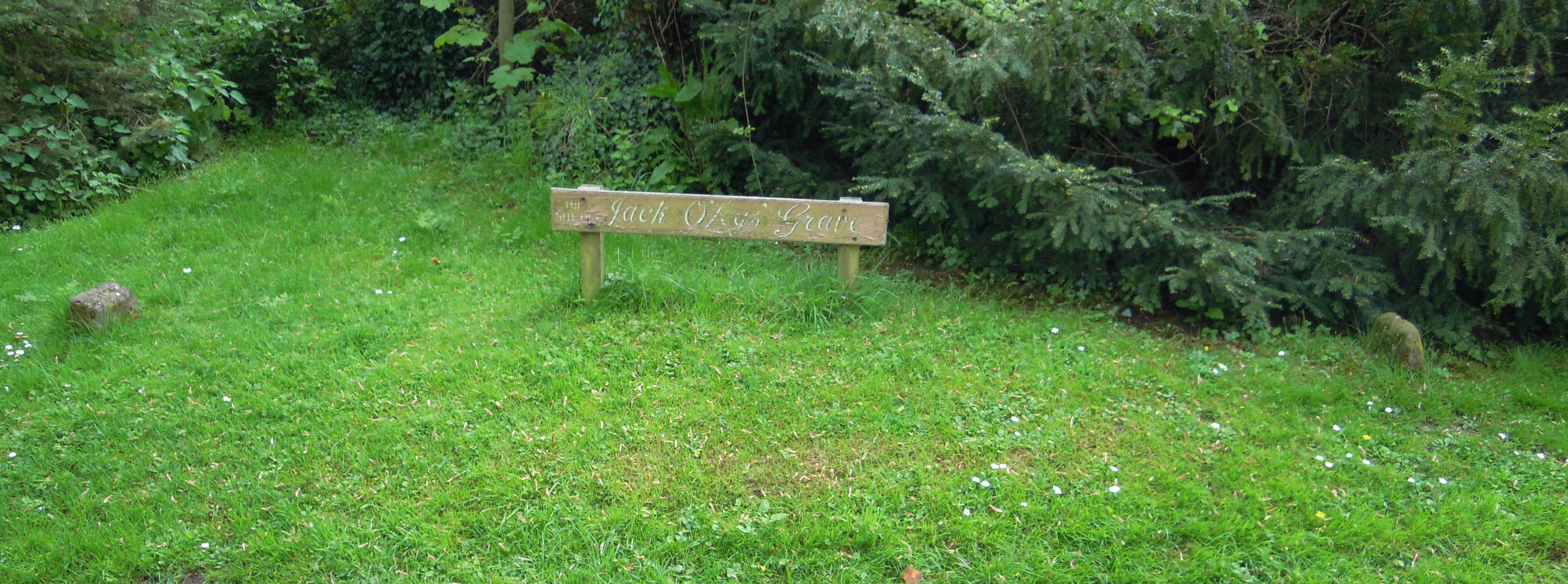
Grave of Jack o'Legs in the churchyard of Holy Trinity Church

In the churchyard is the supposed grave of Jack o'Legs, who, according to local legend, lived in a cave in a wood at Weston and who stole food from the people of nearby Baldock. The grave is unusually long and was possibly placed there to fuel belief in the legend.

== Gallery ==
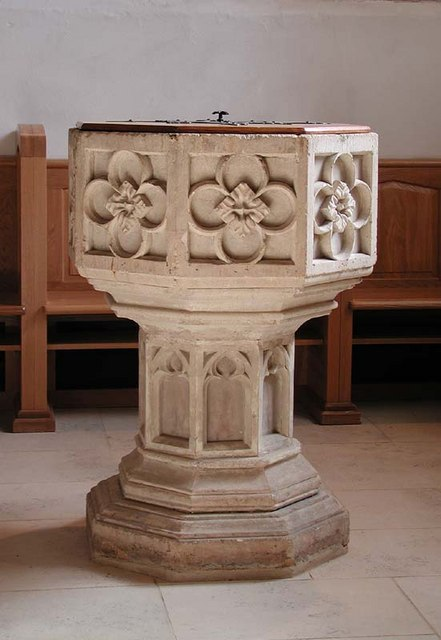
The font

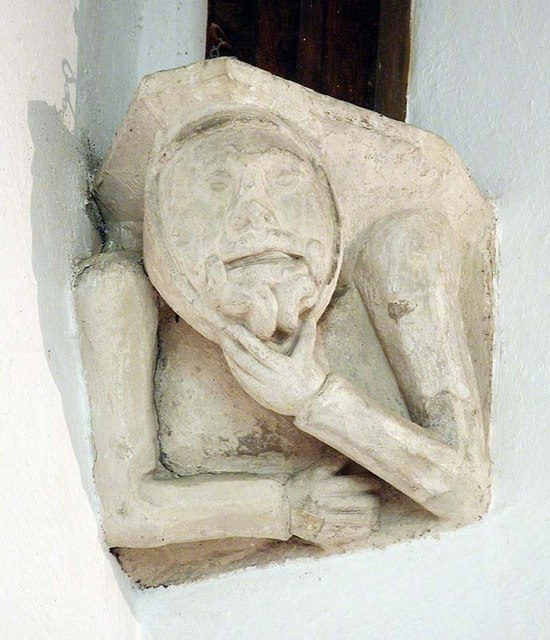
A corbel

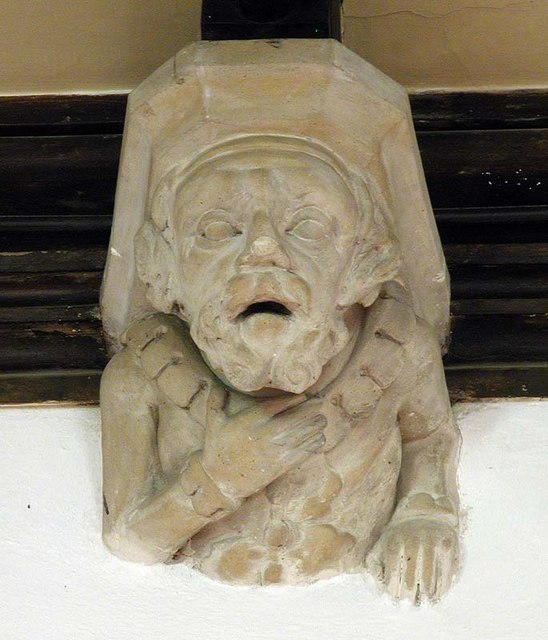
A corbel
