= Oughton =

Oughton is an English surname. Notable people with the surname include:

- Adolphus Oughton (c. 1685–1736), British Army officer and politician
- Deborah Oughton, Norwegian radiochemist
- Diana Oughton (1942–1970), American radical
- Duncan Oughton (born 1977), New Zealand (soccer) footballer
- George Oughton (1842–1898), bandleader and organist in South Australia, son of Samuel
- Jack Oughton (1876– after 1940), American stonemason
- James Adolphus Oughton (1720–1780), British soldier
- James H. Oughton (1913–1996), American businessman and politician
- Samuel Oughton (1803–1881), Baptist missionary to Jamaica

== See also ==
- Hitchin Oughton, an electoral ward in England
- Oughtonhead
- Orton (disambiguation)
