= Lannock Mill, Weston =

Windmill in Hertfordshire, England

Weston Windmill
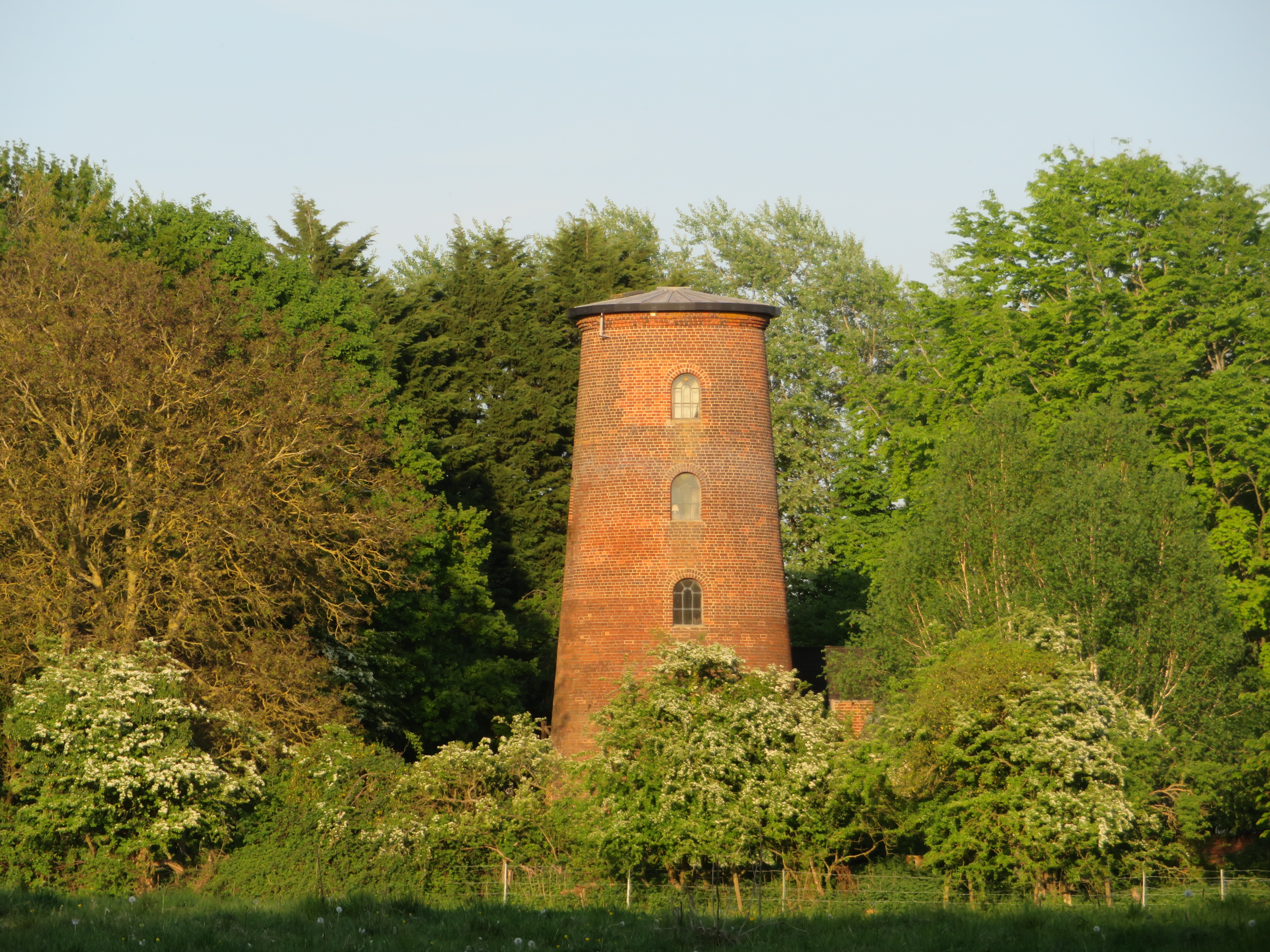
- Viewed from Hitchin Road to west

Origin
- Mill name: Lannock Mill
- Mill location: TL 253 306
- Coordinates: 51°57′35″N 0°10′31″W
- Operator(s): Private
- Year built: 1860

Information
- Purpose: Corn mill
- Type: Tower mill
- Storeys: Five storeys
- No. of sails: Four sails
- Type of sails: Single Patent sails
- Winding: Fantail
- Fantail blades: Eight blades
- Auxiliary power: Steam engine, later replaced by a gas engine
- No. of pairs of millstones: Four pairs

Lannock Mill, also known as Weston Windmill, is a Grade II listed tower mill at Weston, Hertfordshire, England. The mill is no longer operational, and has had its cap, sails and machinery removed.

== History ==
Lannock Mill was built in 1860. A windmill had previously been shown on Warburton's map dated 1720 and Thomas Kitchin's map dated 1749. The mill was built by Richard Christy, who worked it until his son Richard took over in 1868. In 1882, Richard Christy Jr emigrated to America and the mill was taken over by Thomas Sanderson. He installed a steam engine as auxiliary power. The mill was badly damaged in a storm in the late 1880s. Repairs including new sails and cap were carried out by Course's, the Biggleswade millwrights. The steam engine was eventually replaced by a gas engine. The mill was working by wind into the early 1920s and by engine until 1929. The mill was stripped of machinery over the years, leaving the tower standing today.

== Description ==
Lannock Mill is a five storey tower mill. The tower is 21 feet (6.40 m) internal diameter at the base with walls 2 feet (610 mm) thick. It is 15 feet (4.57 m) diameter at curb level with walls 1 foot 4 inches (410 mm) thick. The tower is 48 feet (14.63 m) to the curb. The mill stood over 60 feet (18.29 m) high to the top of the cap finial. It had an ogee cap winded by an eight bladed fantail. There were four Single Patent sails. The mill drove four pairs of millstones. The great spur wheel was of cast iron.

== Millers ==
- Richard Christy 1860-68
- Richard Christy Jr 1868-82
- Thomas Sanderson 1868-88
- Charles T Stratton 1888-1929

Reference for above:-
