= Weston, Hertfordshire =

Village in Hertfordshire, England

Coordinates: 51.95692°N 0.16777°W

Weston
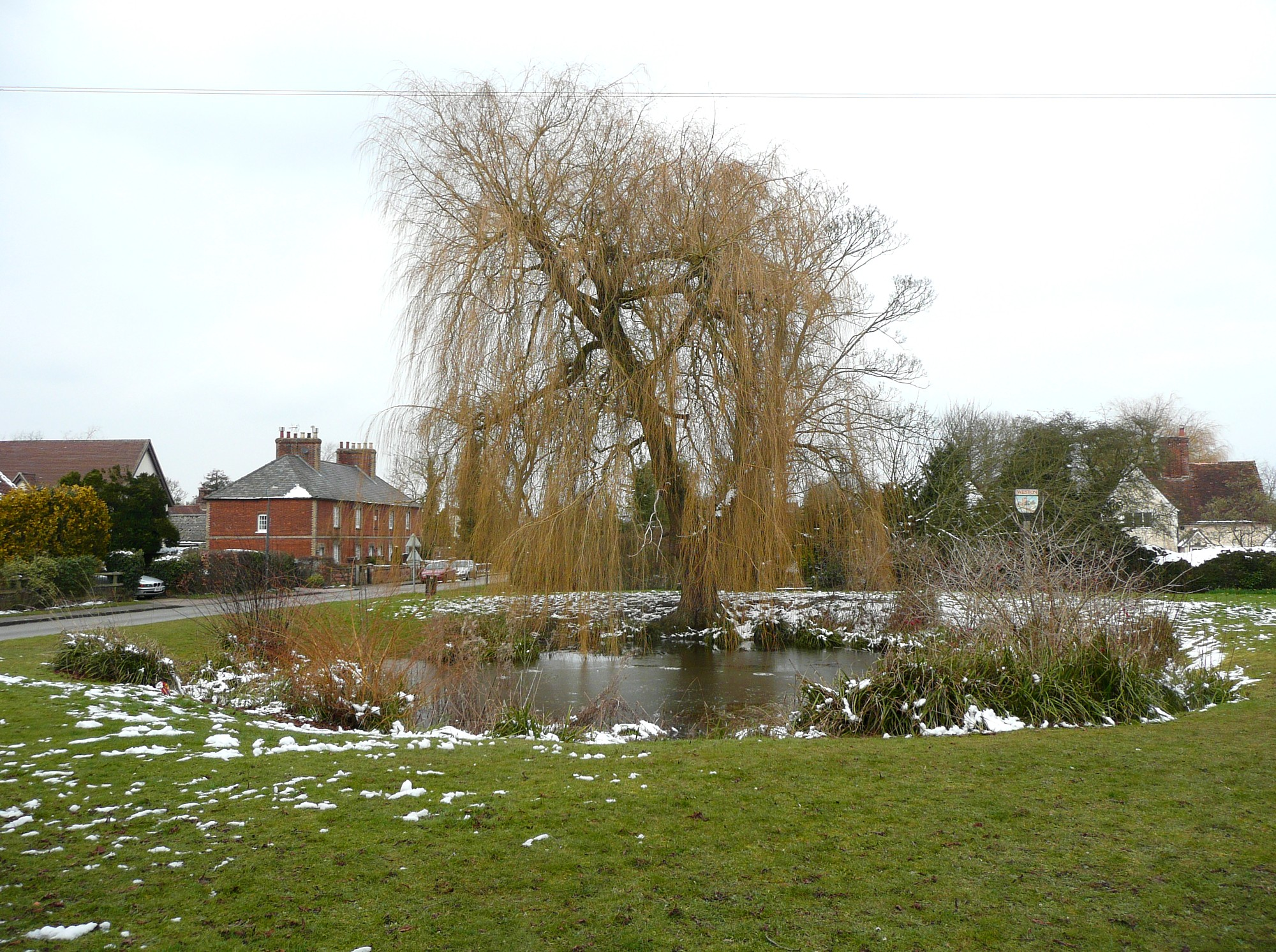
- Pond on the village green

- Location within Hertfordshire
- Population: 1,035 (Parish, 2021)
- OS grid reference: TL260303
- District: North Hertfordshire
- Shire county: Hertfordshire
- Region: East
- Country: England
- Sovereign state: United Kingdom
- Post town: HITCHIN
- Postcode district: SG4
- Dialling code: 01462
- Police: Hertfordshire
- Fire: Hertfordshire
- Ambulance: East of England
- UK Parliament: North East Hertfordshire

Weston is a village and civil parish in the North Hertfordshire district of Hertfordshire, England. The village stands on a plateau of high ground, about 2 miles (3 km) south of Baldock, its nearest town, although Weston's post town is Hitchin, 5 miles (8 km) to the west. The parish includes extensive rural areas as well as the village itself, including the hamlet of Hall's Green to the south-east of the village. At the northern end of the parish are the Weston Hills, where the plateau drops down to the southern edges of Baldock. The Weston Hills Tunnel carries the A505 Baldock bypass under the hills. The parish had a population of 1,035 at the 2021 census.

== History ==
Weston appears in the Domesday Book of 1086, when it was described as having 75 households. Two priests were mentioned, suggesting Weston was already a parish. At that time Weston included the site where the Knights Templar would later develop the town of Baldock in the 12th century. The northern tip of Weston parish was ceded to become the new parish of Baldock around that time. The concession was modest; the parish of Baldock originally had an area of just 158 acres (64 ha), whereas the remainder of Weston parish had an area of 4,555 acres (1,843 ha).

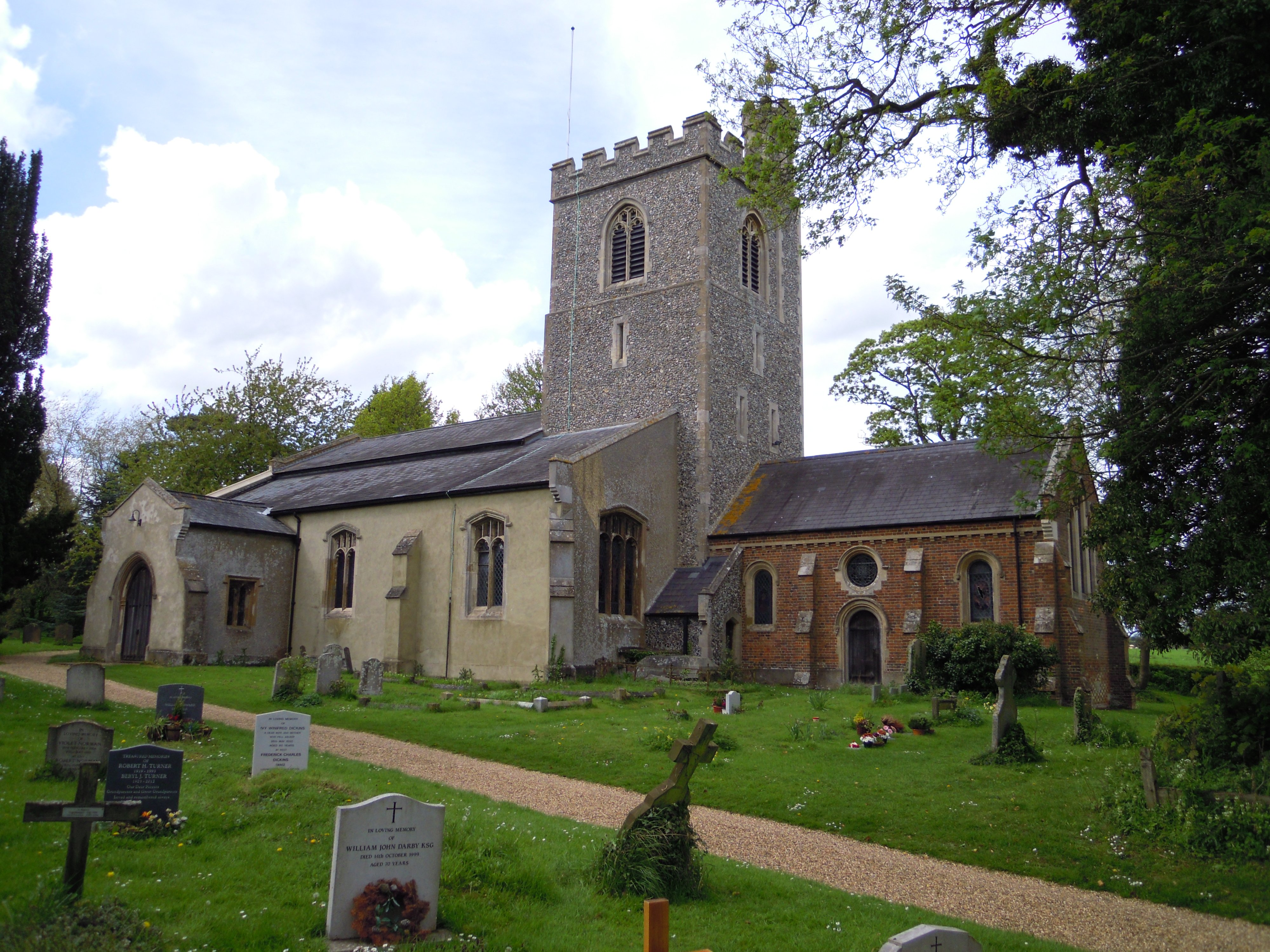
Holy Trinity Church

Holy Trinity Church stands on the south-eastern edge of the village and dates back to the 12th century. The main part of the village subsequently developed along Fore Street, Maiden Street and Damask Green Road, which meet at a small village green with a pond, about half a mile west of the church.

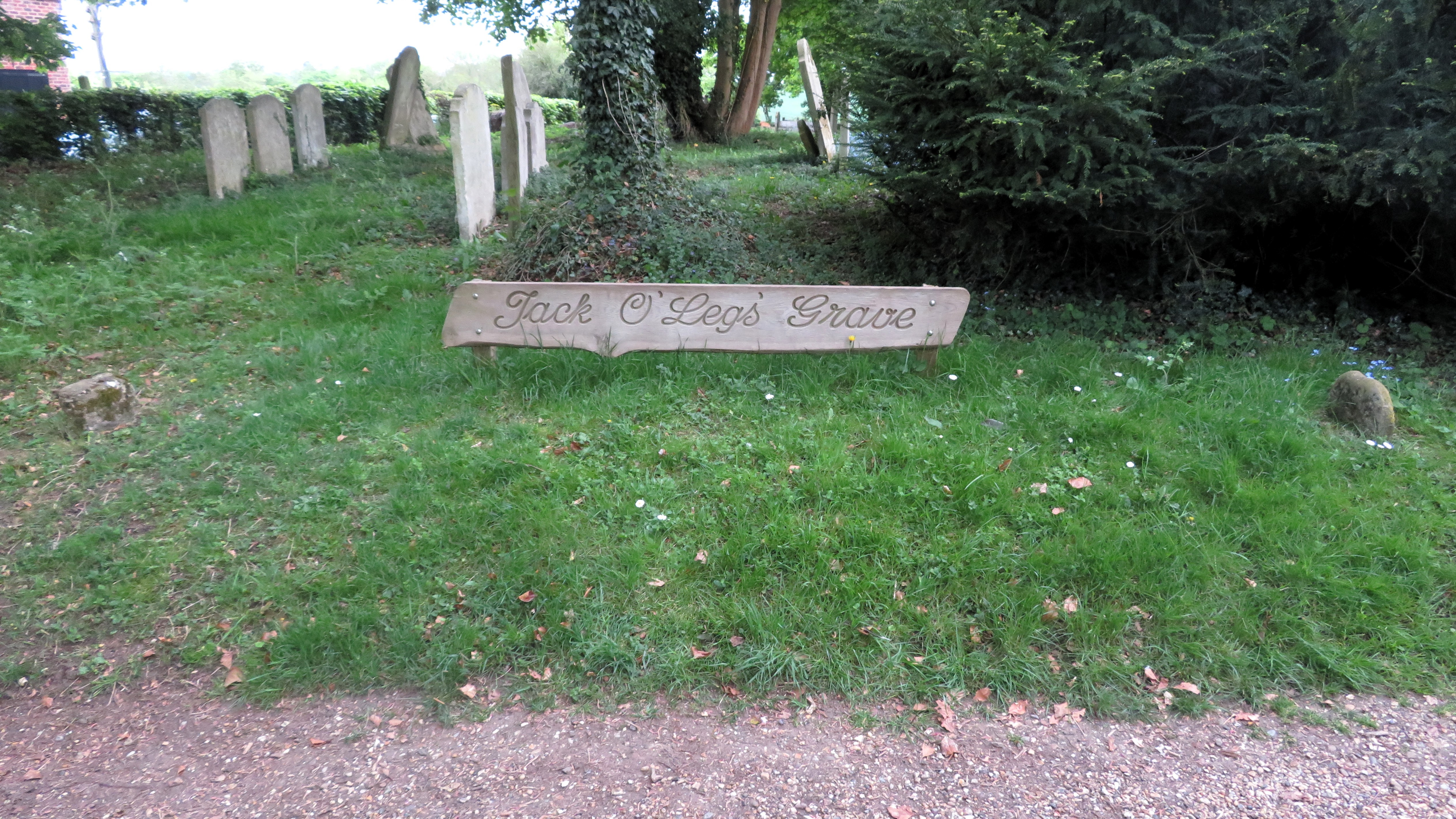
Reputed grave of Jack o'Legs in the churchyard of Holy Trinity Church

There is a local legend of a giant called Jack o'Legs, who is said to have lived in a cave in the area and stole from the shopkeepers in Baldock to give to the poor in Weston. On being caught and either mortally wounded or sentenced to death (versions differ) he asked to be allowed to shoot an arrow to indicate where he wanted to be buried. The arrow flew three miles to the churchyard at Weston. Stones and a sign in the churchyard still mark his supposed grave. The earliest documented reference to Jack o'Legs dates from 1521, but in a context suggesting it was already a well-known story.

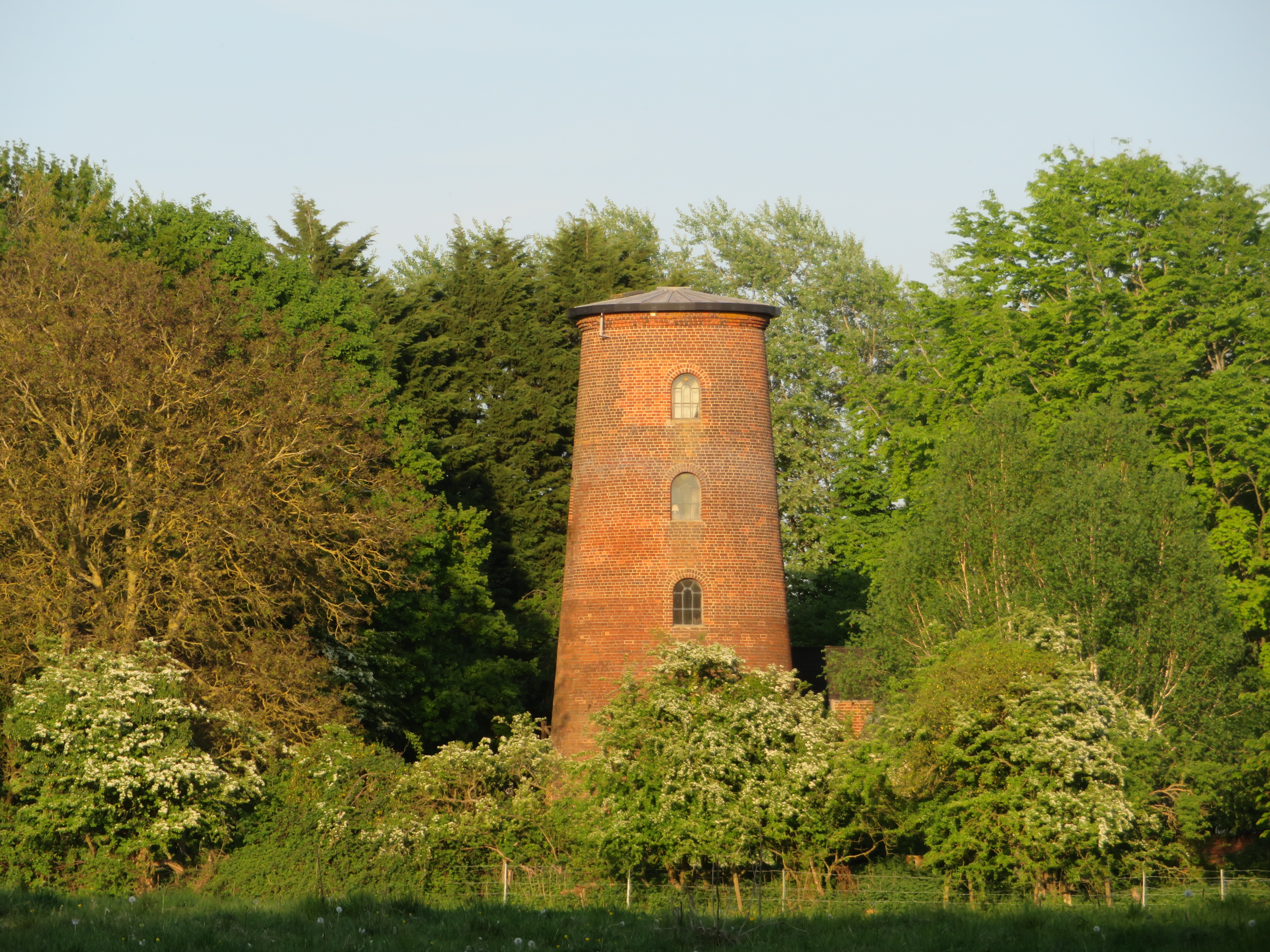
Weston Windmill, also known as Lannock Mill

Weston Windmill, also known as Lannock Mill, was built in 1860 to the west of the village. It is no longer operational, and has lost its cap, sails and machinery. The surviving tower has been converted to other uses.

Weston Road and the Village of Weston, both within Toronto, Canada, were named after this place.

== Facilities ==
Weston village today has a primary school, village hall, a shop, and a pub, the Cricketers. There is another pub, the Rising Sun, in the hamlet of Hall's Green.

== Governance ==
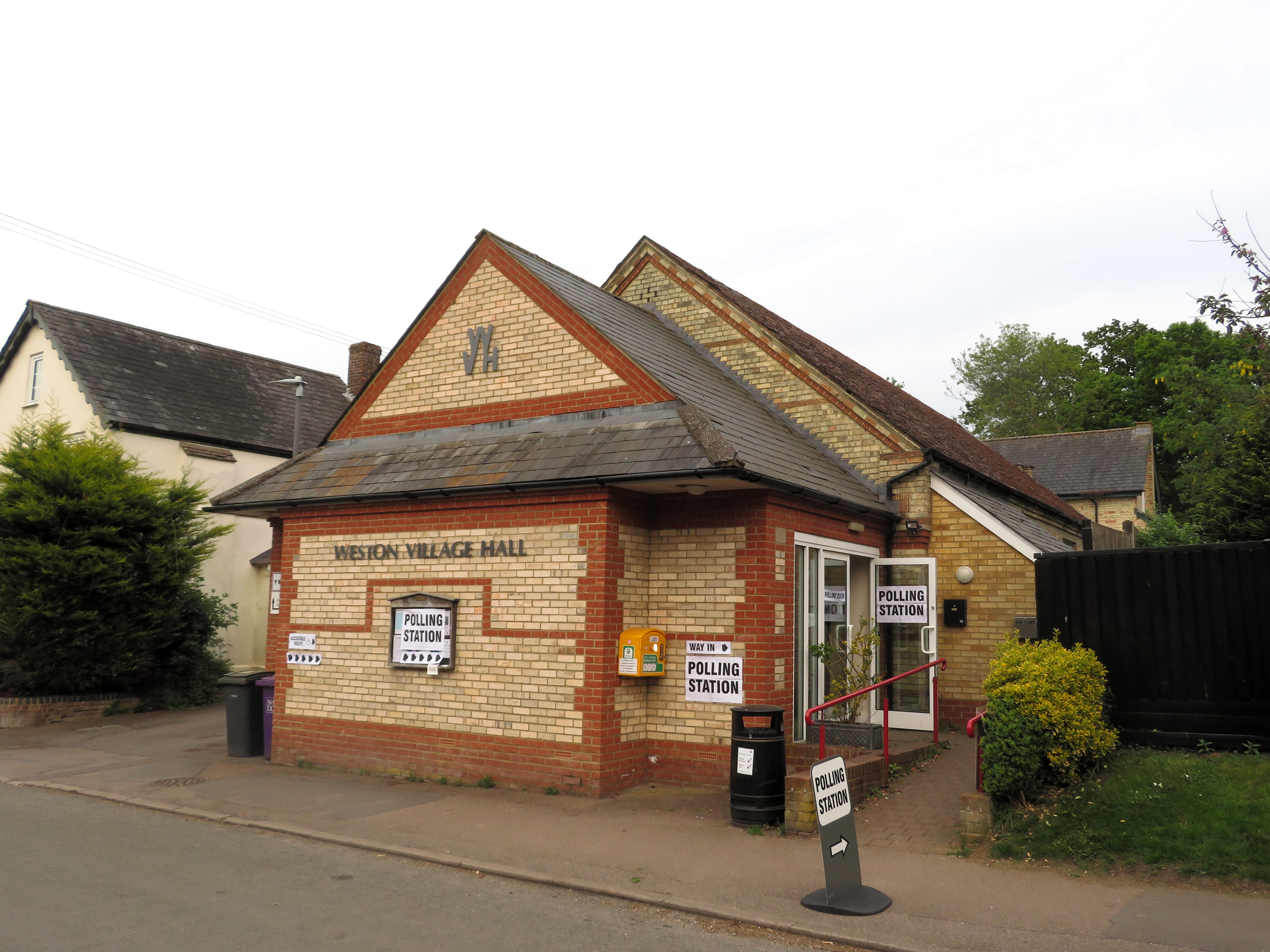
Weston Village Hall

There are three tiers of local government covering Weston, at parish, district, and county level: Weston Parish Council, North Hertfordshire District Council, and Hertfordshire County Council. The parish council meets at the village hall on Maiden Street.

== Population ==
At the 2021 census, the population of the parish was 1,035. The population had been 1,054 in 2011.

== See also ==
- Weston, Ontario

== Gallery ==
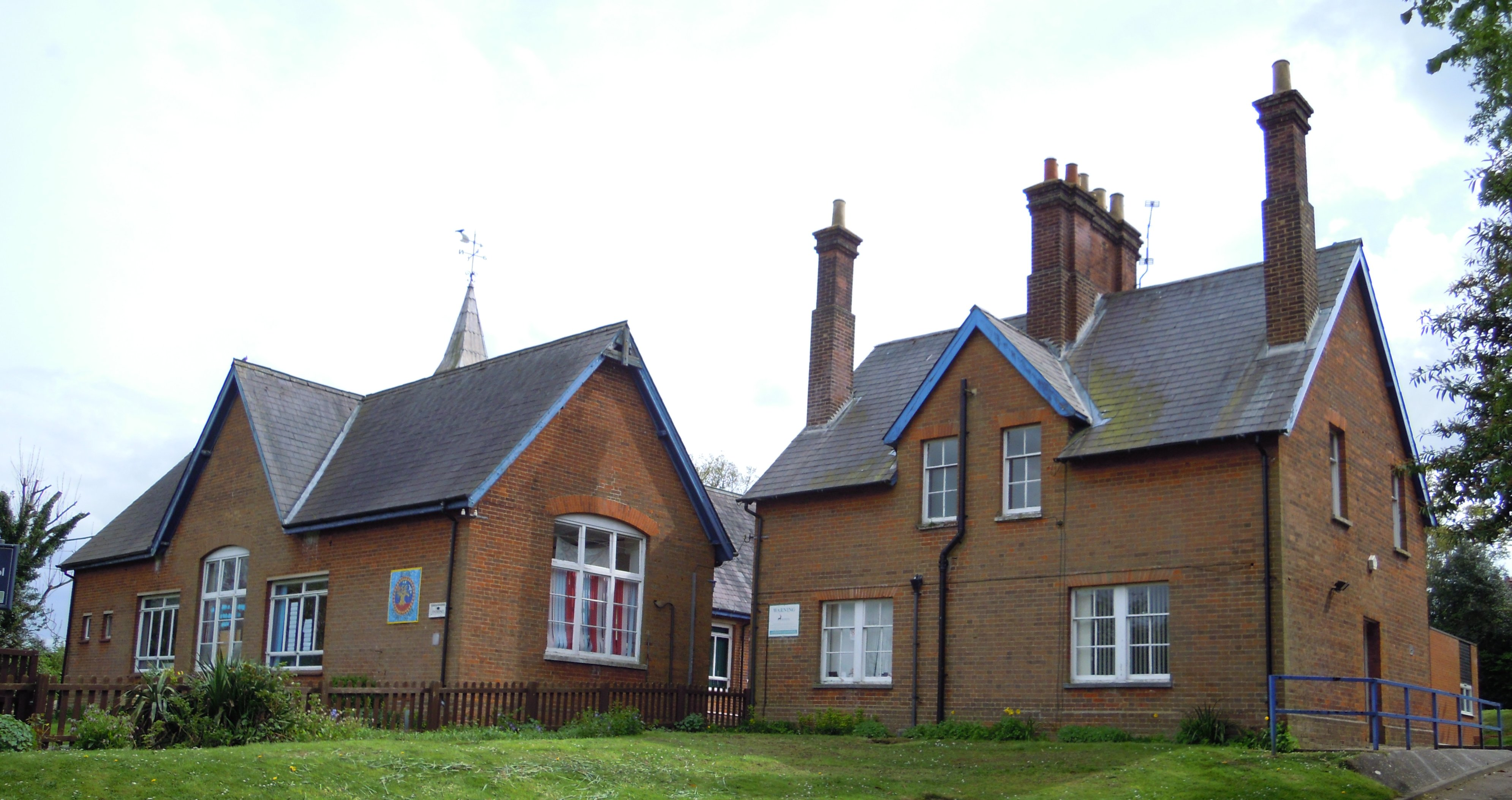
Weston (CofE) Primary School and Nursery

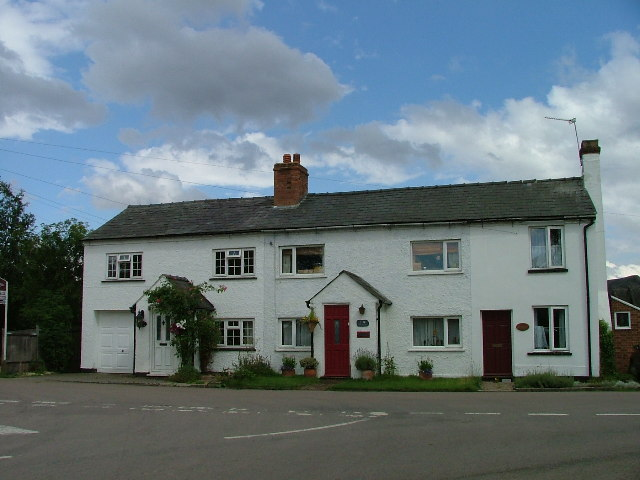
A row of cottages at Weston
