= Miles Graye =

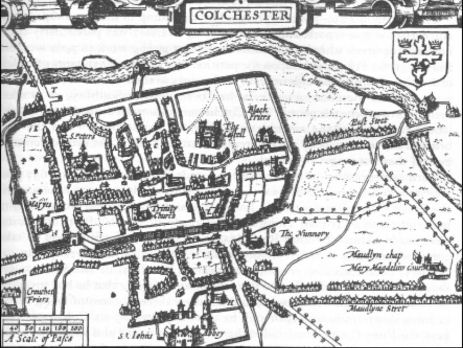
In John Speed's map of Colchester from 1610, Head Gate is shown in the lower left corner, and Miles Graye's bell-foundry was in Head Street nearby

Miles Graye was a dynasty of English bell-founders; who had foundries in Colchester and Saffron Walden in Essex, during the 17th-century. It is believed that the family cast over 415 bells, many of which remain in use today.

There were three generations of bell founders of that name, who cast in their two foundries. They were also journeymen craftsmen who travelled around East Anglia making bells in the fields and churchyards, and who practised their craft from the reign of Queen Elizabeth I to King James II. A Miles Graye is recorded as being a householder in Colchester in 1567, and it was his son who became the famous bell-founder, Miles Graye I.

== Miles Graye I (c1575-1649) ==
Miles Graye I has been described as 'the prince of bell-founders', and began his career as an apprentice at a foundry in Colchester, which belonged to a Richard Bowler. The exact date of his birth is not known, but it was probably in about 1575. His first recorded bell was cast for St Andrew's church in Bulmer in Essex in 1600. The first reference to him as a bell-founder in The Church Bells of Essex is 'by no means creditable to him'. In 1598, Miles was examined by the bailiffs at the Colchester Quarter Sessions and made a voluntary confession accepting that "he is the father of the child with which Alice Mullynges is pregnant", he presumably having met the young woman at the house of Richard Bowler, and who may well have been a domestic servant there. However, Miles did the decent thing and shortly after he married her. His will states that Miles Graye I had four children living at the time of his death: Miles II, James, Ann and Mary. His wife Alice must have died some time previously as he leaves most of his property to 'Dorothy my loving wife'. His will was first written in 1643 and in it he described himself as 'being weak in body and crazed with age, but yet in perfect mind and memory'. His foundry was at Head Street in Colchester. He died in 1649 and it is possible that he endured some financial difficulty in his last year arising from the Siege of Colchester of 1648 during the Civil War when his will of 1649 records that some of his property including his bell-foundry in Head Street was destroyed by fire.

== Miles Graye II (c1599-1666) ==
Miles Graye II married Jane Banishe of Stratford in 1622, and the Saffron Walden parish registers record the baptismal entries of several children of "Miles Gray and of Jane his wife", namely Jacob, 26 November 1630; Jane, 17 January 1632; Jane, 19 June 1633; Marie, 5 August 1638; and Robert, 19 February 1639. The burials of two daughters are also recorded — Jane, 19 February 1631, and Mary, 12 August 1643.

Miles Graye II and his family lived at Saffron Walden for much of the period between 1630 and 1643 when his father Miles Graye I was employing him between the years 1629-1642 as his agent in the counties of Hertfordshire, Bedfordshire and Cambridgeshire. It is recorded that Miles Graye II had a foundry in Saffron Walden as there are records of bells being carried there by cart from St Katherine's church in Ickleford in Hertfordshire in 1637:

First payd to Gray of Saffron Walden, bellfounder, for running and casting fower of the Bells belonging to the Church of Ickleford aforesayd, 13 li.

Item payd to James Jackson for carriage of some of the sayd bells by cart to Saffron Walden and for recarriage of them, 20s. Item for carriage of the other of the sayd bells theither and for recarriage of them by this accomptant's owne carte and horses, 20s.

Item to — Gray for mending a bell clapper, 3s.

Item to a messenger to go to Saffron Walden. 2s 6d.

The foundry was obviously not far from the church as the cost of carrying bells to and from Saffron Walden Church is very low. No bells are recorded as having been cast by Miles Graye II after 1642 and he appears to have left the business at that time, possibly due to the Civil War, although some have argued that he may have had a disagreement with Miles Graye I, possibly over his father's new wife, as he and his sisters received only a shilling each in their father's will. It is believed that Miles II died in 1666.

== Miles Graye III (1628-1686) ==
The third bell-founding Miles Graye, the son of Miles II and Jane, was born at Colchester in 1628 and it was he who carried on the bell-founding business after the death of his grandfather Miles Graye I in 1649. He worked mainly in Cambridgeshire, Bedfordshire, Hertfordshire and Huntingdonshire and continued to cast bells until his death in 1686.

Miles II and Jane also had a son Christopher Graye, born in 1626 and who also became a bell-founder, but he did not work in Colchester or cast any Essex bells. Ann, daughter of Miles Graye I also married a bell-founder, John Darbie, who is known to have cast 161 bells in Suffolk.

== Notable bells cast by Miles Graye ==
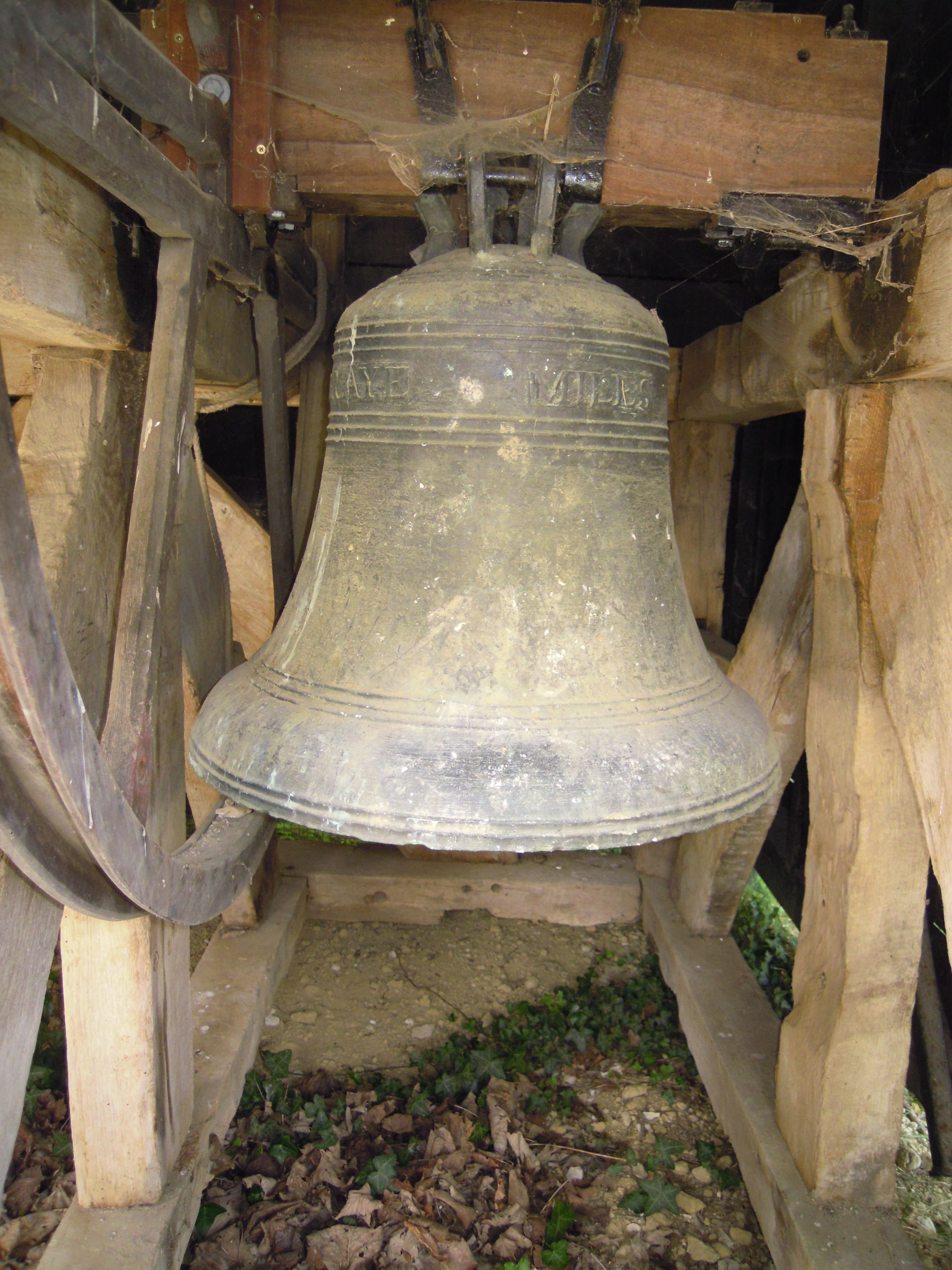
A late 16th-century bell by Miles Graye - formerly at St Mary's church in Stoughton in Sussex but now at the Weald and Downland Living Museum

Due to augmentations and recastings only three complete rings of Miles Graye bells remain they are; the ring of five bells at St Mary Virgin Great Leighs, Essex cast in 1634 by Miles I Graye, the ring of three bells at Hauxton, Cambridgeshire cast in 1666 by Miles III Graye, and the ring of four bells at West Hanningfield, Essex cat in 1676 by Miles III Graye.

However a number of rings exist where Miles Graye cast the majority of the bells including Bramford, Ipswich St Margaret, Broxted, Acton, Bassingbourne, Swaffham, Little Horkesley, and Gestingthorpe.

Bells larger than 42'' in diameter cast by the Miles Graye family
Tower	No. of bell	Weight	Diameter	Cast	Founder
Lavenham, Suffolk, S Peter & S Paul	8 of 8	21-0-7 (1070 kg) in D♭	52.00"	1625	Miles I Graye
Hadleigh, Suffolk, S Mary	8 of 8	22-1-17 (1138 kg) in D	52.00"	1680	Miles III Graye
Stowmarket, Suffolk, S Peter & S Mary	8 of 8	20-0-27 (1028 kg) in D	51.50"	1622	Miles I Graye
Ipswich, Suffolk, S Mary le Tower	Sanctus	21-1-15 (1086 kg) in E♭	51.50"	1610	Miles I Graye
Sible Hedingham, Essex, S Peter	8 of 8	18¼ cwt (~930 kg) in E	48.00"	1616	Miles I Graye
Gamlingay, Cambridgeshire, S Mary V	8 of 8	16-0-14 (819 kg) in E♭	47.00"	1653	Miles III Graye
Swaffham, Norfolk, S Peter & S Paul	8 of 8	15-2-23 (798 kg) in E	46.50"	1634	Miles I Graye
Braughing, Hertfordshire, S Mary V	8 of 8	19 cwt (~970 kg) in E	46.50"	1631	Miles I Graye
Feering, Essex, All Saints	8 of 8	18 cwt (~910 kg) in F	46.00"	1624	Miles I Graye
Felsham, Suffolk, S Peter	6 of 6	15½ cwt (~790 kg) in F	45.00"	1639	Miles II Graye
Little Bentley, Essex, S Mary	5 of 5	15¼ cwt (~770 kg) in F	44.38"	1626	Miles I Graye
Kelvedon, Essex, S Mary V	7 of 8	14-1-3 (725 kg) in F	44.25"	1615	Miles I Graye
Monks Eleigh, Suffolk, S Peter	6 of 6	18 cwt (~910 kg) in E	43.94"	1638	Miles I Graye
Ipswich, Suffolk, S Margaret	8 of 8	14-0-11 (716 kg) in F	43.56"	1630	Miles I Graye
Great Bardfield, Essex, S Mary V	8 of 8	15 cwt (~760 kg) in F♯	43.50"	1602	Miles I Graye
Layer de la Haye, Essex, S John Bapt	6 of 6	10-3-22 (556 kg) in F	43.38"	1622	Miles I Graye
Sudbury, Suffolk, S Peter	9 of 10	14-1-25 (735 kg) in F♯	43.25"	1641	Miles I Graye
Great Hormead, Hertfordshire, S Nicholas	6 of 6	12 cwt (~610 kg) in F♯	43.00"	1623	Miles I Graye
Bassingbourn, Cambridgeshire, S Peter & S Paul	6 of 6	12-0-9 (614 kg) in F♯	42.75"	1650	Miles III Graye
Helions Bumpstead, Essex, S Andrew	8 of 8	12-2-9 (639 kg) in F	42.63"	1641	Miles II Graye
Braughing, Hertfordshire, S Mary V	7 of 8	12¾ cwt (~650 kg) in F♯	42.50"	1653	Miles III Graye
Swaffham, Norfolk, S Peter & S Paul	7 of 8	12-0-10 (614 kg) in F♯	42.25"	1634	Miles I Graye
Feering, Essex, All Saints	7 of 8	12½ cwt (~640 kg) in G	42.00"	1624	Miles I Graye
