= Westmill, Hitchin =

Area of Hitchin, Hertfordshire, England

Coordinates: 51.958°N 0.289°W

Westmill
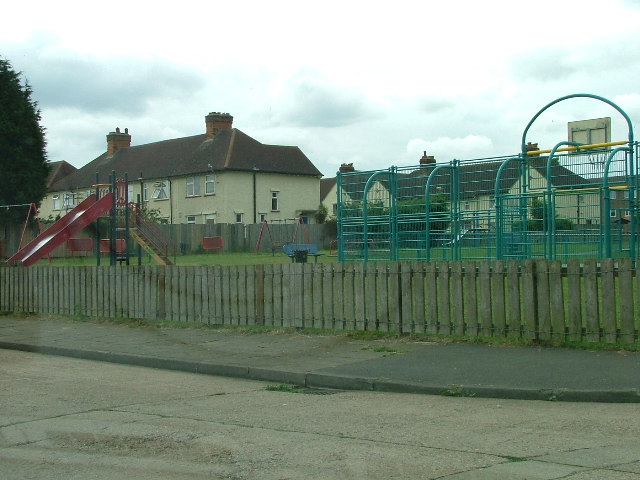

- Location within Hertfordshire
- District: North Hertfordshire
- Shire county: Hertfordshire
- Region: East
- Country: England
- Sovereign state: United Kingdom
- Police: Hertfordshire
- Fire: Hertfordshire
- Ambulance: East of England

Westmill is a residential area of Hitchin, in the North Hertfordshire district, in the county of Hertfordshire, England. It was originally built as a council housing estate in the 1920s. There is a primary school, Oughton Junior, Infant and Nursery School. It forms part of Hitchin Oughton ward for local government purposes.

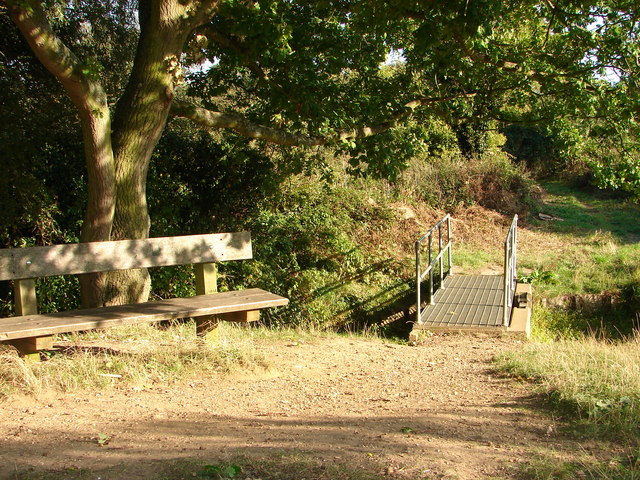
Bridge and seat on Oughtonhead Common.

It is close to the Oughtonhead Common, a Local Nature Reserve, and Oughtonhead Lane, a geological Site of Special Scientific Interest.
