= Church of St Katharine, Ickleford =

Church in Hertfordshire, England

Coordinates: 51.9707°N 0.2801°W

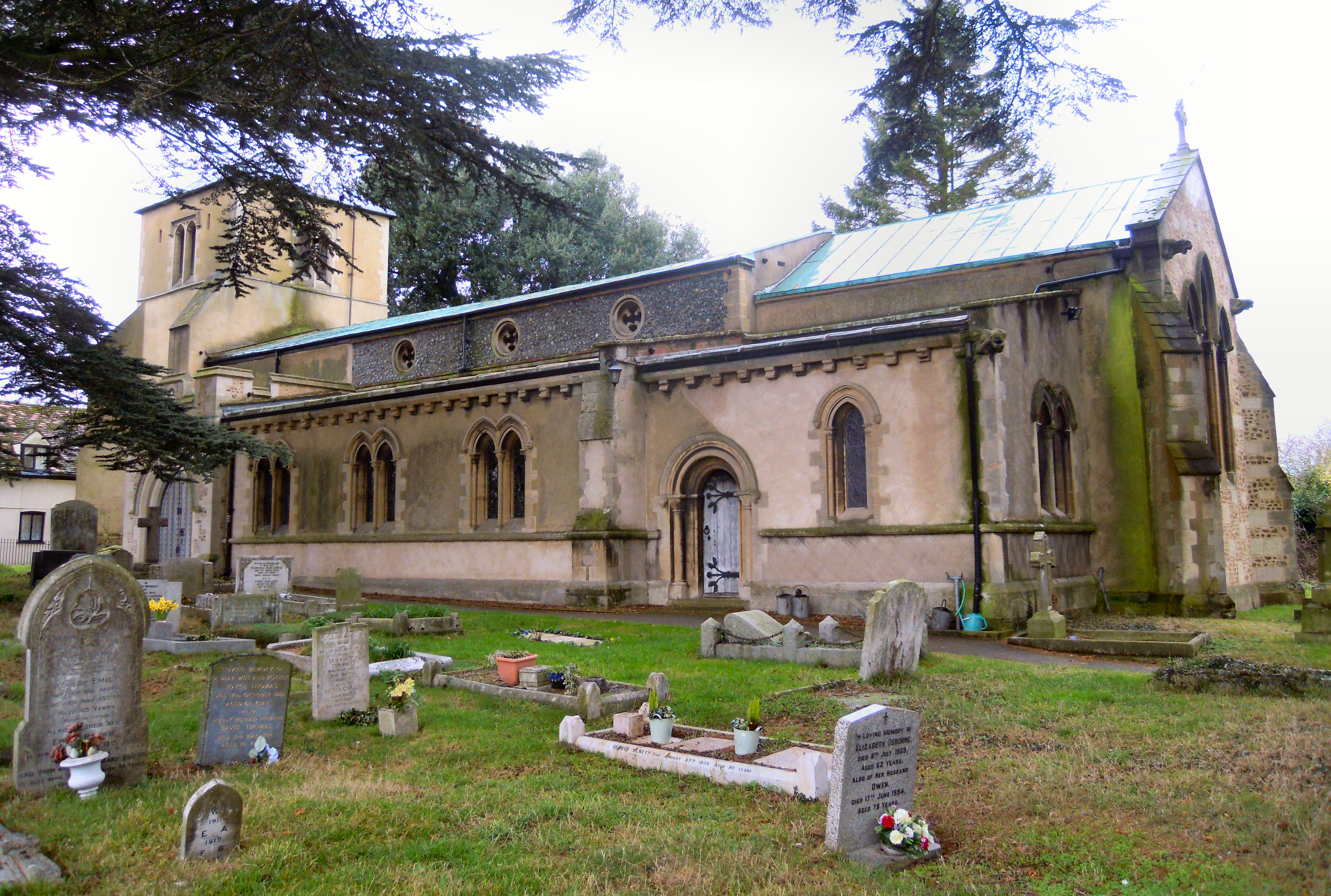
The Church of St Katharine of Alexandria, Ickleford

The Church of St Katharine of Alexandria is the Church of England parish church for Ickleford in Hertfordshire. It comes under the diocese of St Albans.

The building is of medieval origin and is listed Grade I.

== History ==
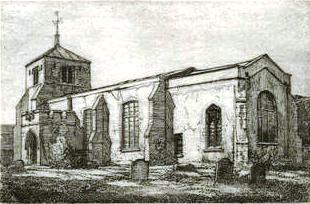
St Katharine's before the alterations of 1859

Ickleford is not mentioned in the Domesday Book probably because it was part of Pirton. The church of Ickleford was originally a chapel to Pirton, and the two livings were held together until divided by order of the Ecclesiastical Commissioners in 1847. The advowson was purchased by Thomas Wilson in 1868. It was conveyed before 1875 to the Rev. T. I. Walton, and then belonged to the Rev. C. A. Walton, his son.

== Design ==
A small church in the centre of Ickleford, the nave dates to the mid 12th-century, while the chancel and West tower are from the early 13th-century. The South porch and nave roof were added in the mid 15th-century. The church underwent a major restoration in 1859 under Sir George Gilbert Scott at which time the South aisle, South chapel (currently in use as the organ chamber) and North vestry were added. The external masonry walls are plastered while the walls of the South clerestory are of uncoursed knapped flint. The chancel has a 13th-century lancet window to the North of the altar, a 15th-century cinquefoil piscina to the South, and stained glass of about 1860 attributed to Clayton and Bell in a medallion and mosaic design.

In the South wall is a wide 19th-century Romanesque arch with interlinked chain motif, while on the North wall there is a large monument to Richard Ansell of 1726 and which is signed by R. Easton. There are funerary hatchments over the North and South doors and an octagonal 19th century arcaded stone pulpit matched by an octagonal stone baptismal font on eight coloured marble shafts, both added during the restoration by Scott. There is a monumental brass of Thomas Somer and his wife Marjory of about 1380 with an imperfect inscription. The church has a stained-glass window of 1898 by Charles Eamer Kempe. In the north wall of the nave are two windows, one on each side of a blocked 12th-century Norman doorway which is damaged and has been repaired with cement, but which has a well-preserved chevron moulding on the rear-arch.

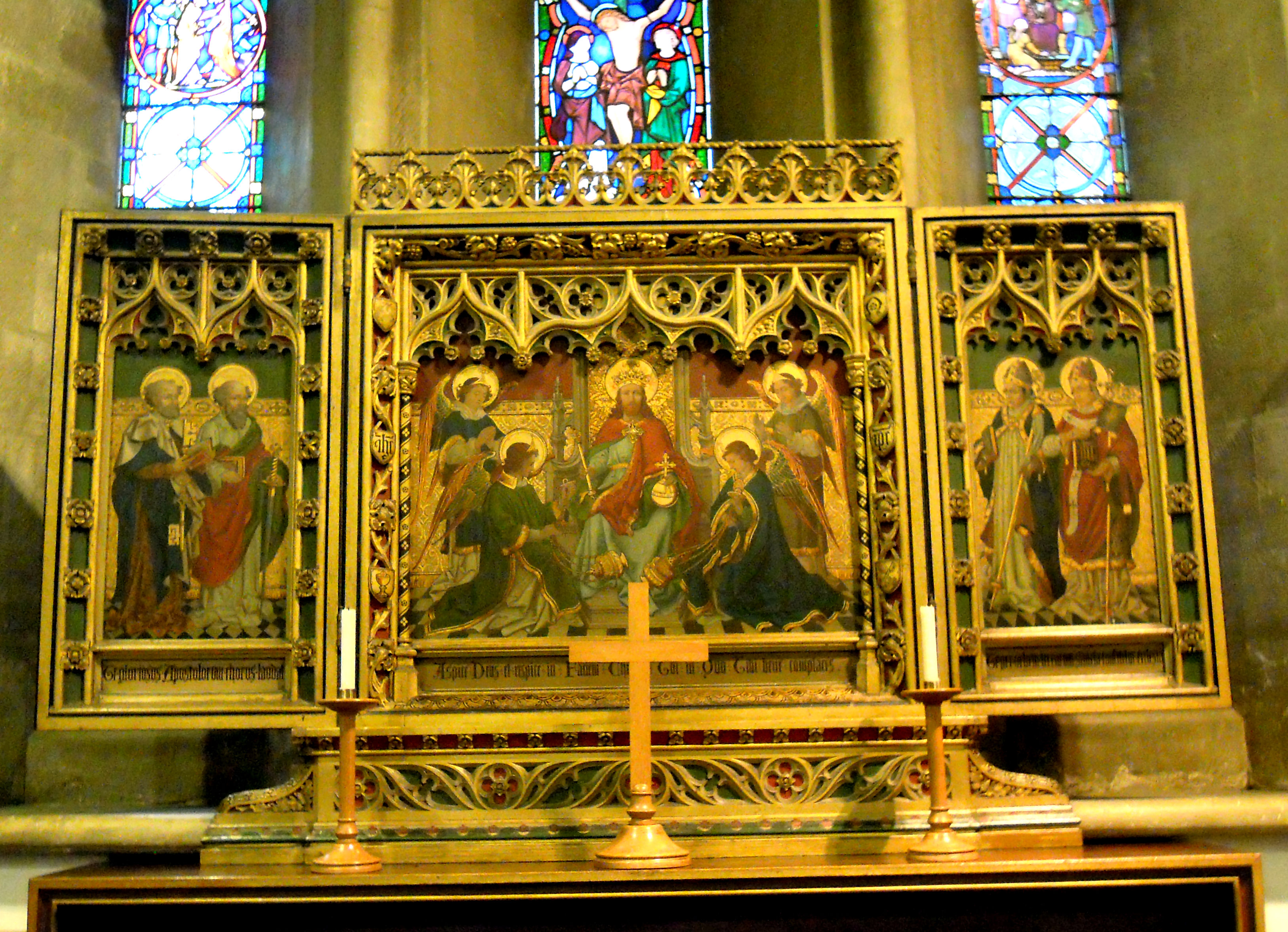
The triptych behind the altar is by Charles Edgar Buckeridge

The West tower is of two stages with heavy buttresses, those at the north-west and south-west angles being diagonal. The low pyramidal roof is of lead. The tower arch, which is two-centred, and a small lancet on the south side, are probably original. The west window and the two-light belfry windows are of the 15th-century and are repaired with cement. There are five bells: the treble and second are by John Warner & Sons, 1857; the third is by Richard Chandler, 1680; the fourth by Miles Graye, 1650; and the fifth by Thomas Russell of Wootton, 1726.

The plate consists of a cup of 1796, presented by Thomas Cockayne in 1807 and a Victorian paten and flagon, the former made from two old silver patens. The high altar is of oak which is panelled and carved. The gilded and painted triptych behind the altar shows the worship of Jesus as the King of Heaven; it is Gothic in design and is by Charles Edgar Buckeridge.

The church is the burial-place of Henry Boswell, "King of the Gypsies", who died in 1760, at the advanced age of 90; the remains of his wife and granddaughter are likewise interred here.

The church has been listed by English Heritage as a Grade I listed building since 1968.

== Gallery ==
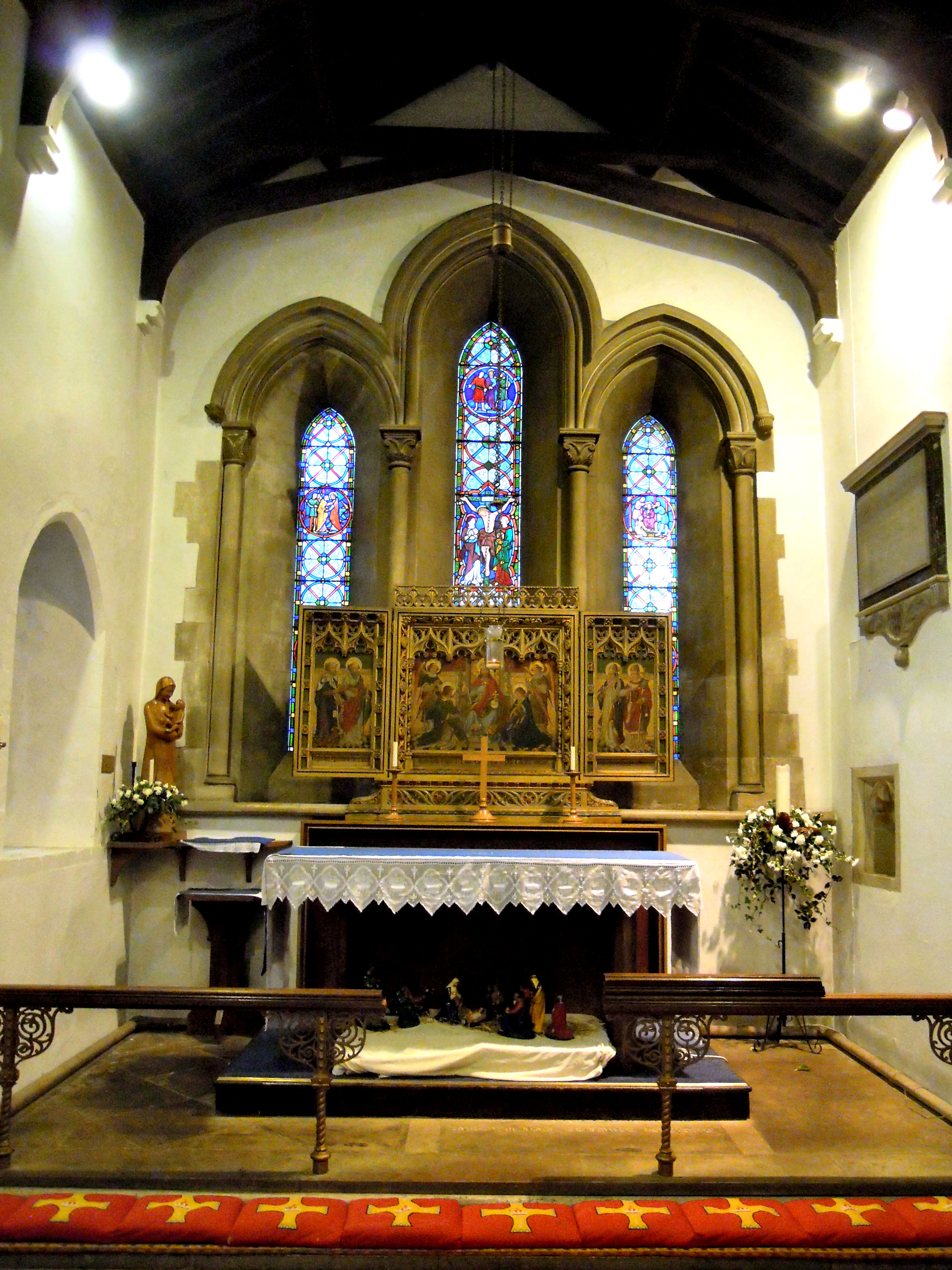
The chancel

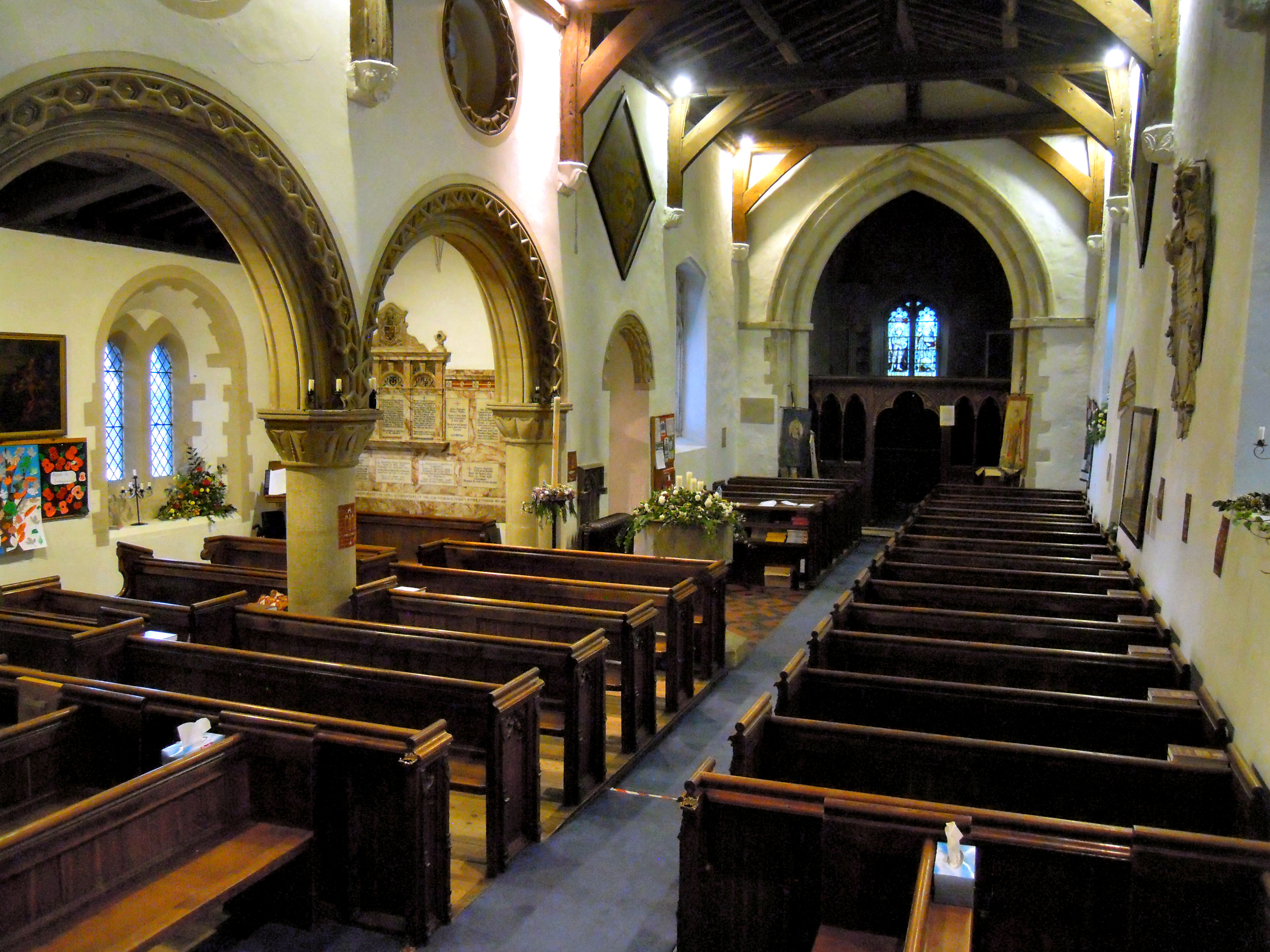
Looking down the nave from the east

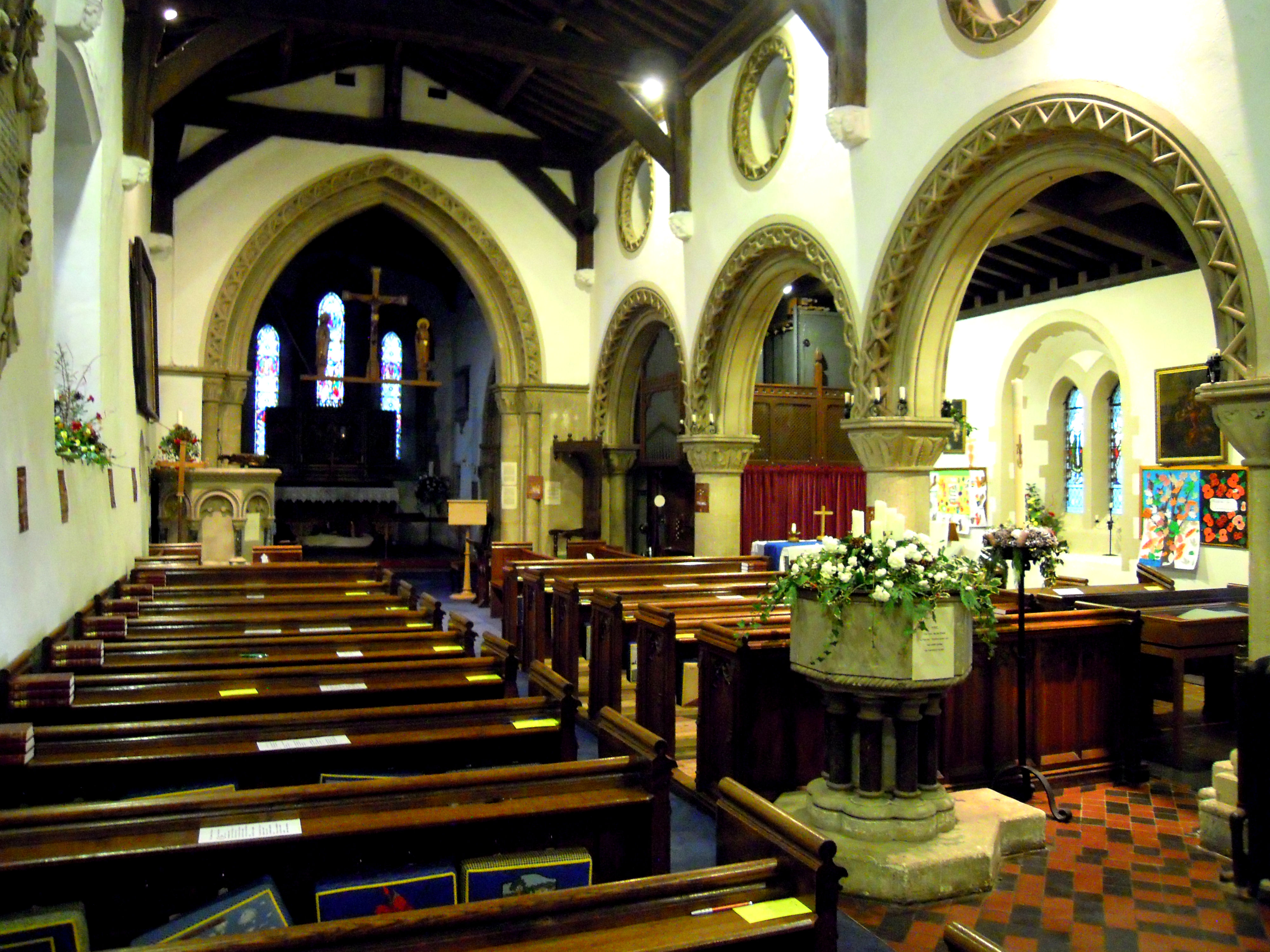
Looking up the nave from the west

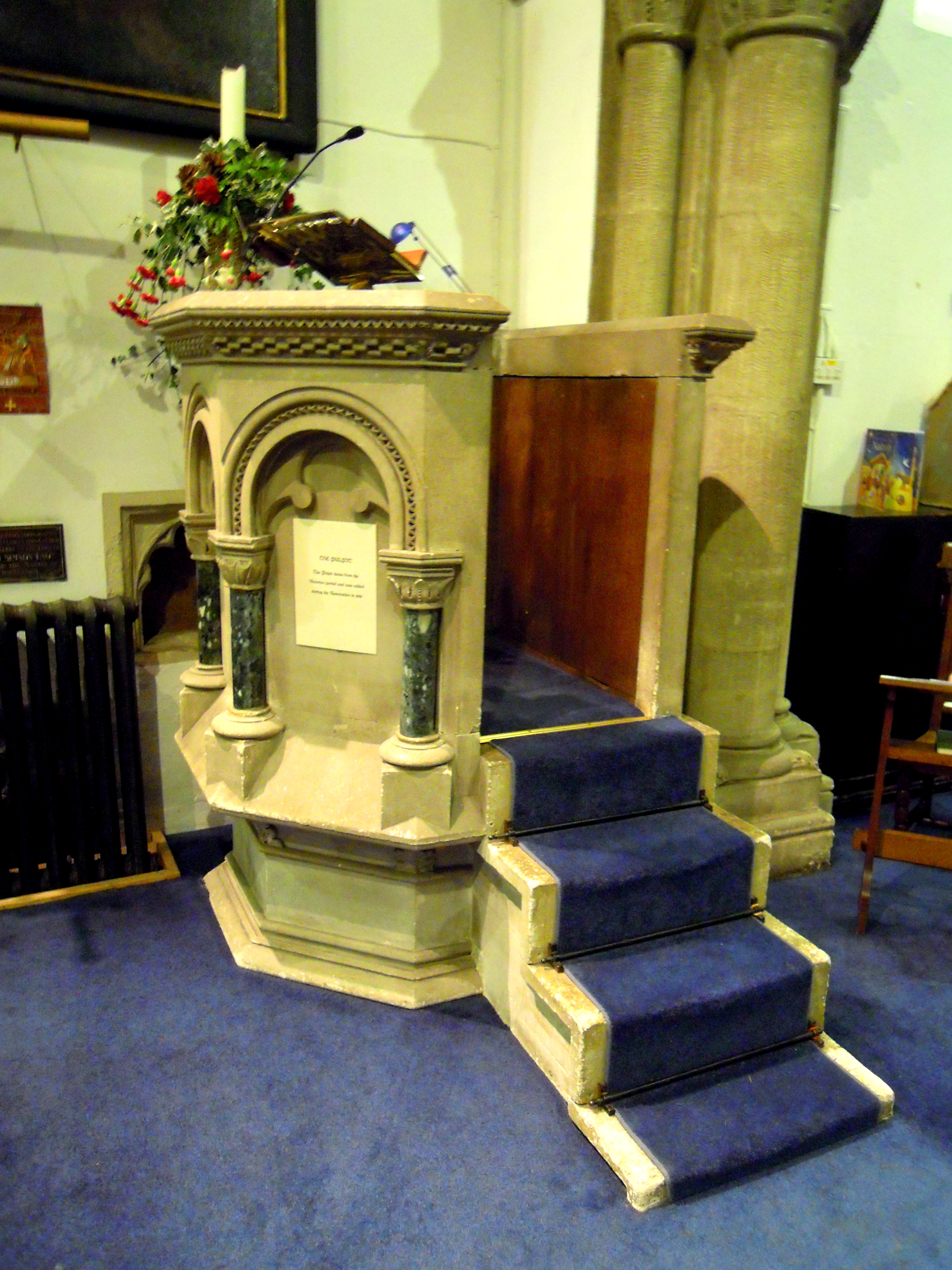
The pulpit dates to 1859

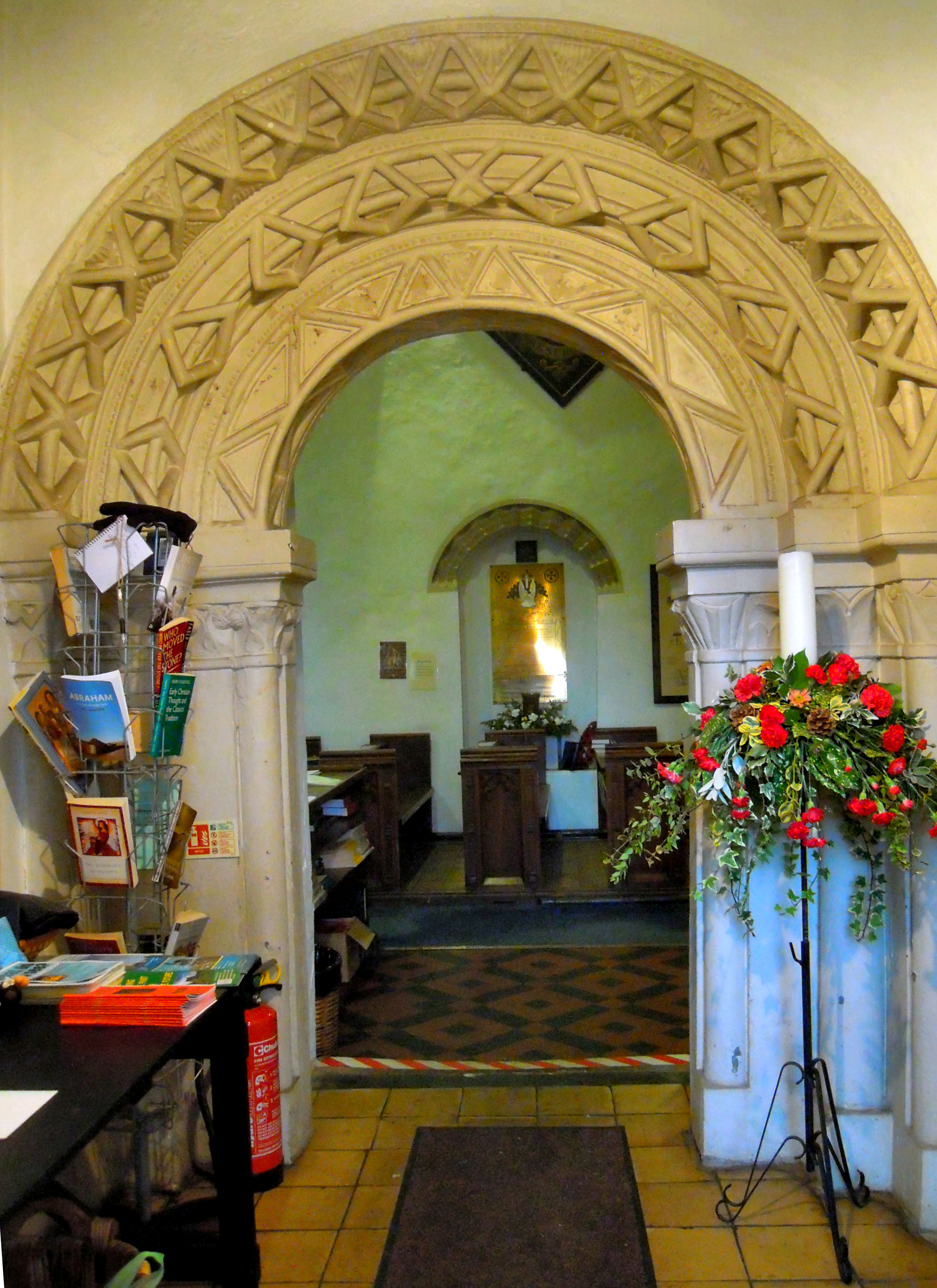
The Romanesque doorway was added in 1859
