= Jack o' Legs =

Legendary giant from Hertfordshire, England

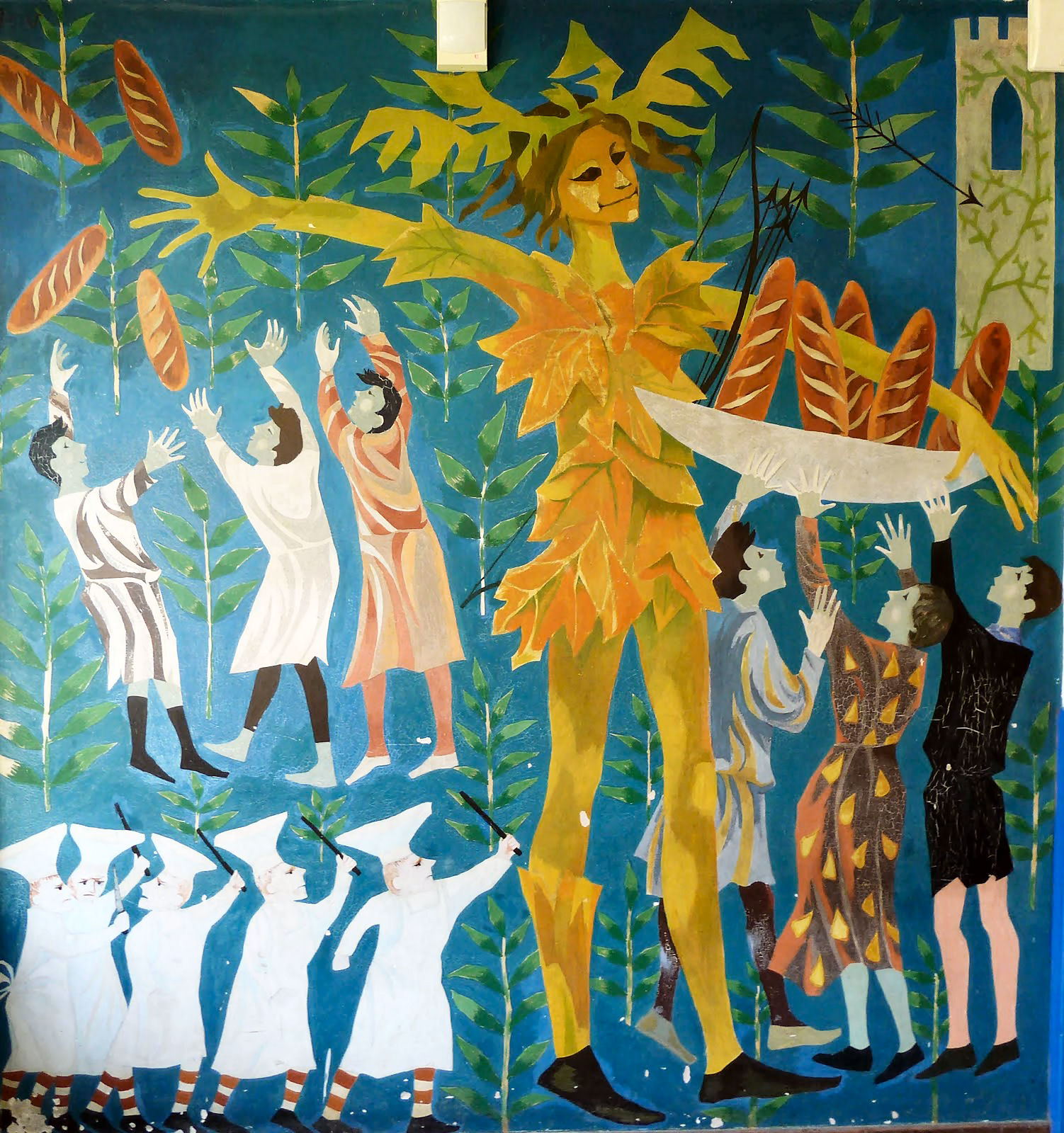
Mural depicting the Legend of Jack o' Legs in Grange Junior School in Letchworth in Hertfordshire

In folklore, Jack o' Legs (also spelled Jack O'Legs) is a giant from Hertfordshire, England. Jack is said to have been an archer who, like Robin Hood, robbed the rich to give to the poor. His supposed grave is in the churchyard of Holy Trinity Church, Weston.

== Legend ==
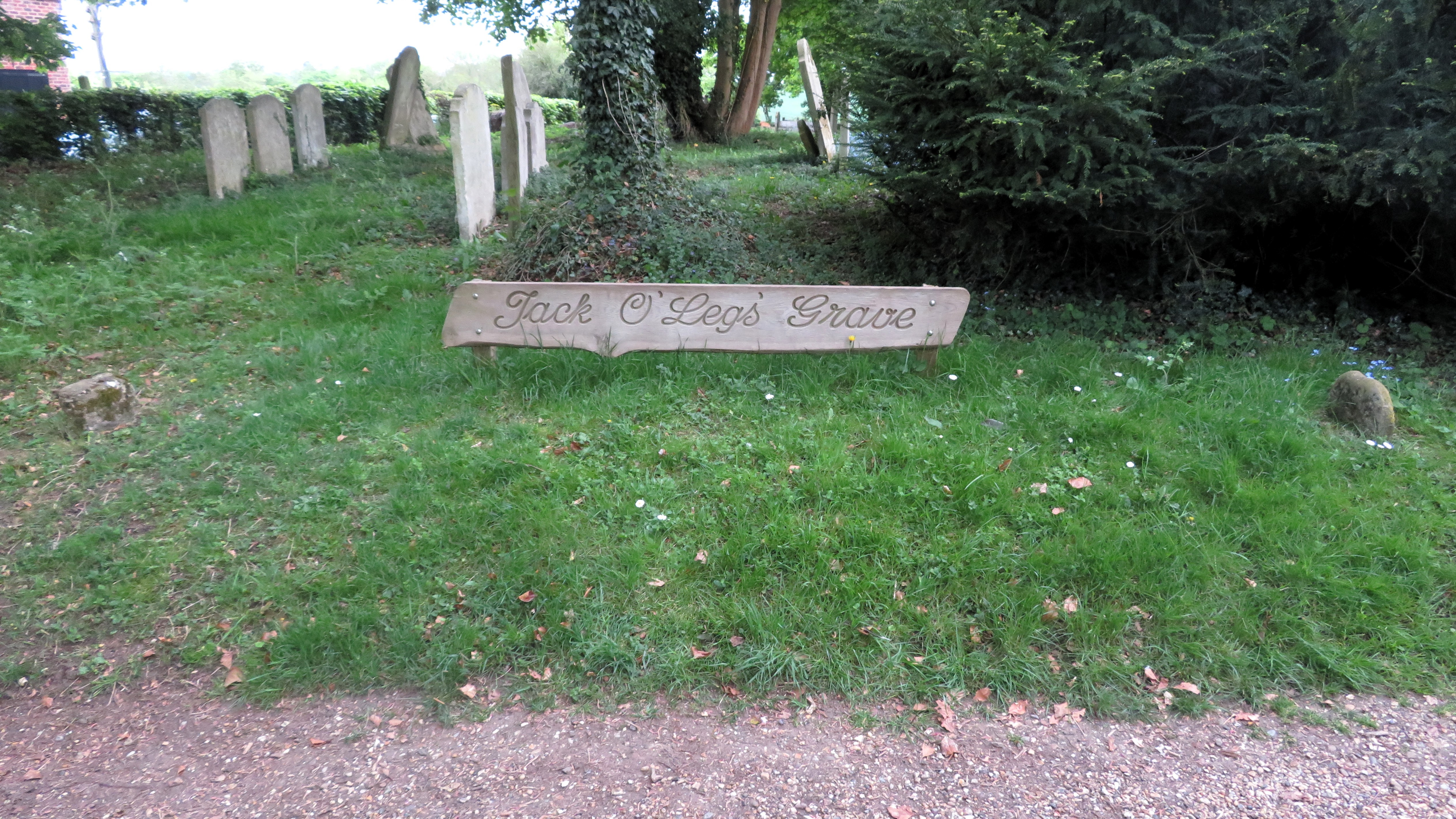
The Grave of Jack o' Legs in the churchyard of Holy Trinity Church, Weston

According to local legend, Jack lived in a cave in a wood at Weston near the medieval town of Baldock. When one year there was a poor harvest the Baldock bakers raised the price of flour, so Jack ambushed the bakers on the road to Graveley and gave the flour to his friends in Weston. In some versions of the story he also overturned the bakers' market stalls in Baldock. In revenge, the bakers caught and blinded him. They gave him a final wish before he was to be hanged. Jack asked to be pointed in the direction of Weston, so he could shoot an arrow with his bow. Where the arrow landed, he wished to be buried. The bakers gave him his huge bow which nobody else could pull. He shot his arrow three miles, into the churchyard of Holy Trinity Church, Weston, which is where he was buried.

== Basis ==
Jack has many similarities to Jack in the Green or the Green Man, a popular figure from English folklore derived from pre-Christian fertility cults. He preferred living in caves and woodland and had a disregard for authority. There are also similarities to the woses or wildmen carved inside many English churches, but unusually in this instance Jack is the hero rather than a sidekick similar to Little John.

The representation of the Bakers of Baldock may be a satire on the Knights Templar who founded the town. This monastic order would have been able to dictate bread prices because they owned the banks, the surrounding farmland, the flour mills, and the marketplace. They also had the power to punish thieves and outlaws.

== History ==
A polemical poem attacking Cardinal Wolsey, Speak Parrot, by John Skelton, written c. 1521, mentions that "The gibbett of Baldock was made for Jack Leg". Baldock was founded c. 1148, so the legend dates from after that time. The practice described in the legend of capturing and locally executing a person caught in the act of stealing, called infangthief, is early mediaeval. Nathanael Salmon recorded the legend in his 1728 History of Hertfordshire.

== Legacy ==
Two stones, supposed to be 14 feet (4.3 m) apart, mark the head and foot of Jack's grave. The field on the site of Jack's cave is called 'The Cave' and the neighbouring field is called 'Weston Wood'. A steep incline on the Great North Road near Graveley is called "Jack’s Hill". There is a Jack o' Legs storyboard sign on Weston village green.

Jack is a popular namesake for strong ales produced in Hertfordshire. Tring Brewery and Six Hills Brewery brew an ale named after Jack o' Legs.
