= Hitchin Oughton =

Coordinates: 51.958°N 0.289°W

Hitchin Oughton is one of the five Hitchin electoral wards of North Hertfordshire District, England. It contains the Westmill estate and is named after the River Oughton. It invariably returns a Labour councillor.
