= Oughtonhead Common =

Local Nature Reserve in Hitchin

Coordinates: 51.9607°N 0.3015°W

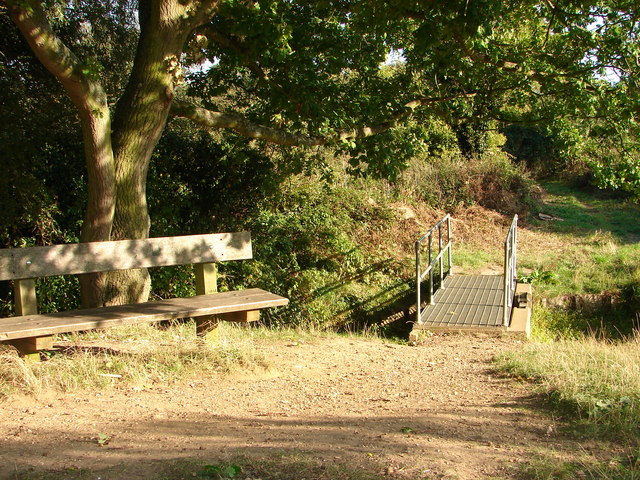

Oughtonhead Common is a 17.4 hectare Local Nature Reserve in the Westmill district of Hitchin, Hertfordshire. It is owned and managed by North Hertfordshire District Council. and home to the Oughtonhead Common nature reserve.

The River Oughton flows along the edge of the site with the Common lying on its floodplain. A layer of sedge and wood peat up to a metre thick underlies the floodplain. The Common supports a wide variety of wildlife habitats. It is grazed by English Longhorn cattle, and there is a football pitch. The Friends of Oughtonhead Common assist with maintaining the site. It is part of the Chilterns Area of Outstanding Natural Beauty. In 2022, Oughtonhead Common was awarded a Green Flag for the seventh consecutive year.

== Oughtonhead Nature Reserve (Wildlife Trust) ==
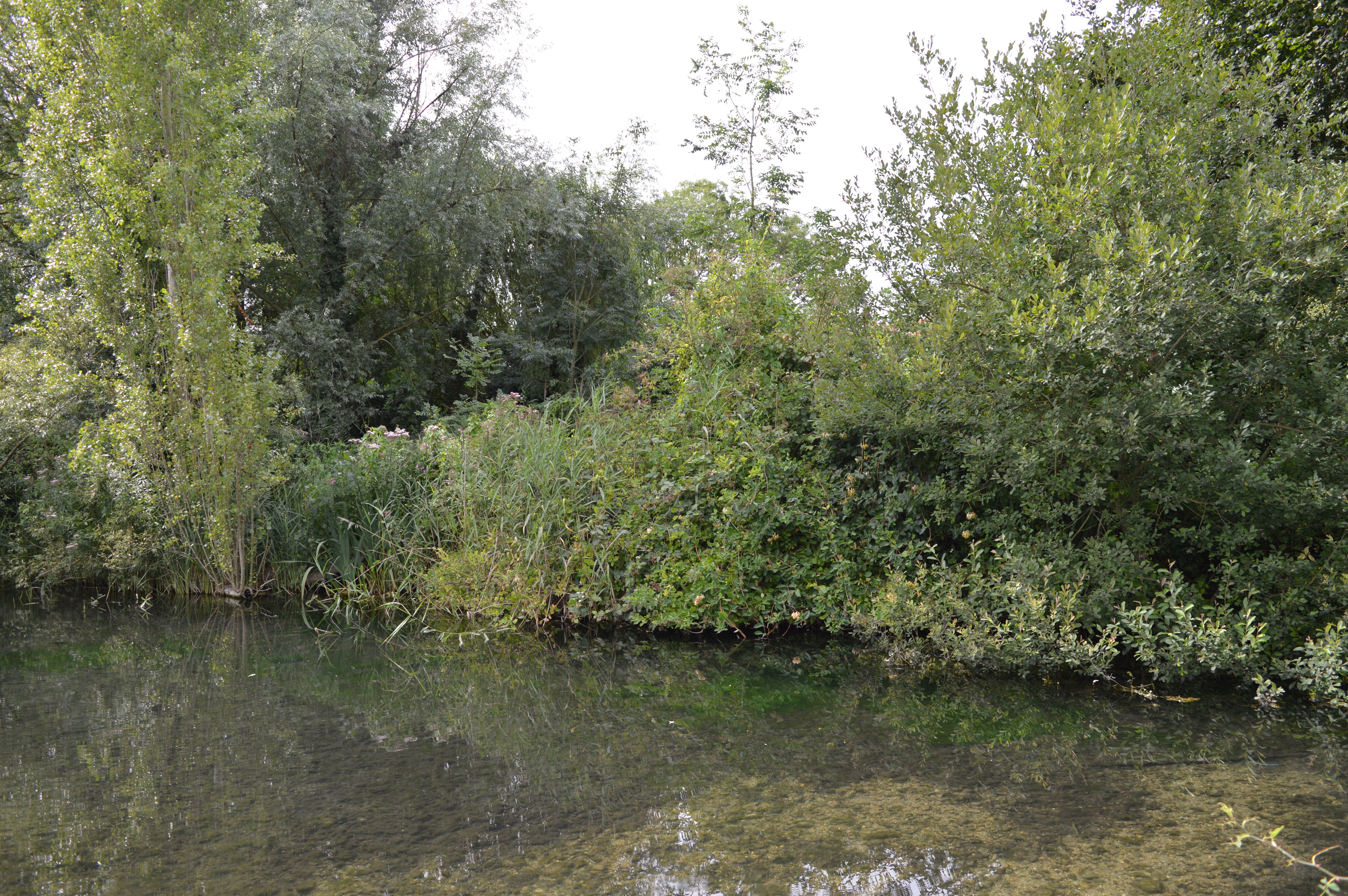
View of the River Oughton and Oughtonhead Nature Reserve from Oughtonhead Common

On the other side of the River Oughton from the Common is the Herts and Middlesex Wildlife Trust's Oughtonhead Nature Reserve. The reserve was established in 1982 and comprises 6.2 hectares (15 acres) of fen woodland. It is not publicly accessible, but can be viewed across the river from the Common.

The site has a variety of habitats, including wet and dry woodland, the river margin and fen areas. Willow, reed and rush were formerly grown and harvested in the wetter areas, and there was a corn mill at the eastern end. Birds include kingfishers, water rails and woodcock, and there are mammals such as water shrews.
