= Ickleford =

Village in Hertfordshire, England

Coordinates: 51.97036°N 0.28368°W

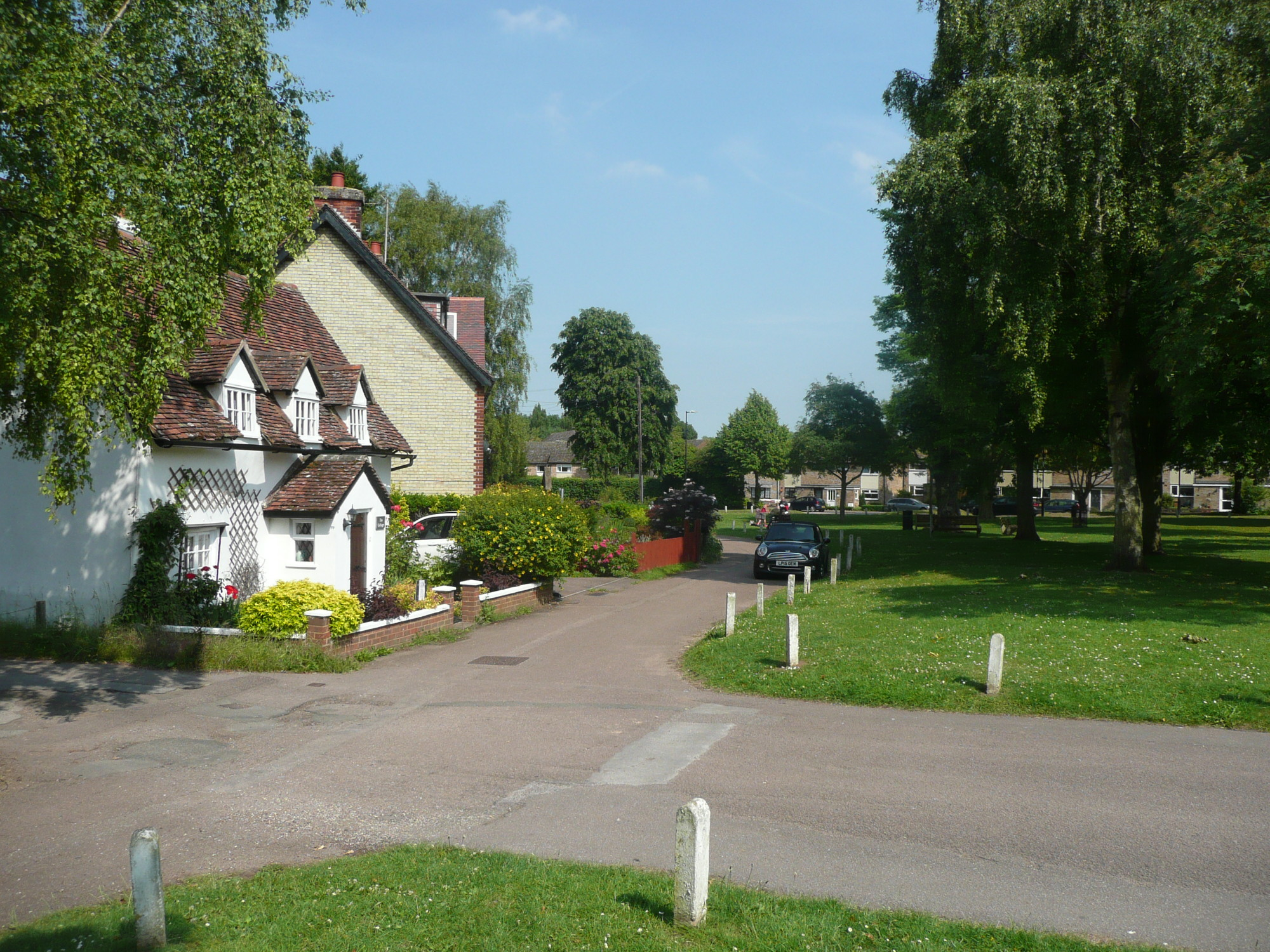
- Upper Green, Ickleford

- Location within Hertfordshire
- Population: 1,936 (Parish, 2021)
- OS grid reference: TL180316
- District: North Hertfordshire
- Shire county: Hertfordshire
- Region: East
- Country: England
- Sovereign state: United Kingdom
- Post town: Hitchin
- Postcode district: SG5
- Dialling code: 01462
- Police: Hertfordshire
- Fire: Hertfordshire
- Ambulance: East of England
- UK Parliament: Hitchin

Ickleford is a village and civil parish in the North Hertfordshire district of Hertfordshire, England. It lies immediately north of the town of Hitchin, from which it is separated by the River Oughton. It lies west of the River Hiz and to the east of the A600 road. The village has two greens: Upper Green by the parish church of St Katharine at the centre of the village, and the larger Lower Green to the north. The population of the parish was 1,936 at the 2021 census.

== Etymology ==
Its name is derived from it being a ford, that is a way to cross a river, along the Icknield Way. Another village, Ickford in Buckinghamshire, shares the same etymology.

== Notable buildings ==
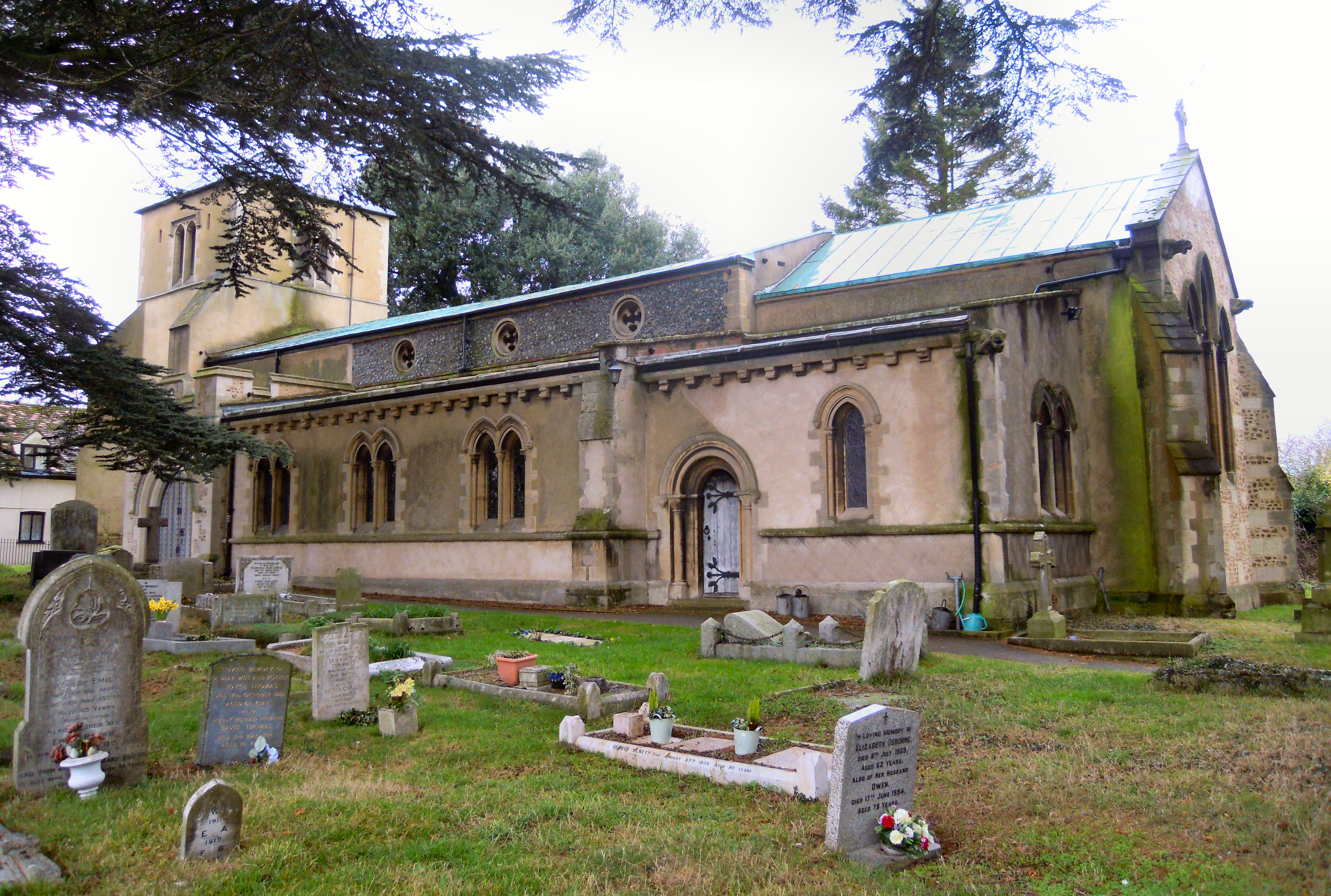
St Katharine's Church

St Katharine's Church, set amid cedar trees, has a 12th-century Norman nave and blocked north doorway with beautifully carved zigzag arches, and a south aisle and chapel added by Sir Giles Gilbert Scott in 1859. The east window has some fine stained glass of 1860. It is the burial-place of Henry Boswell, "King of the Gypsies", who died in 1760, at the advanced age of 90; the remains of his wife and granddaughter are likewise interred here.

== Governance ==
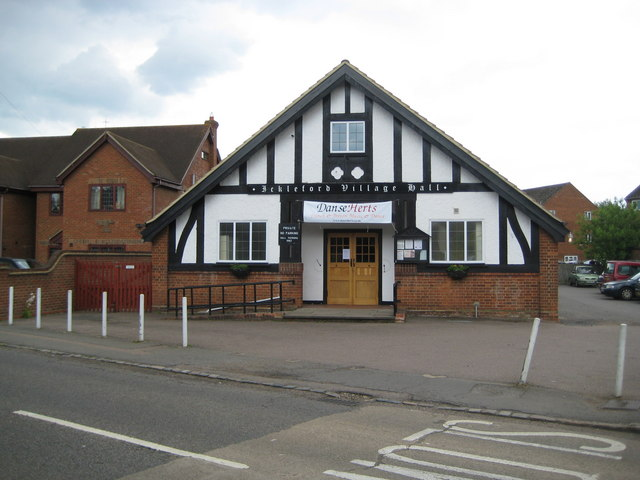
Ickleford Village Hall

There are three tiers of local government covering Ickleford, at parish, district, and county level: Ickleford Parish Council, North Hertfordshire District Council, and Hertfordshire County Council. The parish council meets at the village hall on Arlesey Road.

Ickleford historically formed part of the ancient parish of Pirton. St Katharine's Church at Ickleford dates back to the 12th century, but it remained a chapel of ease to St Mary's at Pirton until Ickleford was made a separate parish in 1847.

The modern parish of Ickleford includes areas that were historically detached parts of Shillington and Holwell, both of which were in Bedfordshire. The Shillington exclave was transferred to Hertfordshire by the Counties (Detached Parts) Act 1844 and became part of Ickleford parish in 1897. The whole parish of Holwell was transferred to Hertfordshire in 1897; its exclave at Cadwell became part of Ickleford parish in 1985.

== Transport ==
The Icknield Way Path passes through the village on its 110-mile journey from Ivinghoe Beacon in Buckinghamshire to Knettishall Heath in Suffolk. The Icknield Way Trail, a multi-user route for walkers, horse riders and off-road cyclists also passes through the village. The Bedford to Hitchin Line used to pass through the village, remnants of which can still be seen in places such as Gerry's Hole where parts of the old bridge and embankment are still present. The local Parish Council attempted to raise public awareness of the village through its Parish Plan in 2006–07.

== Facilities ==
Ickleford has a primary school (Ickleford Primary School), village hall, general store and a unisex hairdresser

There are two public houses: The Old George and The Plume of Feathers.

The large sports and recreation ground also contains a playground and a licensed bar. The Sports and Recreation Ground caters for several sports, including cricket, football, squash and pétanque, and is home to the Ickleford Cricket Club, whose symbol represents two crossed farmers pitchforks. The club was founded in 1947 and in 2006 won promotion to Division 3 of the Saracens Herts League, and was promoted to Division 2 in 2010. Since 2006, the cricket club's first team has used the nickname "The Tigers". Outside the Recreation Ground towards the school there is a newly built cemetery.

Ickleford also has a Scout troop (the 1st Ickleford (9th Hitchin)) with active sections of Beavers, Cubs and Scouts for both boys and girls.

== Population ==
At the 2021 census, the population of the parish was 1,936. The population had been 1,833 in 2011.
