= River Oughton =

River in Hertfordshire, England

Coordinates: 51°58′08″N 0°16′33″W

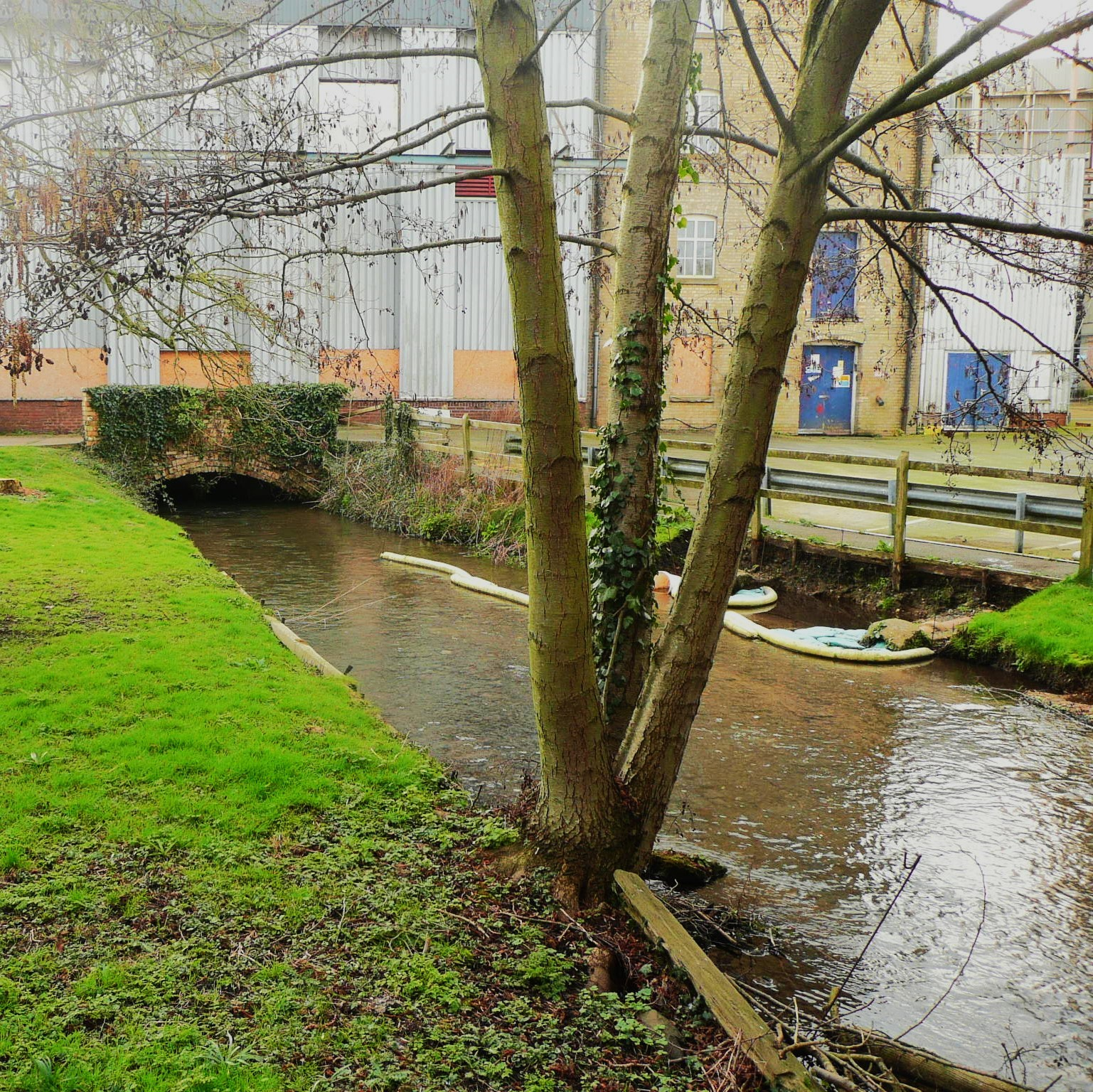
- The river at Ickleford

Physical characteristics
- Source
  - location: Oughtonhead
- Mouth
  - location: River Hiz
- Length: 2 mi (3.2 km)

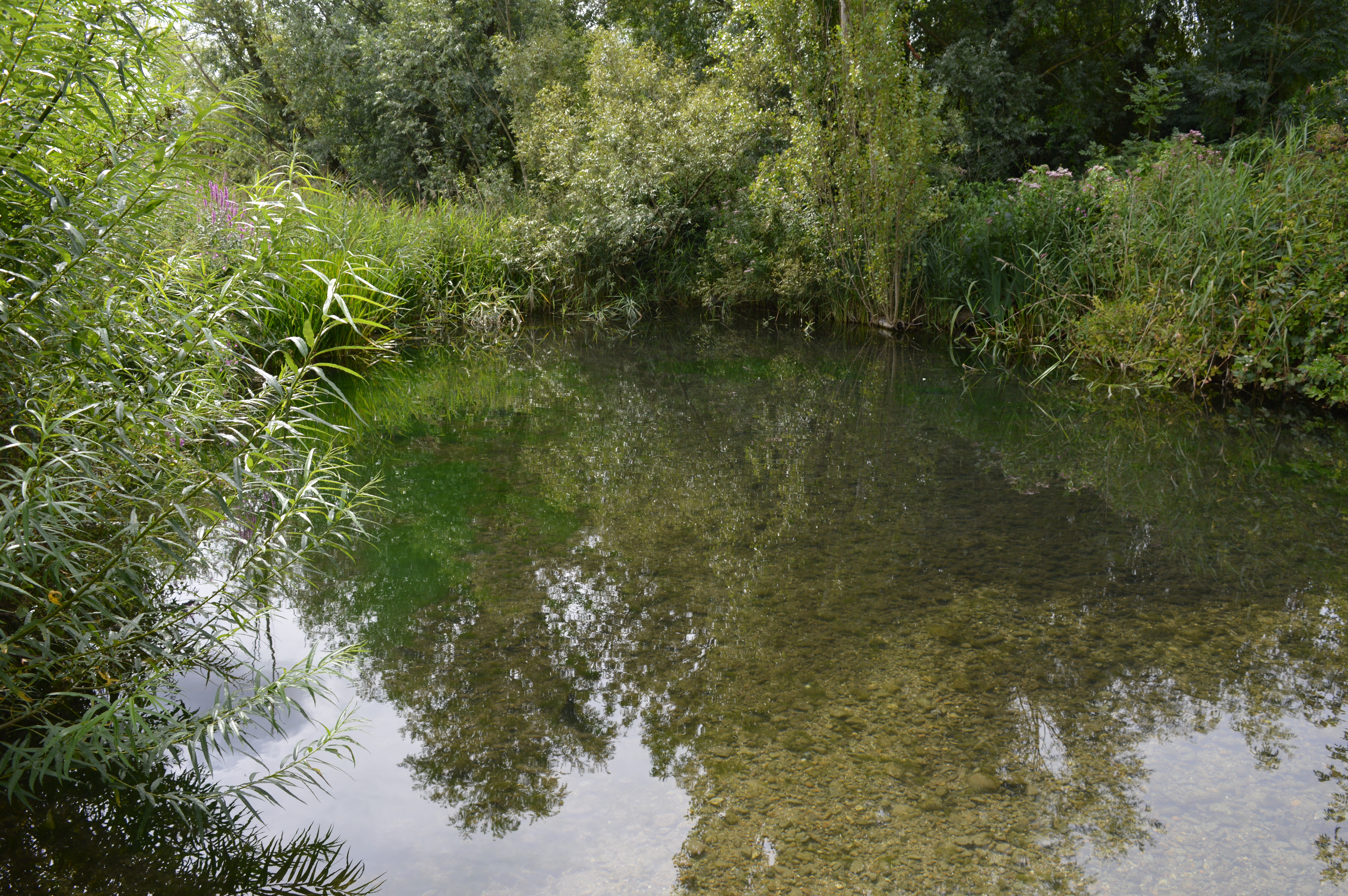
The River Oughton between Oughtonhead Common and Oughtonhead Nature Reserve

The River Oughton is a chalk stream and a two mile long tributary of the River Hiz in North Hertfordshire, England. It rises at Oughtonhead and flows north-east between Oughtonhead Common and Oughtonhead Nature Reserve. The river part defines the boundary of Hitchin with the parishes of Ickleford and Pirton.

== Natural History ==
The river has clear water from chalk springs in the Chiltern Hills, and it has a rich aquatic and insect life. Plants include spring water crowfoot, and there are mammals such as the water shrew, and birds include kingfishers and water rails. Fly fishing author, Richard Walker stated the Oughton held a copious amount of brown trout from the mid-1920s to the mid-1950s, and described the river running from its source through "swampy ground full of reeds and tussocks" to a watermill, whereafter its character altered from "slow and deep" over marl to a "faster, shallower" flow over yellow gravel.

== History ==
An Ordnance Survey map revised to 1897 shows the Oughton formed part of the boundary of Hitchin Urban District and marks three mills alongside the river, namely, West Mill, (destroyed by fire in 1960 after operating for over 300 years) Ickleford Roller Mills, and at the confluence with the River Hiz, Hyde Mill. Originally powered by the Oughton, Ickleford Mill was converted to a steam-powered roller mill in 1892 and the roller mill building was later incorporated into a larger milling facility. The mill remained in production until 2016. An oil spillage believed by the Environment Agency to originate from the disused mill polluted the river in 2023.
