= Welsh Wig =

Knitted woollen cap

- Type: Cap
- Material: Wool
- Place of origin: Wales, United Kingdom

The Welsh Wig or Welch Wig was a knitted woollen cap popular in the 19th century. A simple round cap, the Welsh Wig had a distinctive long back of soft wool to keep the neck warm, which often approximated the appearance of long curly hair.

== History ==
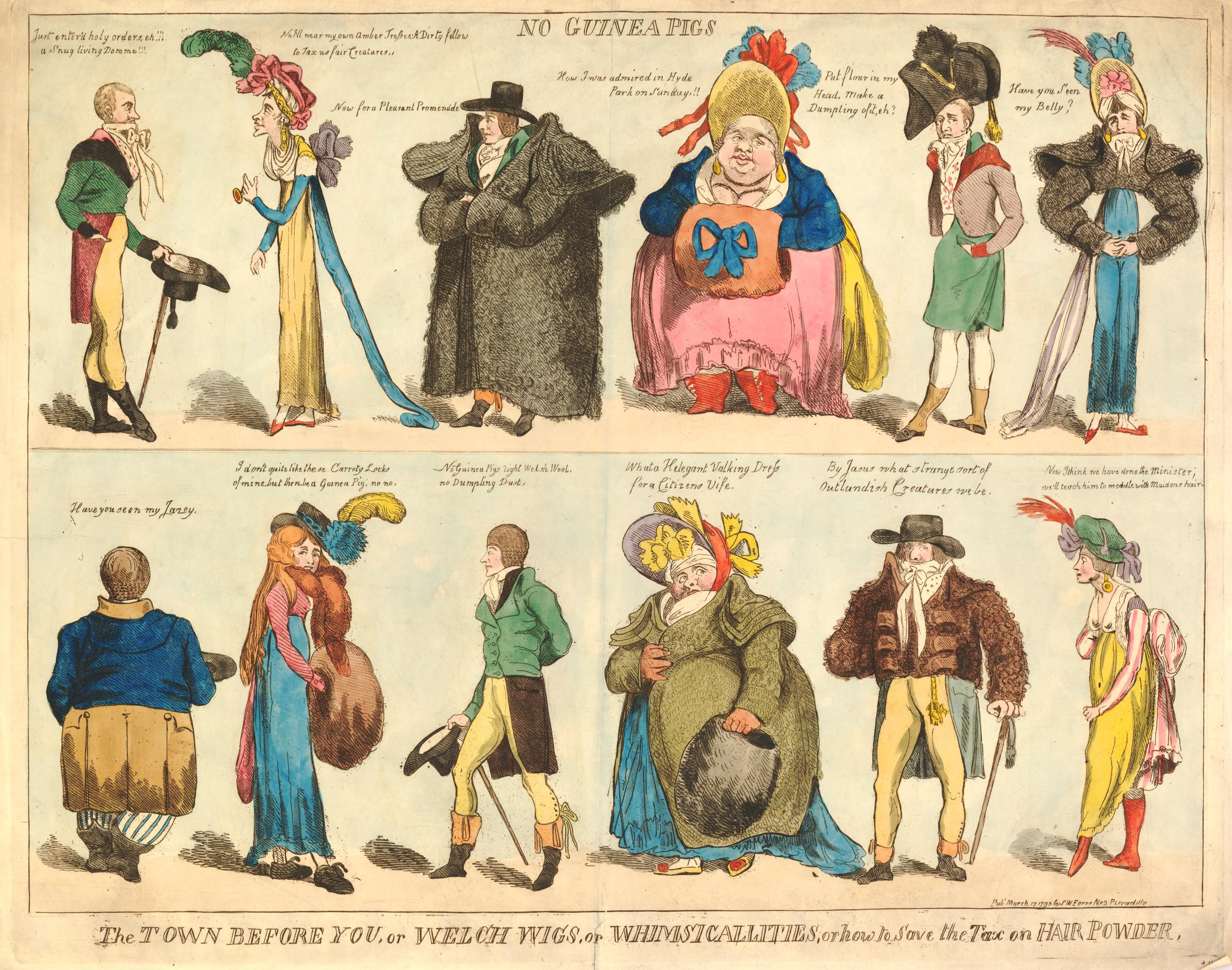
Etching of fashionable British figures from 1795, the third figure on the bottom row is wearing a Welsh Wig.

The wool industry was an important part of the Welsh economy throughout its history. During the fifteenth and sixteenth centuries areas like Monmouthshire and Glamorgan were famous for quality wool, and Wales gained an international renown for high quality woollen products such as caps. This reputation saw a vast increase in trade and exports with Welsh woollen goods found across the markets of Northern Europe.

The continued demand for Welsh goods during this era would allow the industry to become semi-industrialised. These new production processes would in turn lead to a greater variety of goods, especially new woollen caps such as the iconic Monmouth Cap (an obvious progenitor to the Welsh Wig). By the eighteenth century, Welsh wigs were a well known product throughout Great Britain. However, the Welsh woollen industry was in sharp decline in the early nineteenth century. The early industrial processes in Wales had been superseded by the new woollen mills of Northern England, whose cheaper products now dominated the British market. The Napoleonic Era also saw the foreign markets (on which Welsh Wool depended) face specific issues arising from the Continental System and the Post-Napoleonic depression.

The decline was reversed when the new industrial populations of Wales created a market for the specific woollen goods of working life in the nineteenth century. The Welsh Wig, the Crys Fach (a short fronted metallurgical workers shirt), coal miners underpants, shawls, bedgowns and the newly popular Traditional Welsh costume, all maintained and grew the Welsh wool industry.

== Popularity ==
The Welsh Wig was prized by workers for its excellent protection against the elements, providing a shield against the wind on the back of the neck. As the fashion for traditional wigs declined, there was now a market for more practical knitted headwear and Welsh wigs soon developed a reputation as a hardy and utilitarian product. It became a common accessory throughout the British Empire, not only associated with industrial workers but also with stagecoach travelers, mountaineers and polar explorers. By the 1850s a Welsh wig was seen by the British as so ubiquitous, that it was part of the "kit list" for men fighting in the Crimean War.

In Charles Dickens' A Christmas Carol the character Mr Fezziwig is described as wearing A Welsh Wig, with his name deriving from the garment.

== See also ==
- Monmouth cap
- Mr Fezziwig
- Woollen industry in Wales
