= Ian McNeice =

English actor (born 1950)

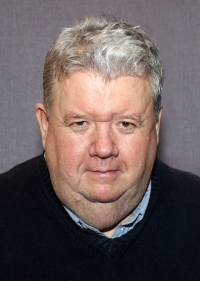
- McNeice in 2009
- Born: 2 October 1950 (age 75); Basingstoke, Hampshire, England
- Occupation: Actor
- Years active: 1977–present
- Television: B&B (1992); Doc Martin (2004–2022); Rome (2005–2007); Doctor Who (2010–2011)
- Spouse: Katie Nicholls (separated)
- Children: 3

Ian McNeice (born 2 October 1950) is an English film and television actor. On television, he has played government agent Harcourt in the 1985 television series Edge of Darkness, Bert Large in the comedy-drama Doc Martin, the Newsreader in historical drama Rome (2005–2007) and Winston Churchill in Doctor Who (2010–2011). He has also appeared in films including The Englishman Who Went up a Hill but Came down a Mountain, Ace Ventura: When Nature Calls and Frank Herbert's Dune.

== Early life and education ==
McNeice was born in Basingstoke, Hampshire. His acting training started at the Taunton School in Somerset, followed by the London Academy of Music and Dramatic Art (LAMDA) and two years at the Salisbury Playhouse. The next few years were spent in theatre, including a four-year period with the Royal Shakespeare Company and a production of Nicholas Nickleby on Broadway.

== Career ==
McNeice's television breakthrough was as Harcourt in the award-winning series Edge of Darkness. He played the alcoholic sous chef Gustave LaRoche on the television series Chef!, and went on to appear in the 2000 miniseries Frank Herbert's Dune as the evil Baron Vladimir Harkonnen, a role he later reprised for the 2003 sequel Children of Dune. His television appearances have included all ten series of Doc Martin, in which he plays Bert Large, series 4 episode 4 of Midsomer Murders, and the third episode of the second series of Lewis. He appears as the Newsreader in the HBO/BBC production Rome and as Mr. Tapling of the British diplomatic service in Hornblower- The Examination for Lieutenant.

McNeice has also appeared in a number of films, including 84 Charing Cross Road, Day of the Dead, No Escape, From Hell and The Englishman Who Went Up a Hill But Came Down a Mountain. His breakthrough into American films occurred when he played Fulton Greenwall in Ace Ventura: When Nature Calls (1995). He played the Nazi Gerhard Klopfer in the 2001 BBC/HBO television film Conspiracy.

Since then, he has been in Around the World in 80 Days (2004) and the 2005 supernatural thriller White Noise. He also appeared as Potiphar in Joseph and the Amazing Technicolor Dreamcoat.

McNeice gave his distinctive voice and accent to voice-acting roles like the Vogon character Kwaltz, director of the Vogon Constructor Fleet, in the 2005 film adaptation of Douglas Adams' The Hitchhiker's Guide to the Galaxy. In 2007, he made his Doctor Who debut when he guest-starred as villain Zeus in the Big Finish BBC Digital Radio 7 drama Immortal Beloved. He had a cameo role as Joachim von Kortzfleisch, a German general who refused to put his troops under the command of officers plotting to depose Hitler's government, in Valkyrie.

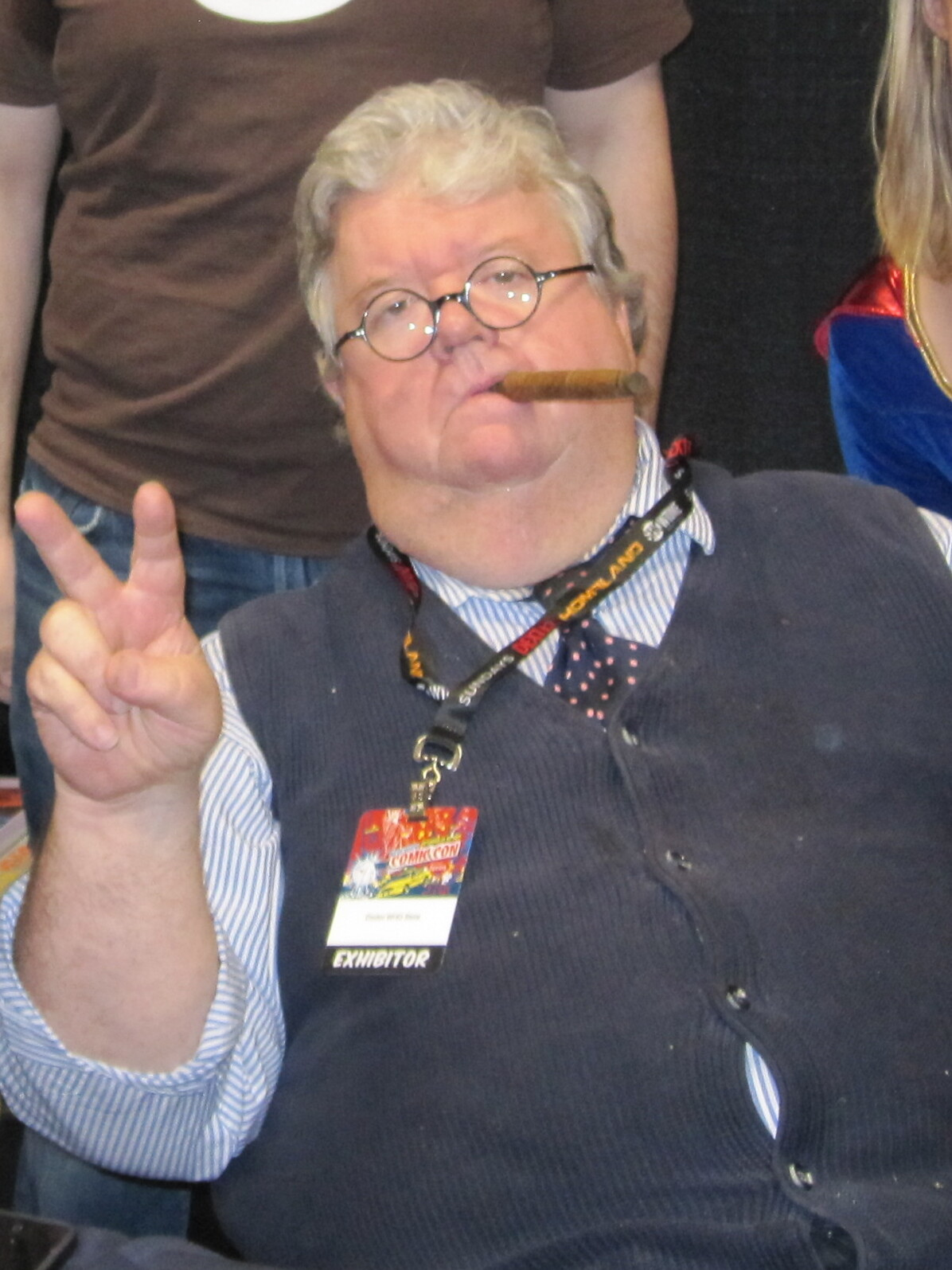
McNeice in 2011

McNeice was initially cast in the role of Illyrio Mopatis in the HBO pilot of Game of Thrones, but because of scheduling conflicts the role was then given to Roger Allam. McNeice appeared as Winston Churchill in four episodes of Doctor Who in 2010 and 2011; he had previously played Churchill in the 2008 premiere production of the Howard Brenton play Never So Good, and later played him again in the 2012 stage version of The King's Speech.

McNeice also starred as The Architect in the 2017 independent feature film, The House of Screaming Death.

== Personal life ==
He married Kate Nicholls, the daughter of Anthony Nicholls (actor), and lived in Broad Campden in Gloucestershire.

McNeice has three children.

== Selected filmography ==
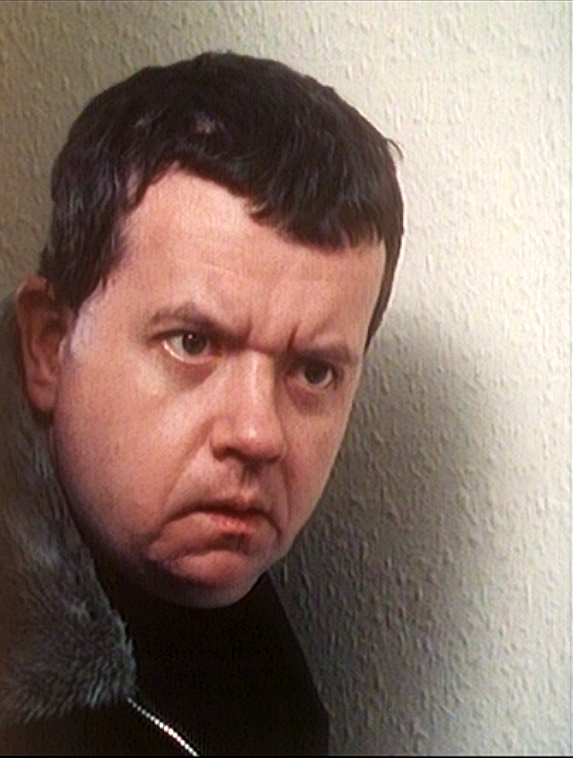
Ian McNeice in The Optimist

=== Television ===
Year	Title	Role	Notes
1982	Voice Over	"Fats" Bannerman	TV Movie
1982	The Life and Adventures of Nicholas Nickleby	Wackford Squeers / Scaley / Croupier	3 episodes (TV mini-series)
1983	The Cleopatras	Alexander	2 episodes (TV mini-series)
1984	Minder	Eric Morgan	Episode: "Rocky Eight and a Half"
1985	The Optimist	Thug	Episode: "The Light Fantastic"
1985	Edge of Darkness	Harcourt	5 episodes (TV mini series)
1987	Sputniks, Bleeps and Mr.Perry	Geoffrey Perry	TV drama/ documentary
1987	A Perfect Spy	Sefton Boyd	1 episode (TV mini-series)
1988	Wipe Out	Phillip Benton	5 episodes (TV mini-series)
1989	Boon	Graham Barker	Episode: "In For the Monet"
1989	Around the World in 80 Days	Batcular	3 Episodes (TV mini series)
1991	Lovejoy	Gervais Rackham	Episode: "The Italian Venus"
1991	The Ruth Rendell Mysteries	Ivan Teal	3 episodes
1992	B&B	Horace Gilbert	TV Movie
1992	Miss Pym's Day Out	Vicar of Finstock	TV Movie
1992	The Cloning of Joanna May	Dr. Holly	2 episodes (TV mini-series)
1992	The Blackheath Poisonings	George Collard	3 episodes (TV mini series)
1992	An Ungentlemanly Act	Dick Baker	TV Movie
1993	Watching	Minister	Episode: "Knotting"
1993	Inspector Morse	Pathologist	Episode: "Deadly Slumber"
1993	Stay Lucky	Franklyn Bysouth	10 episodes
1993	Age of Treason	Casca	TV Movie
1993	Don't Leave Me This Way	Oscar Ghilardi	TV Movie
1994	Ain't Misbehavin'	Chuck Pervis	Series 1, Episode 4
1994	Minder	Hargreaves	Episode: "All Quiet on the West End Front"
1994	Chef!	Gustave LaRoche	3 episodes
1994– 1995	Pie in the Sky	Barry Wilkes	2 episodes
1995	Sharpe's Battle	Wagonmaster-General Colonel Runciman	TV Movie
1995	Bugs	Doctor Peter Hunter	Episode: "A Sporting Chance"
1996	Cadfael	Canon Eluard	Episode: "The Devil's Novice"
1997	Have Your Cake and Eat It	Zief	4 episodes (TV mini-series)
1998	Hornblower	Mr. Tapling	Episode: The Examination for Lieutenant
1998	A Certain Justice	Desmond Ulrick	3 episodes
1998	Liverpool 1	George	Episode: "Lead Balloon"
1999	A Christmas Carol	Albert Fezziwig	TV Movie
1999	Joseph and the Amazing Technicolor Dreamcoat	Potiphar	Video
1999	David Copperfield	Mr. Dick	2 episodes (TV mini-series)
2000	Longitude	Astronomer Royal Doctor Nathanial Bliss	TV mini-series
2000	Frank Herbert's Dune	Baron Vladimir Harkonnen	3 episodes (TV mini-series)
2000	The Sleeper	Mr. Tarburck	1 episode (TV mini-series)
2000	Midsomer Murders	Village doctor	Episode: "Who Killed Cock Robin"
2001	Armadillo	Ivan	2 episodes (TV mini-series)
2002	Relic Hunter	Harry Kane	Episode: "Fountain of Youth"
2003	Frank Herbert's Children of Dune	Baron Vladimir Harkonnen	3 episodes (TV mini-series)
2004	Spartacus	Lentulus Batiatus	2 episodes (TV mini-series)
2004	Spooks	Judge	Episode: "Persephone"
2004–2022	Doc Martin	Bert Large	78 episodes
2005	The Last Detective	Raymond Price	Episode: "Three Steps to Hendon"
2005–2007	Rome	The Newsreader	20 episodes
2007	New Tricks	Michael Meadowcroft	Episode: "Big Topped"
2008	Lewis	Reverend Francis King	Episode: "Life Born of Fire"
2009	Cleopatra: Portrait of a Killer	Cassius Dio (Historian)	TV film
2010–2011	Doctor Who	Winston Churchill	4 episodes
2010	Jonathan Creek	Father Roderick Alberic	Episode: "The Judas Tree"
2012	The Mystery of Edwin Drood	Mayor Sapsea	2 episodes (TV mini-series)
2021	Foundation	Master Statistician Tivole	Episode: "Barbarian at the Gate"
2022	The Sandman	Bartender	Episode: "The Sound of Her Wings"

=== Film ===
Year	Title	Role	Notes
1982	Voice Over	"Fats" Bannerman	
1983	Grizzly II: The Concert	Bernie	
1984	Top Secret!	Blind souvenir salesman	
1986	Whoops Apocalypse	Thrush	
1987	Personal Services	Harry	
1987	84 Charing Cross Road	Bill Humphries	
1987	Cry Freedom		Uncredited
1987	The Lonely Passion of Judith Hearne	Bernard Rice	
1988	The Raggedy Rawney	Farmer	
1989	Valmont	Azolan	
1990	1871	Prince of Wales	
1990	The Russia House	Merrydew	
1991	Secret Friends	First Businessman	
1992	Year of the Comet	Ian	
1994	No Escape	King	
1995	Funny Bones	Stanley Sharkey	
1995	The Englishman Who Went Up a Hill But Came Down a Mountain	George Garrad	
1995	Ace Ventura: When Nature Calls	Fulton Greenwall	
1997	The Beautician and the Beast	Iva Grushinsky	
1997	A Life Less Ordinary	Mayhew	
1998	How to Make the Cruelest Month	Peggy Asks	
1999	The Auteur Theory	Sir Maximilian Fair Brown	
1999	The Cherry Orchard	Pishchik	
2000	The Nine Lives of Tomas Katz	Inspector	
2001	Anazapta	Bishop	
2001	The Body	Dr. Sproul	
2001	Town & Country	Peter Principal	
2001	The Fourth Angel	MI5 officer Lewison	
2001	From Hell	Dr. Robert Drudge	
2001	Conspiracy	Dr Gerhard Klopfer	
2002	Amnèsia	Doug Chandler	
2002	Man and Boy	Nigel Batty	
2002	The Final Curtain	Priest	
2003	Chaos and Cadavers	Harry Kane	
2003	I'll Be There	Graham	
2003	Blackball	Hugh the Sideburns	
2004	Freeze Frame	Forensic Profiler Saul Seger	
2004	Around the World in 80 Days	Colonel Kitchener	
2004	The Rocket Post	Alex Miln	
2004	Bridget Jones: The Edge of Reason	Quizmaster	
2005	White Noise	Raymond Price	
2005	The Hitchhiker's Guide to the Galaxy	Kwaltz	Voice only
2005	Oliver Twist	Limbkins	
2006	The Black Dahlia	Coroner	
2008	Day of the Dead	DJ Paul	
2008	Valkyrie	Joachim von Kortzfleisch	
2008	Just Because You're Paranoid...	The Therapist	Short film
2012	Nativity 2: Danger in the Manger	Mr. Peterson Senior	
2017	The Man Who Invented Christmas	Edward Chapman	
2017	The House of Screaming Death	The Architect	
2023	Napoleon	Louis XVIII	
2024	We Are Tourists	Harry	

=== Audio Drama ===
Year	Title	Role	Notes	Ref.
2007	Doctor Who: The Eighth Doctor Adventures	Zues	Episode: Immortal Beloved	
2010	Alex Shearer - The Diabolical Gourmet	Gourier		
2012	Doctor Who: The Fourth Doctor Adventures	Harcourt	Episode: The Renaissance Man	
2016–2018	The Churchill Years	Winston Churchill		
2017	Modesty Blaise: The Silver Mistress	Sir Gerald Tarrant		
2018	Doctor Who: Ravenous 1	Winston Churchill	Episode: Their Finest Hour	
2019	Betsy and Napoleon	Balcombe		
2020	Doctor Who: The Monthly Adventures	Winston Churchill	Episode: Subterfuge	
2020	Doctor Who: The Third Doctor Adventures Volume 06	Winston Churchill	Episode: Operation Hellfire	
