= A Christmas Carol (1999 film) =

Television film by David Jones

- DVD cover
- Based on: A Christmas Carol by Charles Dickens
- Written by: Peter Barnes
- Directed by: David Jones
- Starring: Patrick Stewart; Richard E. Grant; Joel Grey
- Composer: Stephen Warbeck
- Countries of origin: United Kingdom; United States
- Original language: English

Production
- Executive producers: Robert Halmi, Sr. Patrick Stewart
- Producer: Dyson Lovell
- Cinematography: Ian Wilson
- Editor: David Martin
- Running time: 95 minutes
- Production companies: TNT Productions; Turner Television; Hallmark Entertainment

Original release
- Network: TNT
- Release: December 5, 1999

A Christmas Carol is a 1999 Christmas fantasy television film based on Charles Dickens' 1843 novella A Christmas Carol that was first televised December 5, 1999, on TNT. It was directed by David Jones and stars Patrick Stewart as Ebenezer Scrooge and Richard E. Grant as Bob Cratchit.

== Plot ==
Moneylender Ebenezer Scrooge buries his friend and business partner Jacob Marley before returning to work at his counting house. Seven years later, on Christmas Eve 1843, Scrooge's loyal, but meek clerk Bob Cratchit is the target of Scrooge's cruelty and bitterness. Scrooge declines his nephew Fred Bowley's invitation to join him for Christmas dinner, dismisses two gentlemen collecting charitable donations and frightens away a carol singer by brandishing a ruler. Scrooge reluctantly gives Cratchit Christmas Day off so long as he comes in early the next day. Returning home, Scrooge encounters the tortured ghost of Marley. Marley warns Scrooge that the suffering he causes others, he will have to repay - even in death, and says Scrooge must either repent his wickedness or suffer a worse punishment than his own. Marley says three spirits will visit Scrooge over the course of three nights before departing.

At one o'clock, Scrooge is visited by the angellike Ghost of Christmas Past, who takes him back in time to his lonely childhood in boarding school, where his friends go home for Christmas but he is not wanted, because his father turned against him after his mother died. Scrooge's sister, Fran, Fred's late mother, says that their father has changed, agreeing that he could come home for Christmas. Scrooge is employed by the benevolent Albert Fezziwig. At a party, Scrooge was in love with Belle, a young woman, and they became engaged. However, Belle chose to leave him when Scrooge proved unable to commit to her over amassing his fortune. Distraught, Scrooge extinguishes the Ghost.

Scrooge meets the Ghost of Christmas Present, who shows him the joys of Christmas Day. They visit Cratchit's house, where Scrooge is astonished to find that Martha Cratchit is a hardworking young girl and that Cratchit has an ill son, Tiny Tim. The family is content with their small dinner. The Ghost comments that Tiny Tim will likely not live unless something changes. The ghost then shows Scrooge Christmas being celebrated on a lighthouse, a ship, and by miners, before they visit Fred's Christmas party, where he defends his uncle from his guests' snide remarks. The ghost shows prisoners celebrating carols as he begins aging, telling Scrooge his life is ending and warning him to beware of "Ignorance" and "Want", who manifest themselves as two wretched children. The Ghost vanishes.

The Ghost of Christmas Yet to Come arrives and takes Scrooge into the future. At the stock exchange, Scrooge sees business colleagues discuss a man's death and how they just attend his funeral if lunch is provided. In a den, Scrooge sees a charwoman, a laundress, and an undertaker trading the man's stolen possessions. Scrooge is shown the dead man under a shroud but is reluctant to see his face. He asks to see anyone showing emotion for the man and is shown a couple happy how his death has freed them from debt. When asked to see tenderness connected with a death, the Ghost transports Scrooge to Cratchit's house, where Tiny Tim has died and the Crachits are in mourning. At a cemetery, the Ghost reveals Scrooge's name carved on a gravestone. Scrooge vows to change his ways just as the Ghost closes its eyes and lifts its head. The grave opens, and Scrooge sees his corpse, before falling into an abyss and waking up to find himself alive in his bed.

Joyous, Scrooge finds the ghosts had visited him all in one night instead of three, and that it is Christmas Day. Scrooge anonymously sends Bob's family a large turkey for Christmas dinner and ventures out among London's citizens to spread cheer, even singing carols in church. He reluctantly visits and reconciles with Fred, shares a Christmas dinner, and dances for the first time in years. The next day, Scrooge plays a prank on Bob, pretending to be about to scold him for lateness, but instead giving him a raise and offering to assist his family. Scrooge comes to treat everyone around him with kindness and compassion, and becomes a second father to Tim, who does not die and recovers, embodying the Christmas spirit. Scrooge welcomes the Cratchits to his house.

== Cast ==
- Patrick Stewart – Ebenezer Scrooge
  - Kenny Doughty – Young Ebenezer Scrooge
- Richard E. Grant – Bob Cratchit
- Bernard Lloyd – Jacob Marley's Ghost
- Ben Tibber – Tiny Tim Cratchit
- Joel Grey – Spirit of Christmas Past
- Desmond Barrit – Spirit of Christmas Present
- Tim Potter – Spirit of Christmas Future
- Ian McNeice – Albert Fezziwig
- Saskia Reeves – Mrs. Cratchit
- Dominic West – Fred
- Annabel Mullion – Emily Bowley
- Trevor Peacock – Old Joe
- Liz Smith – Mrs. Dilber (Charwoman, role reprised from the 1984 adaptation)
- Elizabeth Spriggs – Mrs. Riggs (Laundress)
- Laura Fraser – Belle
- Celia Imrie – Mrs. Bennett
- John Franklyn-Robbins – Mister Crump (Undertaker)
- Claire Slater – Martha Cratchit
- Zoe Timmins – Belinda Cratchit
- Barnaby Francis – Young Boy Cratchit
- Tabitha Francis – Young Girl Cratchit
- Jeremy Swift – Mr. Williams
- Rosie Wiggins – Fran (Scrooge's sister)
- Crispin Letts – Topper Haines
- Helen Coker – Betsy

== Production ==
The film was produced after Patrick Stewart performed a series of successful one-man shows of A Christmas Carol on Broadway and in London.

=== Inspiration ===
Rather than deliberately trying to resemble either the 1938 MGM version or the 1984 made-for-TV version, this adaptation takes as its inspiration the 1951 film version in the grimness of some of its scenes and set design.

Liz Smith had previously played Mrs. Dilber in the 1984 adaptation. Ian McNeice would go onto play Edward Chapman in 2017's The Man Who Invented Christmas, which details the making of the book. Joel Grey had portrayed a spirit in the Dallas series finale "Conundrum".

== Critical reception ==
In a positive review, Michael Speier of Variety praised the cast and direction, and wrote:

"Oft-told tales are difficult to pull off, but ... this one gets it right ... Director David Jones displays a smooth hand that adds mounds of style to the rendition, and his approach to Peter Barnes' script is a tribute to delicate staging ... Stewart as Scrooge is such a perfect piece of casting that it will be hard to imagine anyone else as the sour ol' tightwad in years to come."

The New York Times also gave the film a positive review.

Mary Ann Johanson praised Stewart's performance.

In 2019, Robert Keeling of Den of Geek called it a "steadfastly faithful adaptation, but it lacks any warmth, and while it does the darker stuff quite well, it doesn’t really exude Christmas spirit. It feels like we're being lectured about Dickens' story rather than being given an entertaining film. Marley's ghost is pretty creepy, and the three ghosts are on the whole nicely done, though the scenes involving Christmas Yet To Come don't feel spooky enough at all. Richard E. Grant is fine as the hard-done-by clerk Bob Cratchit, but his children are especially irritating, with Tiny Tim vying for the coveted 'most irritating and poorly acted' award with his fellow 1938 and 1984 Tiny Tims. The sets are impressive, and the attention to detail can't be faulted, but it just lacks any sense of fun."

=== Awards ===
Patrick Stewart was nominated for Outstanding Performance by a Male Actor in a Miniseries or Television Movie at the Screen Actors Guild Awards in 2000. Ian Wilson was nominated for Outstanding Cinematography at the Emmy Awards in 2000.

== See also ==
- List of Christmas films
- List of ghost films
- Adaptations of A Christmas Carol
