= Paranoid (film) =

- Directed by: John Duigan
- Written by: John Duigan
- Produced by: Steve Christian; Miles Donnelly; Jo Human; Peter La Terriere; Gareth Neame; Paul Trijbits
- Starring: Jessica Alba; Iain Glen; Jeanne Tripplehorn; Ewen Bremner; Mischa Barton; Gina Bellman
- Cinematography: Sławomir Idziak
- Edited by: Humphrey Dixon
- Music by: Charlie Mole
- Distributed by: Portman Entertainment Group
- Release date: 30 March 2000 (Brussels International Festival of Fantasy Film)
- Running time: 93 minutes
- Country: United Kingdom
- Language: English

Paranoid is a 2000 independent thriller film, directed by John Duigan, which was made for theatrical release but subsequently received a limited international theatrical release. It was released directly to video in most countries. It stars Jessica Alba and Iain Glen.

== Plot ==
The film begins at a fashion show, where Chloe Keene (Jessica Alba) takes the catwalk. She returns home to her boyfriend Toby (Oliver Milburn) and tells him what a great time she had in New York. The phone rings, but no one is on the other end, and she tells her friend she will change her number. After this, she goes to a shoot, where she meets her other boyfriend, Ned (Gary Love), who offers to take her out to a reunion of his former band. She goes home, and lies to Toby that she will be visiting someone in Brighton.

Chloe falls asleep in the car due to pills she has taken, and wakes up when she arrives at the reunion. She gets a phonecall from a stalker with a strange voice, a different one to the one that called earlier. At the reunion, she meets Stan (Iain Glen), his wife Rachel (Jeanne Tripplehorn), his deaf daughter Theresa (Mischa Barton), and his brother Gordon (Ewen Bremner), who films the party. While they are having lunch, Ned's wife Eve (Gina Bellman) arrives, and is rude to her, causing her to cut her hand on a glass. Eve tells her that she wants her to bleed to death,

Chloe goes outside, and later on, Stan comes to find her. He tells her that everyone else has gone, but she can stay the night. While she is in the bath, Rachel enters and asks her what she thinks during photoshoots. Chloe tells her that she just pretends during them. When she gets out of the bath, she finds that Graham has put the handcuffs Ned gave her on the bed. She goes to bed, and hears a noise outside. When she goes to investigate, Stan takes her back into the bedroom and drugs her, so she falls asleep.

She wakes up again, and calls her friend, who hangs up on her. She decides to go downstairs, and sees Gordon watching the tapes of earlier in the evening. When he goes to bed, she snatches one and starts to watch it, seeing herself being sexually assaulted. Someone attempts to open the door, so she escapes through the window and gets outside, where she faints after seeing Stan in the car.

She wakes up in the basement, where Stan handcuffs her to the bed. Meanwhile, her silent stalker Clive (Kevin Whateley) is still phoning her up. Using her barefeet to pick up the phone, Chloe answers, and tells him she is trapped in the house that used to be a hotel. Theresa finds the tapes somewhere, and makes a poster to hand in to the police about Chloe, but they just laugh. Rachel finds the phone, and the group decide to hide it in the shed.

Clive decides to make his way to the house, and Rachel gets rid of him. He phones Chloe and hears the phone in the shed, ringing, so decides to call the police. Inside, Theresa finds Chloe, but is unable to undo the cuffs. Ned arrives and tells Chloe they will need to make a tape of her enjoying herself, in case she tells the police what they have done.

Stan tells Gordon that they need to kill Chloe, and they bundle her into a car. Unknown to them, they are followed by Clive. Ned tells Rachel that if they go through with their plan, they will be accessories to murder. Upstairs, Theresa breaks the window with a chair, and escapes down the side of the house, just as the police arrive. Ned gets her into the police car, and tells them to get out of there.

Stan and Gordon arrive at their destination and Clive sees them. Stan distracts Clive, as Gordon tries to cover up Chloe's noise. When Stan threatens him, Clive attempts to run him over, narrowly missing. He then begins chasing Gordon around in a circle, as the police arrive, and arrest Stan.

Back at home, Clive gets some dinner from his wife, and looks out of his window to see Chloe getting back home. She calls Toby, who is playing the saxophone. After she hangs up, he reveals himself to be her other stalker.

== Cast ==
- Jessica Alba as Chloe Keane
- Iain Glen as Stan
- Jeanne Tripplehorn as Rachel
- Ewen Bremner as Gordon
- Mischa Barton as Theresa
- Kevin Whately as Clive
- Gina Bellman as Eve
- Oliver Milburn as Toby
- Gary Love as Ned
- Amy Phillips as Michelle

== Critical reception ==
Paranoid received an extremely negative reaction from film critics. Based on 3 reviews on review aggregator Rotten Tomatoes, 0% of critics gave the film a positive review, with an average rating of 0/10.
