= St Francis' College, Letchworth =

St. Francis' College
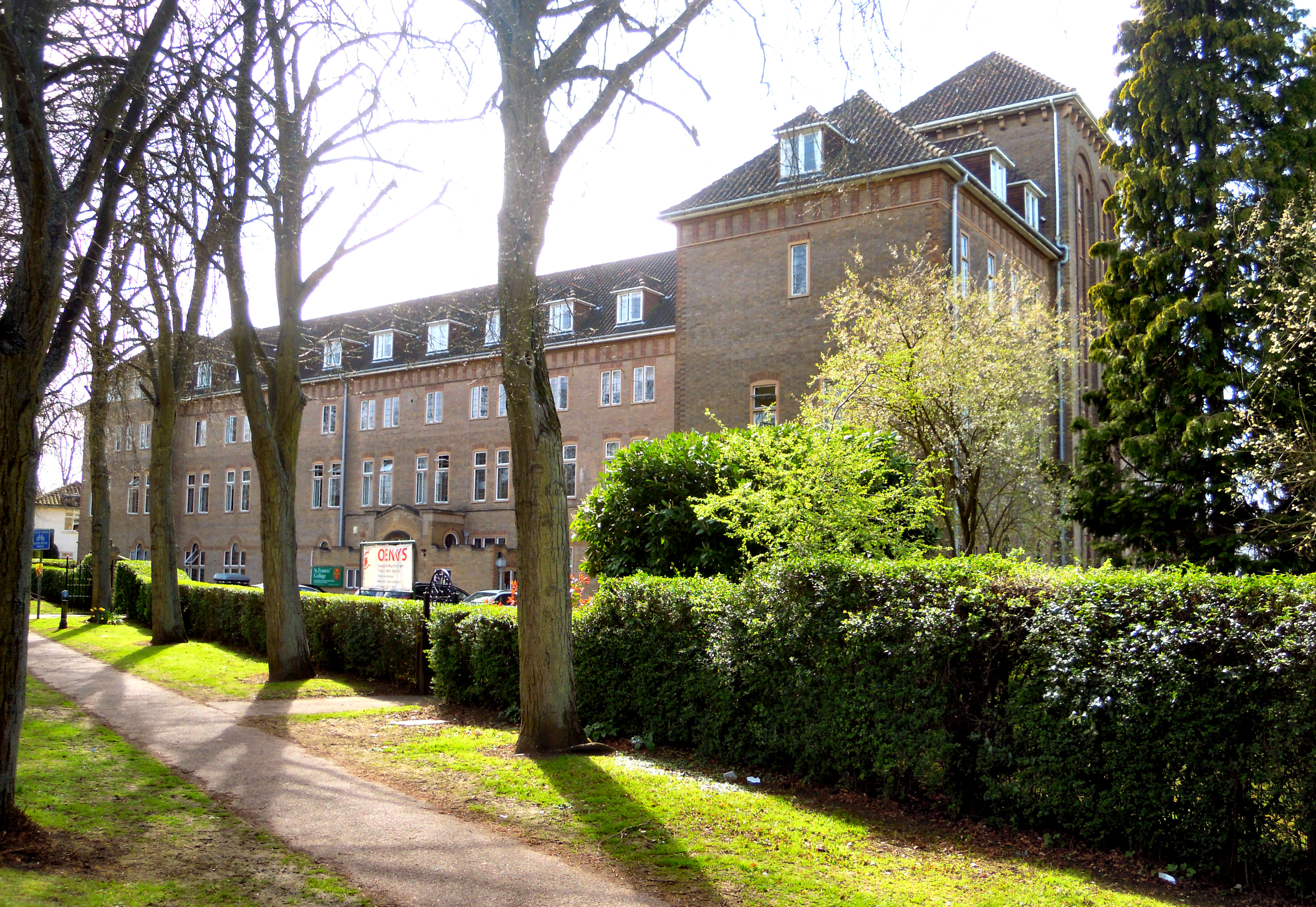
- St Francis' College from The Broadway in 2017

Location
- The Broadway; Letchworth Garden City, Hertfordshire, SG6 3PJ; England; 51.971888°N 0.232955°W

Information
- Type: Independent day and boarding
- Motto: Cor unum, anima una (One heart, one soul)
- Established: 1933
- Chairman: Amit Mehta
- Head: Julia Spence
- Gender: Girls
- Age: 3 months to 18
- Enrolment: 380
- Publication: The Oriole
- Website: http://www.st-francis.herts.sch.uk

St. Francis' College is an independent day and boarding school for children aged 3–18 in Letchworth, Hertfordshire. The site is within the Letchworth Conservation Area, management of which is the responsibility of the Letchworth Garden City Heritage Foundation (formerly the Letchworth Corporation). The College occupies a single campus of 3.1 hectares (7.66 acres) comprising a number of buildings, playing fields, gardens and other facilities.

== History ==
Originally built for St Christopher School, Letchworth, the school buildings belong to the period from 1919 to 1938 when Letchworth was being developed as the first garden city.

In 1933, the school was acquired by the Sisters of Charity of Jesus and Mary to found St Francis' College, reflected in aspects of the buildings including the chapel. In 1983, the sisters withdrew. The College administration was transferred to an educational charity, St Francis’ College Trust; the College became multi-denominational.

The main entrance is into the Broadway building, a substantial building extending to four floors, plus a basement. It is constructed from steel uprights and beams, in-filled with concrete floor slabs and brick exterior walls. It was built in 1938; the foundation stone was placed by Bishop Eugène van Rechem. Extensions were made in the 1960s to the dining hall and chapel above and the JCR (junior common room) and the chapel annexe was added. The Broadway building contains inter alia the residential area for the boarders, classrooms, sixth form centre, head's and their deputy's offices and some of the college administration staff.

The middle school building was built in 1919 and Mrs Annie Besant, president of the Theosophical education trust, laid what was then a cornerstone to mark the occasion. With later additions in 1924 the cornerstone became a single faced stone in the east wall of the building. It is, in part, two storeys high, organised around a central courtyard, within which is a temporary building.

The theatre and gymnasium were built in 1924 at the same time as the northern part of middle school and again the foundation stone was laid by the, later, Dr Annie Besant. The theatre has seating for 330 although the originally capacity was 600. Originally it was intended to be an assembly hall, but at the eleventh hour the design was altered to add a fly tower and create a theatre. The statue of St Francis, above the entrance, was added in 1937. Well known in its heyday (Olivier is believed to have made his first stage appearance here, as a babe-in-arms) the theatre became dilapidated in the 1980s, but the auditorium and stage were refurbished in 2001/02 with further improvements to the foyer and other areas in 2003/04. The prep. department building, a two-storey brick building with basement, was constructed in the 1940s with an extension in the late 1960s.

On-site recreation and sporting facilities include a 20-metre indoor heated swimming pool built in the early 1970s, five tarmac tennis/netball courts, a sports field and adjacent grassed sports/playing area. The prep school is provided, to the north of the Broadway building, in a modern and separate building, with an all-weather play area extending into an enclosed garden.

== Notable former pupils ==
- Jennie Bond, previously the BBC royal correspondent, attended St Francis' College.
- Nicola Fox, associate administrator for NASA's Science Mission Directorate
- Adenike Grange, former Nigerian minister in charge of the Federal Ministry of Health.
- Claire Slater, actress, attended the school.
- Deborah Turness, English journalist, CEO of BBC News, and of ITN (2021)
