= Joe Maddison's War =

2010 television film

- Written by: Alan Plater
- Directed by: Patrick Collerton
- Music by: Kevin Sargent
- Country of origin: United Kingdom
- Original language: English

Production
- Producers: Michele Buck; Howard Ella; Damien Timmer
- Cinematography: Chris Seager
- Editor: Michael Harrowes
- Running time: 85 minutes
- Production company: Mammoth Screen

Original release
- Network: ITV
- Release: 19 September 2010

Joe Maddison's War is a 2010 television film written by Alan Plater about strained family and social relations in wartime. Directed by Patrick Collerton and filmed partly on location in South Shields (including at Beamish Living Museum), it presents a view of World War II through the eyes of shipyard worker and World War I veteran Joe Maddison (played by Kevin Whately) who serves in the Home Guard during the Blitz while his son and son-in-law are enlisted for oversea service.

== Cast (main) ==
- Kevin Whately as Joe Maddison
- Sammy Dobson as Sheila Maddison
- Angela Lonsdale as Polly Maddison
- James Baxter as Alan Maddison
- John Woodvine as Father Connolly
- James Atherton as Tommy Cowell
- Robson Green as Harry Crawford
- Melanie Hill as Selina Rutherford
- Trevor Fox as Eddie Turnbull
- Nick Versteeg as Billy Nicholson
- Derek Jacobi as Major Simpson
- Jackie Phillips as Lily Parkinson
- Madelaine Newton as Jenny Barlow
- Charlie Richmond as Sergeant Bull
- Hayden Chippy as a Young Boy
- Evie May Norman as Mary
