= The Knights Templar School =

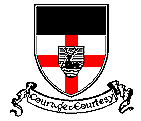

Location
- Park Street; Baldock, Hertfordshire, SG7 6DZ; England; 51°59′16″N 0°11′27″W

Information
- Type: Academy
- Motto: Courage & Courtesy
- Established: 1939
- Department for Education URN: 136608 Tables
- Ofsted: Reports
- Headteacher: Edward Hutchings
- Gender: Coeducational
- Age: 11 to 18
- Enrollment: 1421 (UKGOV School Benchmarking)
- Houses: Bennett, Crellin, Hancock, Hine, Knights, Pembroke, Templar
- Website: https://www.kts.school/

The Knights Templar School is a co-educational secondary school with academy status located in the market town of Baldock in North Hertfordshire, England. In a February 2006 Ofsted report, the school was described as "outstanding", one of only eight secondary schools in Hertfordshire to be so recognised. It retained its "outstanding" status following a further Ofsted inspection in February 2009. The Knights Templar School gained academy status on 1 April 2011. Following an Ofsted inspection in October 2012 the school was categorised as "good" against a newer, far more demanding Inspection framework. The School has a large sixth form and serves Baldock, Letchworth and the surrounding villages of North Hertfordshire.

In September 2019 the school celebrated its 80th anniversary.

== History ==
The school is named after the medieval order of the Knights Templar, who founded the village of Baldock and built the original 12th-century parish church of St. Mary the Virgin in the 1140s. The motto of the Knights Templar School is "Courage and Courtesy".

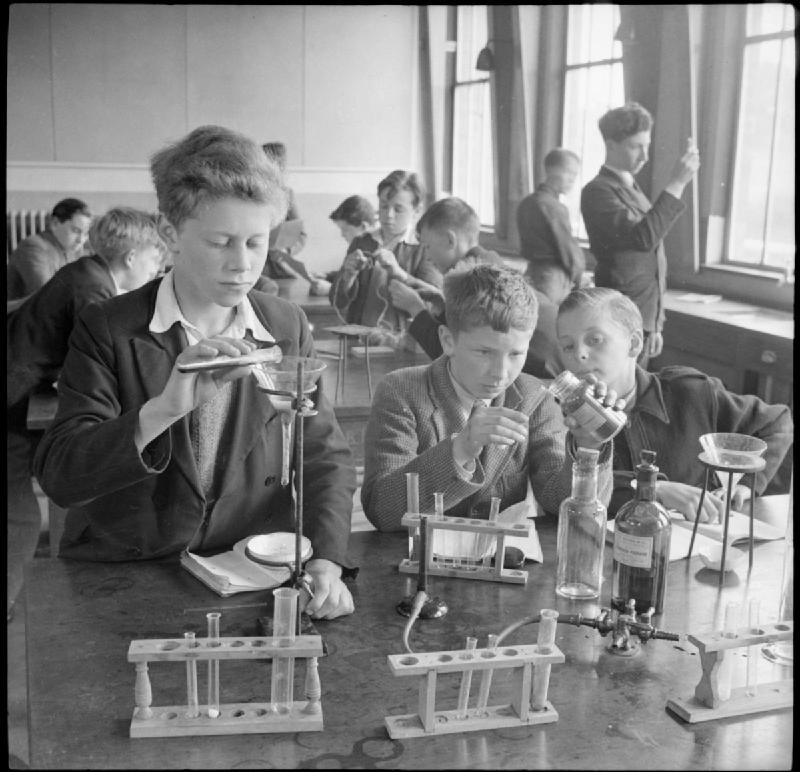
Boys carry out a science experiment at Baldock County Council School in 1944

The school opened the day after the start of the Second World War in 1939 as the Baldock County Council School and within a week of opening had welcomed evacuee children from Stratford in London; in 1944 a photographer from the Ministry of Information took a series of pictures of students at the school to show the positive way that a typical country school was adjusting to life during wartime. These images showed students having medical examinations, taking part in sports and domestic science lessons, cooking over open fires and cultivating the school's playing field to grow food.

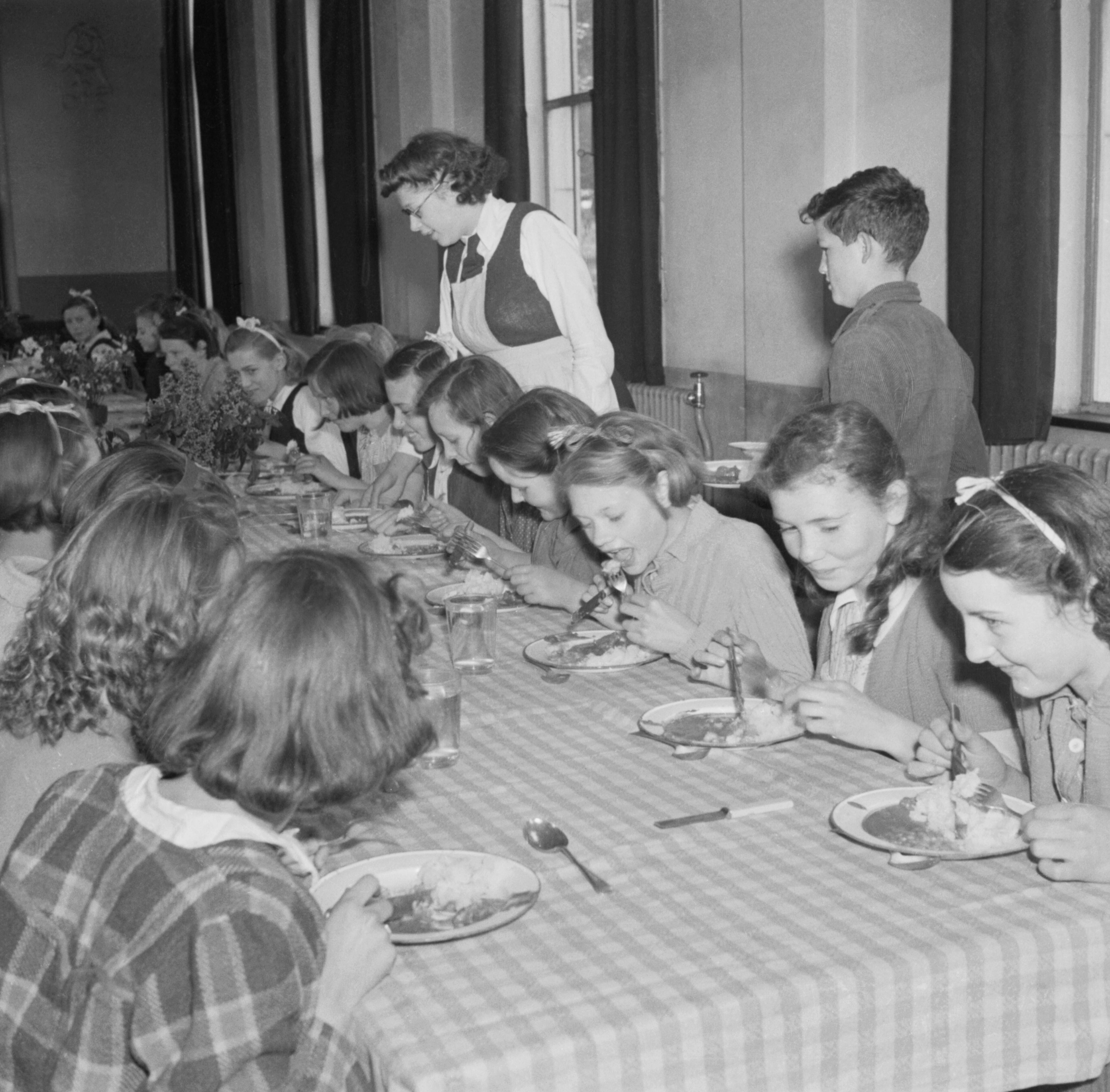
Children having lunch at Baldock County Council School in 1944

By 1949 the school was known as Baldock Secondary Modern School, at which time His Majesty's Inspector for Schools (HMI) found it to be flourishing under the 'dynamic personality' of the Headmaster, Mr Frank Hancock MBE, who had created a 'very happy and active school' with overseas trips, school camps, Sports Days and strong links with the local community. However, the inspectors found the syllabuses to be too ambitious with the school moving forward too quickly, with teaching staff confused by arrangements which were complicated and difficult to manage.

Finally, the school was renamed The Knights Templar School by Vivian Crellin, the then headmaster of the school and a scholar of Baldock's medieval history.

Since that time the school has been greatly extended with several new buildings and ever increasing pupil numbers, leading to oversubscription every year. As of September 2013 there are 1350 pupils, with 103 teachers and 60 support staff.

In September 2013 the school opened a new purpose-built Sixth Form block with specialist classrooms, tutor meeting rooms and computer suites, and a new Science Centre was opened in 2016 by Lord Robert Winston. As a former specialist school in sport the Knights Templar School also has a million-pound sports centre with fitness suite and a floodlit all-weather sports pitch.

In July 2017, the school press team writing KTS NewsKnight attended the prestigious national journalism competition, Shine School Media Awards and won several prizes.

== Houses ==
The school Houses are Crellin, Hancock, Hine, Pembroke, Bennett, Knights and Templar, named after former Headmasters of the school (Hancock and Crellin); local educationists (George N. Bennett, who taught at the Pond Lane (Council) School in Baldock for over 40 years) and Alderman Neville Hine who for many years was Chairman of Managers of Baldock County Council School and worked for the building of the Knights Templar School; 'Strongbow', the Earl of Pembroke (the school is built on land owned by the Earl in the medieval period), and the Knights Templar who built the parish church St. Mary the Virgin c.1125.

== Music at the school ==
The school has a strong musical tradition, with about a third of all pupils taking extra tuition in an instrument or voice. The Big Band and Senior Chamber Choir perform locally and the school organises a music tour bi-annually, geared mainly towards these two groups (though anyone is welcome). Recent tour locations include Budapest in Hungary during July 2006 and Liguria in Italy in July 2008. A former pupil, Frances Balmer, won the 2004 BBC Proms Young Composers' Competition.

Recent Sixth Former and Royal College of Music Junior Department student Ben Goldscheider played the french horn with the National Youth Orchestra and in 2013 was the joint winner of the Toddington Music Society Young Musician of the Year Competition. In 2014 he won The Marlowe Young Musician Of The Year Competition, and in May 2016 he won the Brass Final in the BBC Young Musician competition, going on to the Semi Finals and then the Finals. From October 2016 he began four years music study at the Barenboim-Said Academy in Berlin and performs internationally.

== Recent years ==
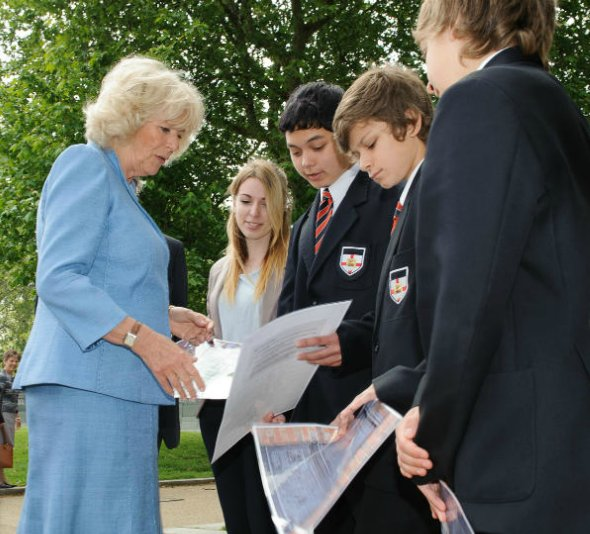
The Duchess of Cornwall talks to students from the school in 2012

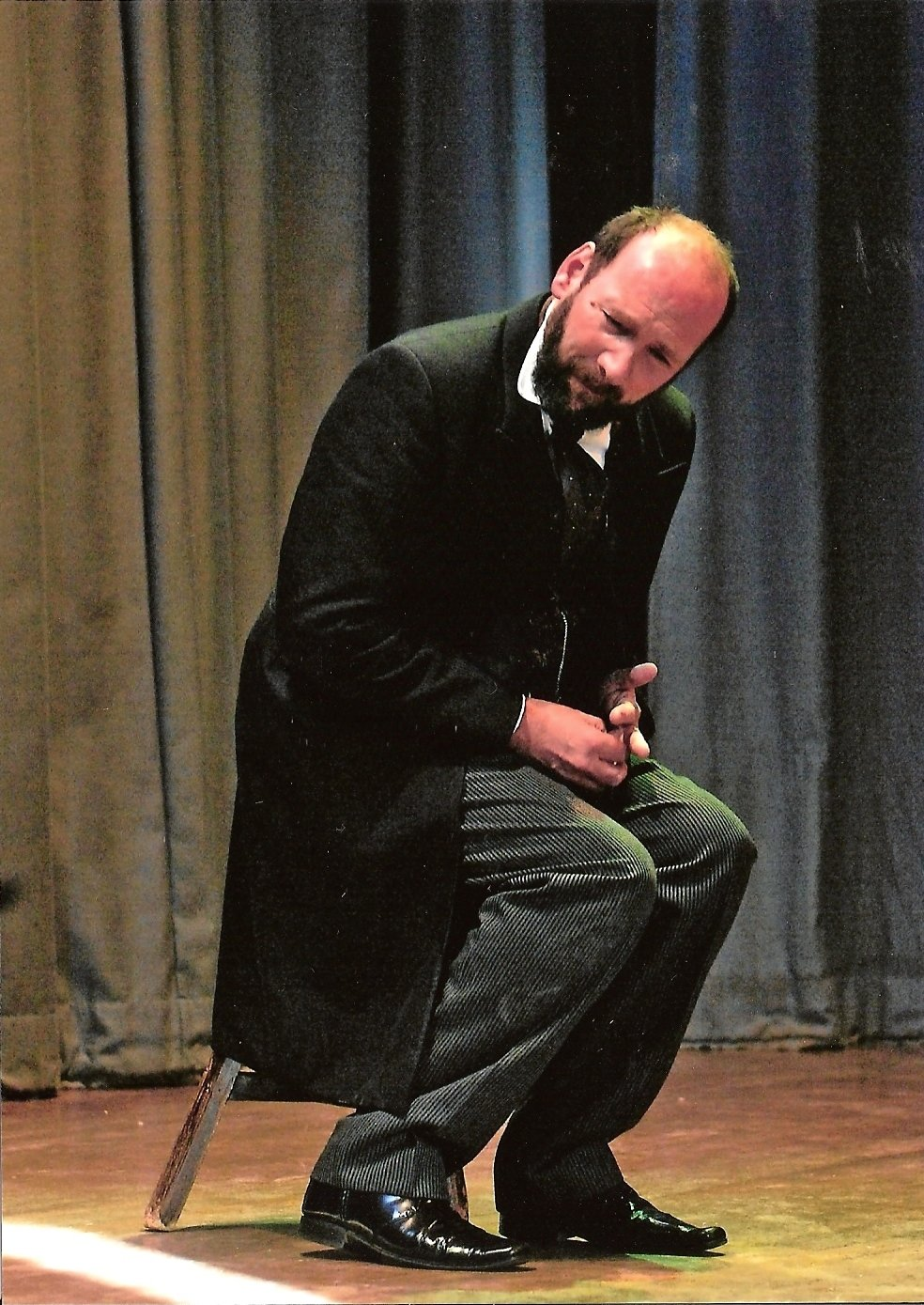
Gerald Dickens performs at the school (2010)

The Knights Templar School received coverage in the national media in 2002 over the 'fixing' of 'A' level grades by examination boards. The school was the first in the country to appeal the grades awarded to its students in GCE Psychology.

From 2005 to 2013 it was a specialist school for Sport and the Performing Arts. In 2005 students from the school appeared as extras in the television film Tom Brown's Schooldays starring Alex Pettyfer and Stephen Fry.

In July 2007 the school's Art Department gained the Guinness World Record for Painting by Numbers.

Guest speakers at the school have included former politicians Shirley Williams and Edwina Currie, film and television composers David Arnold and Debbie Wiseman, Cardinal Basil Hume, academic Professor Lord Soulsby, IVF pioneer Peter Brinsden, scientist Professor Sir John Polkinghorne, Professor Mick Aston from Time Team, entrepreneur and founder of the online urban music platform SB.TV Jamal Edwards, former Cabinet Minister Lord MacGregor, two-times Olympic silver medallist Jonathan Glanfield, journalist and author Quentin Letts, musician, journalist and priest Richard Coles, businessman and civil servant Sir Peter Gershon and actor Shane Richie.

The Hoosiers performed an acoustic gig at the school in March 2011, and actor and performer Gerald Charles Dickens has made several appearances at the school in his one-man shows, including A Christmas Carol, based on the works of his great-great-grandfather Charles Dickens.

In June 2012 a group of students from the school met the Duchess of Cornwall as they had volunteered to help apply SmartWater to Baldock's war memorial in order to protect it from theft by metal thieves.

In February 2014 it was announced that the school's Headteacher from September 2014 would be Mr Timothy Litchfield, formerly Deputy Headteacher of Bishops Stortford High School and a specialist musician.

On 14 June 2014 Mr John Glover, the then Head of the Humanities Faculty and Co-ordinator for the Duke of Edinburgh's Award scheme, was appointed MBE in the Queen's Birthday Honours for services to Education. The award was in recognition of the more than 30 years voluntary service Mr Glover had given to running the Duke of Edinburgh's Award Scheme at the school. Under his supervision over 2000 students from the Knights Templar School received awards from the scheme.

== Headmasters ==
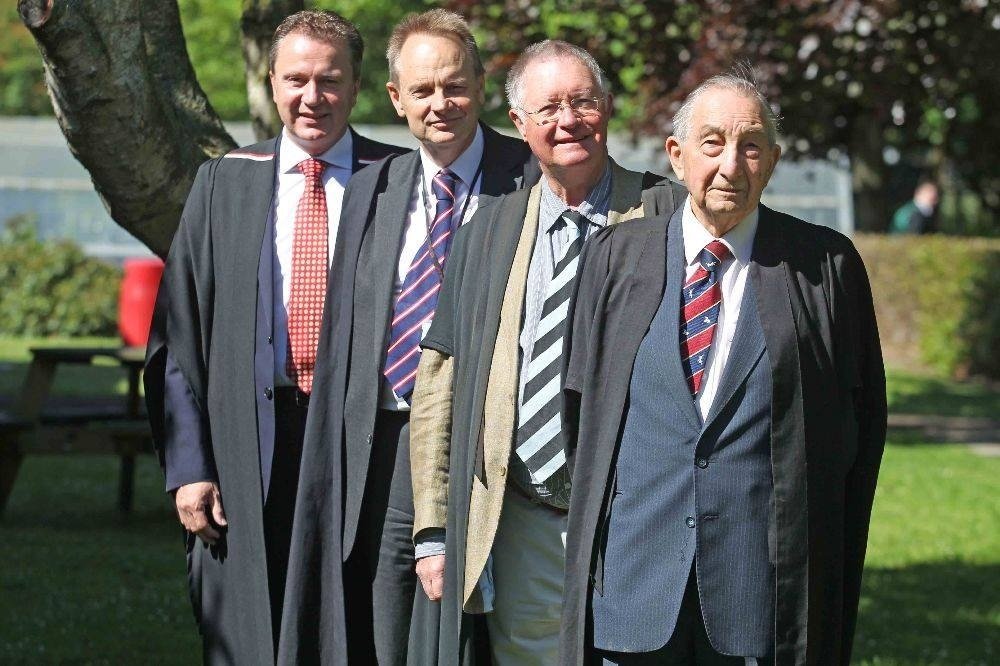
The most recent Headteachers - from left - Mr Tim Litchfield, Mr Andrew Pickering, Mr Peter Chapman and Mr Vivian Crellin (Excluding Mr Edward Hutchings).

- Mr Frank Hancock MBE (1939-1951)
- Mr John Tyler (1952–55)
- Mr Lennox (1956-1959)
- Mr Vivian Crellin (1960-1984)
- Mr Peter Chapman (1984-2006)
- Mr Andrew Pickering (2006–2014)
- Mr Tim Litchfield (2014–2021)
- Mr Edward Hutchings (2022–present)

== Notable former pupils and staff ==
=== Pupils ===
- Sydney Gregson, English rugby union player
- Keith Milow, artist, Harkness Fellow
- Leanne Wilson, actress
- Claire Slater, actress
- Elizabeth Hall, international athlete
- Deborah Turness, Editor of ITV News from 2004 to 2013 and former President of NBC News from August 2013 to 2017
- Ben Mosley, British expressionist artist
- Hugo Logan, professional footballer

=== Staff ===
- Adam Ficek, drummer with Babyshambles taught drums at the school

== Views of the school ==
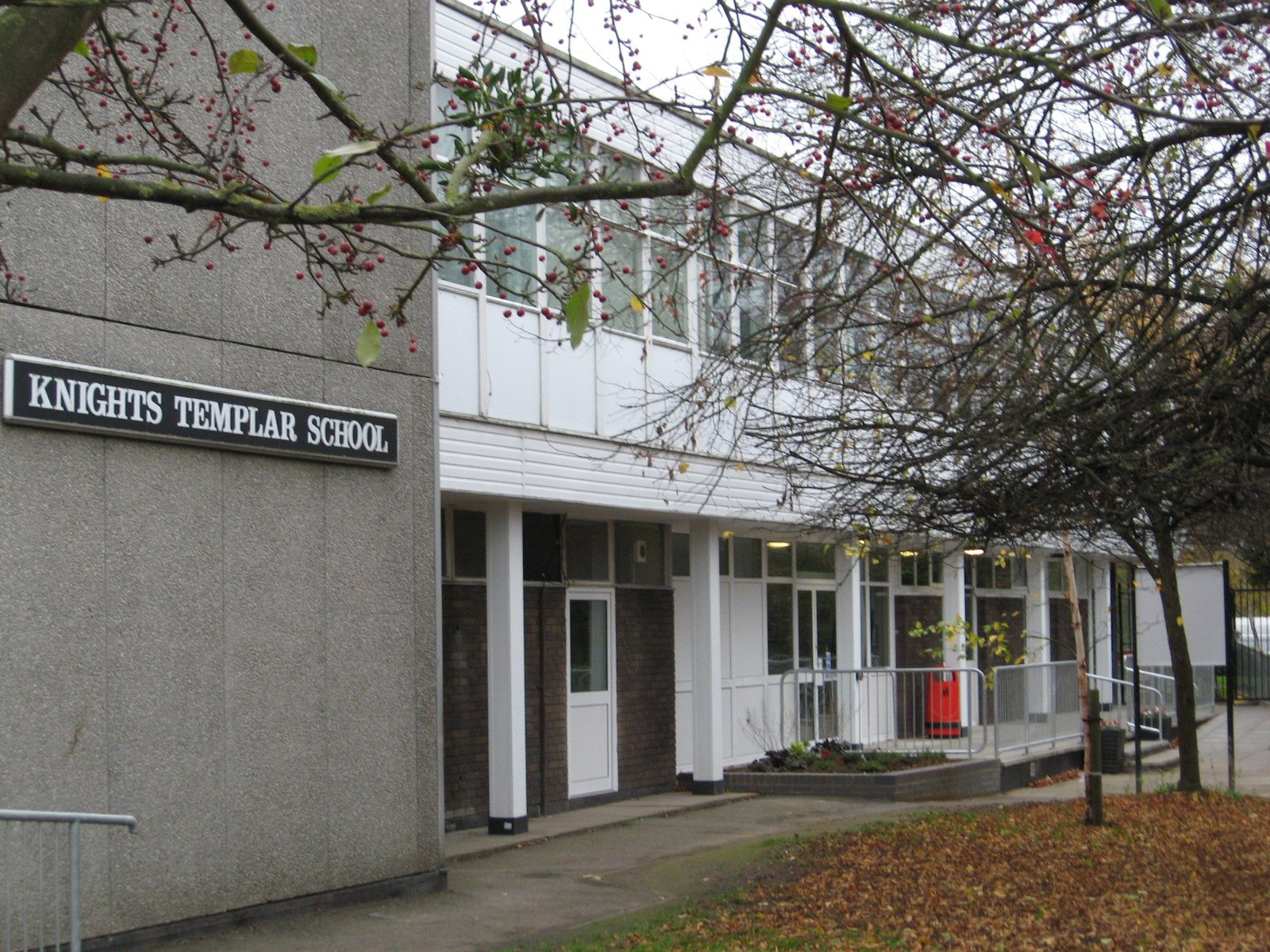
The Knights Templar School

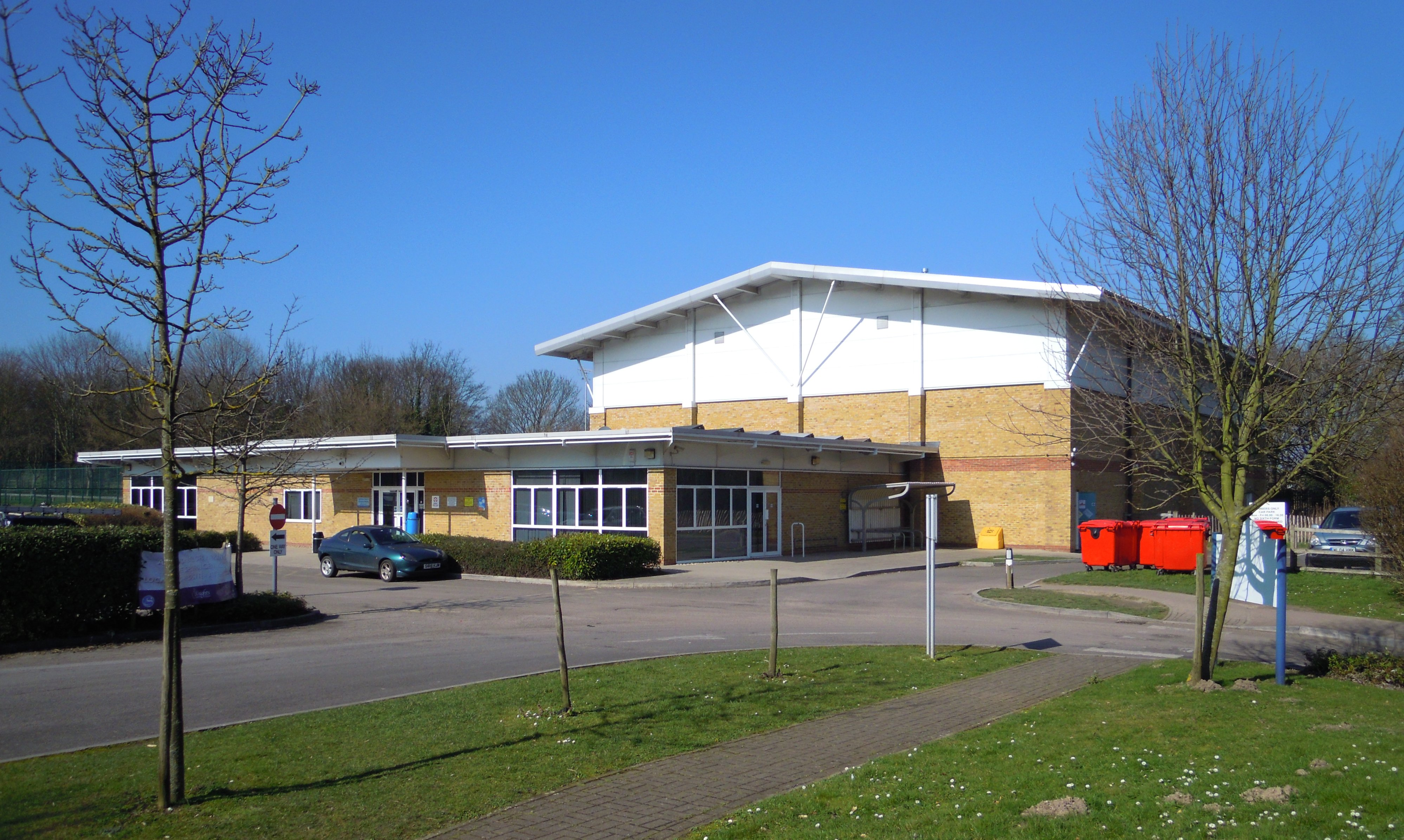
The Sports Hall and Fitness Centre

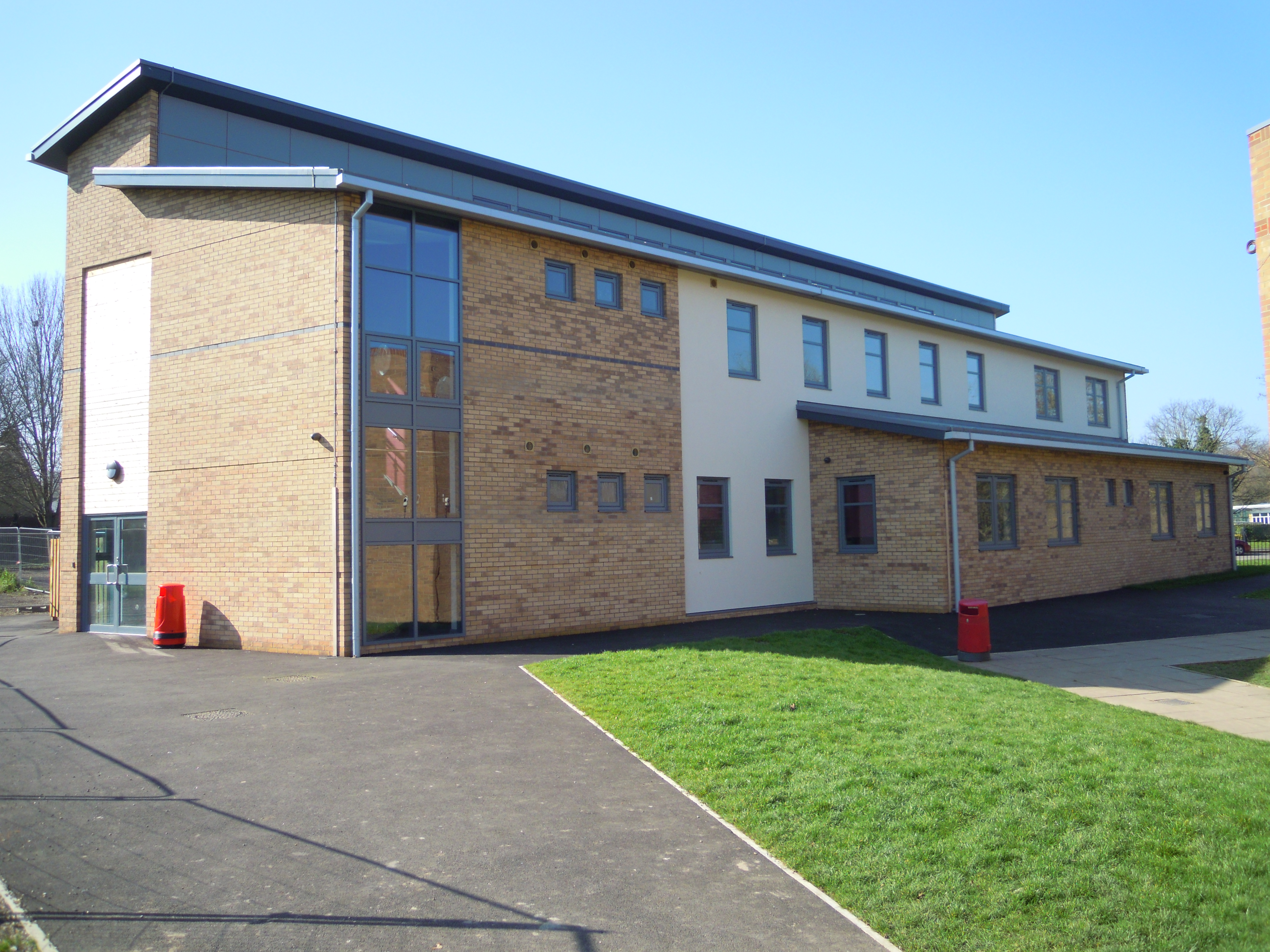
The Sixth Form block (opened 2013)

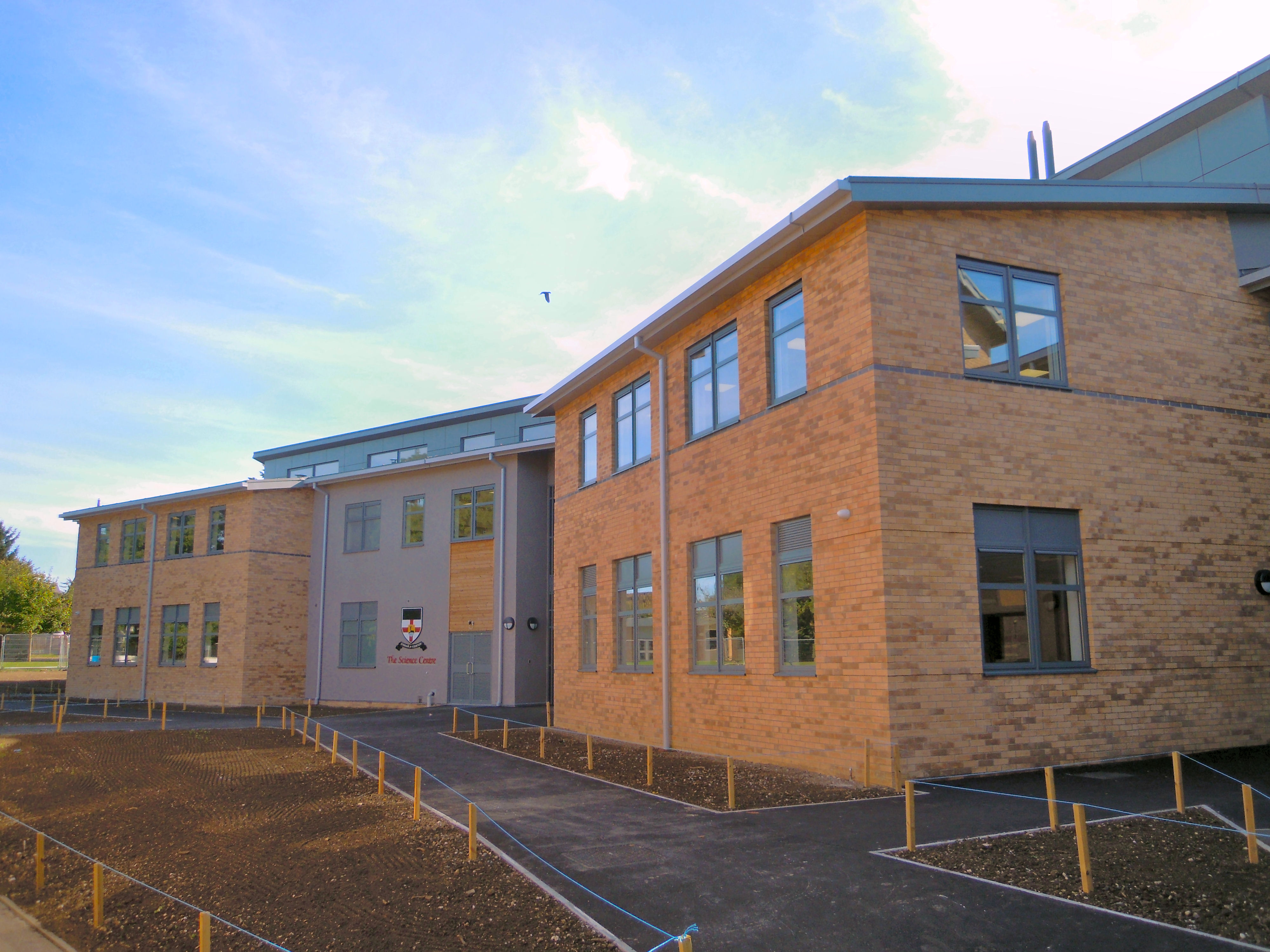
The Science Centre (opened 2016)

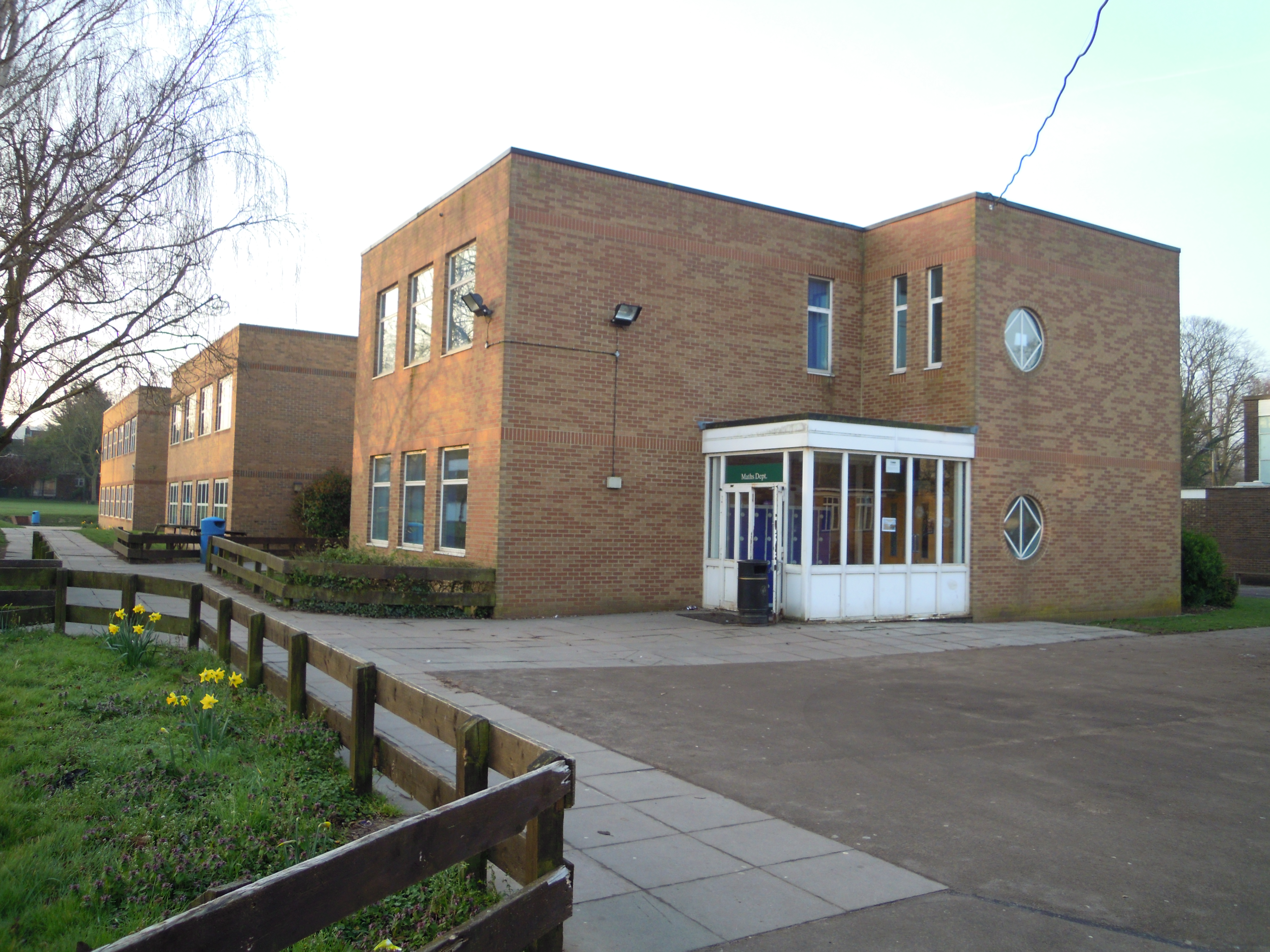
The T block entrance

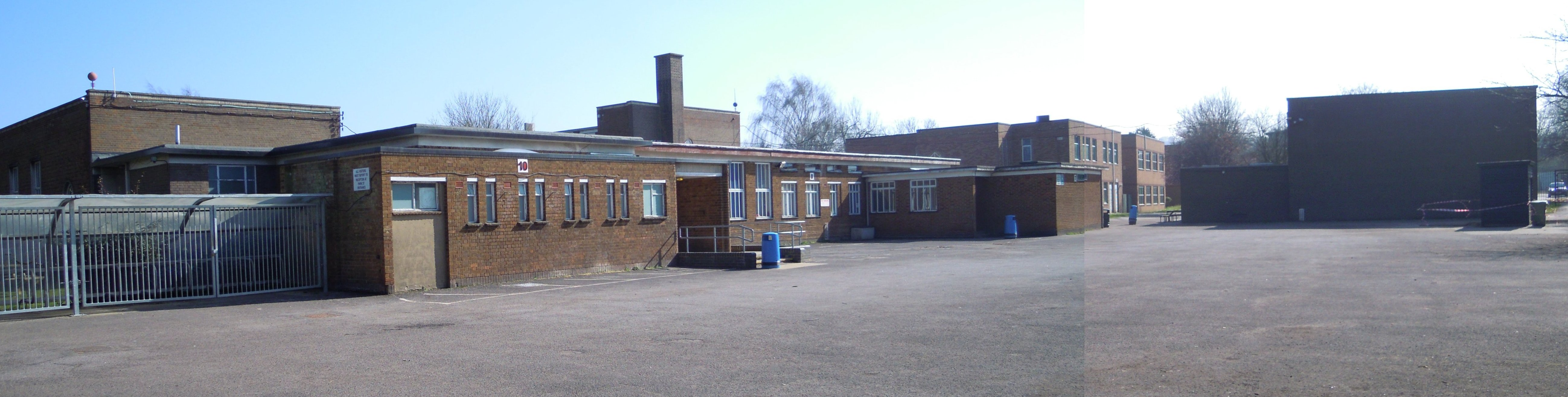
K block from the playground

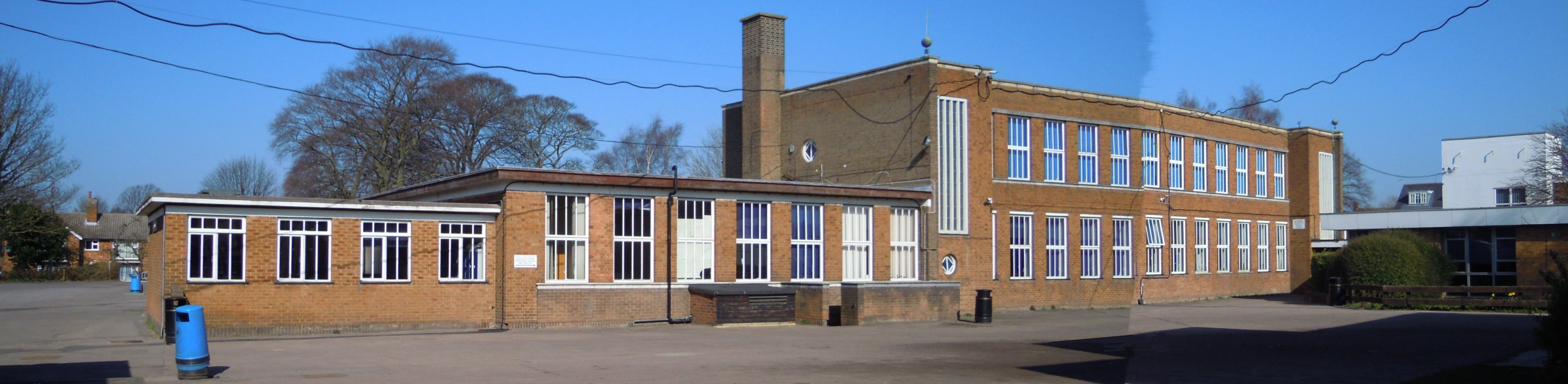
K block which opened in 1939
