= Claire Slater =

English actress

Claire Slater/ Claire Cassidy/ Claire Notley
- Born: 4 February 1984 (age 42); Shoreham-by-Sea
- Occupation: Actress
- Years active: 1990–present
- Spouse: Ben Notley

Claire Slater (born 4 February 1984) is an English actress.

== Education ==
She attended Hertfordshire schools St. Francis' College in Letchworth Garden City and The Knights Templar School in Baldock. In 2005 Slater completed a three-year Musical Theatre Diploma course at Laine Theatre Arts in Epsom.

== Career ==
Slater started her acting career in 1990 with an appearance in the thriller The Laughter of God (called Married to Murder in the USA) which starred Peter Firth and Amanda Donohoe. In 1992 she also appeared in the TV film An Ungentlemanly Act, which starred Ian Richardson and Rosemary Leach.

Other TV appearances include roles in The Children of the New Forest, the series Is Harry on the Boat? (2002) and the series Helen West (2002), but she is probably best known for playing Martha Cratchit in the 1999 version of A Christmas Carol, in which she appeared with Patrick Stewart, Joel Grey and Richard E. Grant.

More recently, Slater appeared in ITV's series Heartbeat (2006), and as Laura Goggin in an episode of Doctors (2013).

== Filmography ==
=== Television ===
Year	Title	Role	Notes
1991	Screen Two	Gilly Clemant	Episode: "The Laughter of God"
1992	An Ungentlemanly Act	Baker Girl #2	Television film
1998	Children of the New Forest	Clara Ratcliffe	Television film
1999	A Christmas Carol	Martha Cratchit	Television film
2002	Helen West	Waitress	Episode: "Shadow Play"
2002	Is Harry on the Boat?	Jenna	Episode #1.5
2006	Heartbeat	Denise Bailey	Episode: "Bad Company"
2013	Doctors	Laura Goggin	Episode: "Motherly Love"
