= Lizzie Hall =

British athlete

Elizabeth Hall (born 28 April 1985) is a former international British athlete competing as a 3000m cross country runner and steeplechaser.

She represented Great Britain at the 2006 IAAF World Cross Country Championships and competed at the European Athletic Championships twice.

== Life and career ==
Born in Stevenage in Hertfordshire, Lizzie Hall attended The Knights Templar School in Baldock, where she was a County level gymnast and netballer before graduating in Physiotherapy from Brunel University. She competed in the 2005 European U23 3000 m heats, the 2006 World Cross Country 4k (when she came in 65th), and in the 2007 European U23 3000 m heats. In the 2006 English National Cross Country Championships she won the gold medal, and the same year set a British record in the 3000m steeplechase.

Hall qualified to compete in the 2008 Beijing Olympic Games but was unable to take part owing to injury. She then aimed at competing in the 2012 Summer Olympics in London but failed to qualify. She is a member of Herts Phoenix Athletics Club.
