= Madelaine Newton =

British actress

Sheila Madelaine Whately, better known by her stage name Madelaine Newton, is a British actress best known for her portrayal of Dolly in 1970s BBC television drama When the Boat Comes In. Since 1984 she has been married to actor Kevin Whately, known for his role as Robert "Robbie" Lewis in both Inspector Morse and its spin-off Lewis. They have two children.

Newton has appeared alongside her husband several times: in the Inspector Morse episode "Masonic Mysteries" as Beryl Newsome - the love-interest of Morse - whom Morse was wrongly suspected of murdering; as his on-screen wife in the 1988 Look and Read educational serial, Geordie Racer; in the Alan Plater drama Joe Maddison's War, playing Jenny Barlow; and the love interest of Dennis Patterson (Tim Healy) in the second series of Auf Wiedersehen, Pet.
