= Kevin Whately =

English actor (born 1951)

Kevin Whately OBE
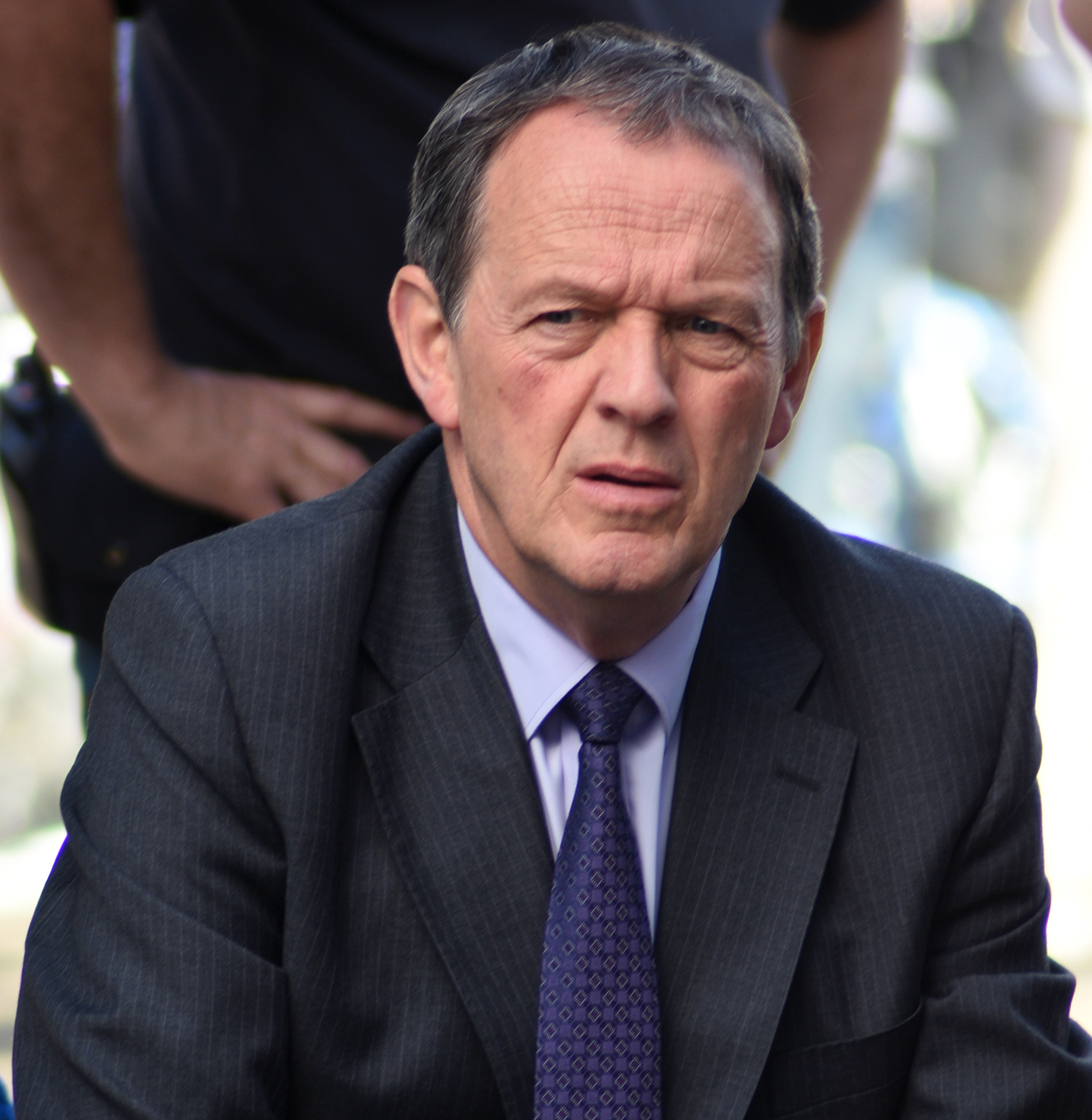
- Whately as Inspector Lewis in Oxford in 2015
- Born: 6 February 1951 (age 75); Brampton, Cumberland, England
- Education: Royal Central School of Speech and Drama
- Occupation: Actor
- Years active: 1979–present
- Television: Auf Wiedersehen, Pet; Inspector Morse; Lewis
- Spouse: Madelaine Newton (m. 1984)
- Children: 2

Kevin Whately OBE (born 6 February 1951) is an English actor. He is best known for his roles as Neville "Nev" Hope in the comedy drama Auf Wiedersehen, Pet; Robert "Robbie" Lewis in the British crime dramas Inspector Morse (1987–2000) and Lewis (2006–2015); and Jack Kerruish in the drama series Peak Practice (1993–1995). He has appeared in numerous other roles.

== Early life ==
Whately is from Brampton, near Carlisle, Cumberland. The family later moved to North Tynemouth when he was four years old. His mother, Mary (née Pickering), was a teacher and his father, Richard, was a Commander in the Royal Navy. His maternal grandmother, Doris Phillips, was a professional concert singer, his paternal grandfather, Herbert Whately, was Archdeacon of Ludlow, and his great-great-grandfather, Richard Whately, was Anglican Archbishop of Dublin. The BBC documentary Who Do You Think You Are?, broadcast in 2009, revealed that Whately is a descendant of Thomas Whately of Nonsuch Park (father of Thomas Whately), a leading London merchant, politician and writer who became a director of the Bank of England, and of Major Robert Thompson, a Parliamentarian during the English Commonwealth and later a tobacco plantation owner in Virginia.

Whately was educated at Barnard Castle School, and went on to study accounting and finance at Newcastle Polytechnic, graduating in 1969. He then trained as an actor at the Central School of Speech and Drama, graduating in 1975 after having partly supported himself by working for the National Theatre at The Old Vic. Before going professional, Whately was an amateur actor at the People's Theatre in Newcastle upon Tyne during the 1970s. His brother, Frank, is a lecturer at Kingston University in London.

According to Richard Marson's book celebrating 50 years of Blue Peter, Whately auditioned as a presenter for the show in 1980 but lost out to Peter Duncan.

== Career ==
Before turning to professional acting, Whately began his working life as a folk singer, and still plays the guitar, performing for charity concerts. Along with other Auf Wiedersehen, Pet stars, he makes an appearance at the biennial benefit concert Sunday for Sammy in Newcastle.

His acting career includes several stage plays, among them an adaptation of Twelve Angry Men, and film appearances in The Return of the Soldier, The English Patient, Paranoid and Purely Belter.

Whately's television appearances include episodes of Shoestring, Geordie Racer, Angels, Juliet Bravo, Strangers, Coronation Street, Auf Wiedersehen Pet, Alas Smith and Jones, Look and Read, You Must Be The Husband, B&B, Peak Practice, Skallagrigg, Murder in Mind, Inspector Morse, 2003 Comic Relief Auf Wiedersehen Pet, Lewis, New Tricks, Who Gets the Dog?, The Children, Silent Cry and Midsomer Murders. Whately provided one of the voices for the English-language version of the 1999 claymation children's television series Hilltop Hospital. He has also done voiceovers for a WaterAid advertisement.

In 1985, Whately appeared in a three-part Miss Marple adaptation ("A Murder Is Announced") for the BBC, playing Detective Sergeant Fletcher, opposite John Castle as Inspector Craddock. Two years later, his role as Detective Sergeant Lewis in the series Inspector Morse established him as a household name in the UK. Whately starred opposite the eponymous Inspector Morse, played by John Thaw, in 32 episodes over 13 years in the hugely successful series.

Whately reprised the role in the spin-off series Lewis, in which Lewis returns to Oxford as a full Inspector. With his new partner, the Cambridge-educated Detective Sergeant James Hathaway (Laurence Fox), Inspector Lewis solves murder mysteries while trying to rebuild his life after his wife's sudden death in a hit-and-run accident and to gain recognition from his initially sceptical new boss.

Whately was the lead in The Broker's Man, two series of 90 minute self-contained dramas about a former policeman turned insurance fraud investigator.

In 2010, Whately played the title role in the television film Joe Maddison's War about strained family and social relations in wartime. Directed by Patrick Collerton, it presented a view of World War II through the eyes of shipyard worker and World War I veteran Joe Maddison who serves in the Home Guard during the Blitz.

On the conclusion of filming the seventh series of Lewis, at the end of 2012, both Whately and Laurence Fox announced that they would take a break of at least a year before appearing in any more episodes. ITV indicated a continuing commitment to the series and that they wished to produce additional episodes of the programme. On 4 November 2012, Whately performed in a radio drama on BBC3 called The Torchbearers, which chronicles the circumstances of several UK citizens whose lives are changed through contact with the Olympic Torch. In 2013, the Live Theatre of Newcastle upon Tyne produced a series of performances of the unique, acclaimed one-person play, White Rabbit, Red Rabbit, which is enacted as a cold reading with no sets or costumes by a different performer each night. Whately was the actor for the sold-out performance of 10 March 2013. Following the end of the ninth and final series of Lewis, Whately announced he had no intention of returning to the role of "Lewis", a character he had played over a span of 28 years.

Whately was the patron of the Central School of Speech and Drama Full House Theatre Company for 2011.

== Personal life ==
Whately lives in Woburn Sands near Milton Keynes with his wife, actress Madelaine Newton, who starred in the 1970s BBC drama When the Boat Comes In. Madelaine starred as Morse's love interest in the Inspector Morse episode "Masonic Mysteries" (1990; series 4, episode 4). Their daughter Kitty Whately is a classical operatic mezzo-soprano, whose career includes performances with the Edinburgh International Festival, the Royal Opera, and English National Opera.

Whately enjoys rock music and plays the guitar; he has cited Pink Floyd and Dire Straits as bands he has particularly enjoyed. He is a fan of Newcastle United on the football field, but says that he prefers rugby league, and as a cricketer admitted to Inspector Morse writer Colin Dexter that he would like to have played cricket professionally for England. Dexter devised the storyline for the Inspector Morse episode "Deceived by Flight" (1989; series 3, episode 3) in which Sergeant Lewis had to go undercover in a cricket team to investigate drug smuggling.

In August 2014, Whately was one of 200 public figures who were signatories to a letter to The Guardian expressing their hope that Scotland would vote to remain part of the United Kingdom in September's independence referendum.

Whately was appointed Officer of the Order of the British Empire (OBE) in the 2025 New Year Honours for services to drama and to charity.

== Filmography ==
=== Film ===
Year	Title	Role	Notes
1980	Hawk the Slayer		
1982	The Return of the Soldier	Hostile soldier's mate	
1996	The English Patient	Hardy	
2000	Paranoid	Clive	
2000	Purely Belter	Mr. Caird	
2006	The Fourth King	Narrator (English version)	Short film

=== Television ===
Year	Title	Role	Notes
1978	Out of the Past		2 episodes
1979	Shoestring	Bobby Treen	Episode: "The Partnership"
1980	BBC2 Playhouse	Bob Smith	Episode: "The Dig"
1980	Fair Stood the Wind for France	Lancaster crew	Mini-series; Episode #1.1
1980	Angels	Norman Pollard	3 episodes
1980	Juliet Bravo	PC Chris Evans	Episode: "Coming Back"
1980	Strangers	Michael Hobb	Episode: "Retribution"
1981	Coronation Street	Kevin	2 episodes
1983	Shackleton	Jameson Adams	Mini-series; Episode: "Our Dead Bodies Must Tell the Tale"
1983–2004	Auf Wiedersehen, Pet	Neville Hope	Main role
1985	Miss Marple	Detective Sergeant Fletcher	3 episodes: "A Murder is Announced"
1987	Carrott Confidential	Himself	Episode #1.2
1987	Alas Smith & Jones		Episode: "Sunday Film: The Sword of St. Petersburg"
1987–2000	Inspector Morse	Detective Sergeant Robert Lewis	Main role
1988	Geordie Racer	Ray Hilton	10 episodes
1988	You Must Be the Husband	Hugo Mansell	Episode: "A Bit Prickly in the Morning"
1990	Screenplay	Neil Baldwin	Episode: "Night Voice"
1991	Jackanory	Storyteller	3 episodes: "Bill's New Frock: Parts 1, 2 & 3"
1991	Aspel & Company	Himself	Episode #8.8
1992	B&B	Steve Shepherd	Mini-series
1993–1995	Peak Practice	Dr. Jack Kerruish	Regular character
1994	Screen Two	Sam Hopkins	Episode: "Skallagrigg"
1994	Q.E.D.	Narrator	Episode: "Food Fights"
1994	An Audience with Ken Dodd	Himself	Uncredited Audience Member
1996	Trip Trap	Ian Armstrong	Television film
1997	Songs of Praise	Himself	1 episode
1997	Gobble	Colin Worsfold	Television film
1997	Light Lunch	Himself	Episode: "Ooh Doctor, I Feel a Bit Peaky"
1997–1998	The Broker's Man	James 'Jimmy' Griffin	Lead role
1999	The People's Passion	Judas	Television special
1999	Pure Wickedness	Geoff Meadows	Main role, 4 episodes
1999	What Katy Did	Dr. Philip Carr	Television film
1999–2003	Hilltop Hospital	Dr. Matthews	Voice role; regular character
2001	Murder in Mind	Nigel Liddy	Episode: "Neighbours"
2001	Merseybeat	Philip Kitchener	2 episodes: "Crying Out Loud" & "What Goes Around"
2002	John Thaw: An Appreciation	Himself	Short television special
2002	The BAFTA TV Awards 2002	Himself	Television special
2002	Plain Jane	David Bruce	Television film
2002	Silent Cry	Dr. Richard Herd	Television film
2002	The John Thaw Story	Himself	Television special documentary
2002	Lads' Army	Narrator	10 episodes
2003	Little Wolf's Book of Badness	Akela	Voice role; short television film
2003	Comic Relief 2003: The Big Hair Do	Neville Hope	Television special
2003	Bible Mysteries	Narrator	Episode: "David and Goliath"
2003	Promoted to Glory	Maj. Nigel Hurst	Television film
2003–2005	GMTV	Himself	3 episodes
2004	Richard & Judy	Himself	1 episode
2004	The Legend of the Tamworth Two	Wolf	Television film
2004	Who Wants to Be a Millionaire	Himself	1 episode
2004	Belonging	Jacob Copplestone	Television film
2004–2011	This Morning	Himself	2 episodes
2005	Dad	Oliver James	Television film
2005	Drama Connections	Himself	Episode: "Auf Wiedersehen, Pet"
2005	ITV 50 Greatest Shows	Himself	Television special
2005	Footprints in the Snow	Kevin Hill	Television film
2005	ITV 50: The Golden Years	Himself	Television film documentary
2006	Today with Des and Mel	Himself	1 episode
2006	New Tricks	Andrew Simson	Episode: "Congratulations"
2006	TV's 50 Greatest Stars	Himself	Television film documentary
2006	Live! Girls! present Dogtown	Bus Driver	BBC3 Comedy, Series 1 Episode 1
2006–2015	Lewis	DI Robert Lewis	Lead role
2007	Lewis... Behind the Scenes	Himself	Television film
2007	There's Something About... Morse	Himself / Det. Insp. Lewis	Television film documentary
2007	The Music of Morse	Narrator	Television film documentary
2007	Kevin Whately: Morse & Me	Himself	Short documentary series
2007	Legends	Himself	Television documentary; Episode: "The Dankworths"
2007	Who Gets the Dog?	Jack Evans	Television film
2008	The Alan Titchmarsh Show	Himself	1 episode
2008	50 Greatest TV Endings	Himself	Television film documentary
2008	Profiling	Himself	Television documentary; Episode: "Colin Dexter"
2008	The Children	Cameron Miller	Mini-series; main role
2009	Who Do You Think You Are?	Himself	Television documentary; 1 episode
2009	Top of the Cops	Himself / DS/DI Robert Lewis	Television film documentary
2009–2016	Masterpiece Mystery!	Inspector Lewis	10 episodes
2010	Breakfast	Himself	1 episode
2010	Joe Maddison's War	Joe Maddison	Television film
2011	The A to Z of Crime	Himself / DI Robert Lewis	Television documentary; Episode: "U to Z"
2012	The Unforgettable John Thaw	Himself	Television film documentary
2012	Inspector George Gently	Donald McGhee	Episode: "Gently in the Cathedral"
2013	The Railway: Keeping Britain on Track	Narrator	Television documentary series
2013	Richard Briers: A Tribute	Himself	Television film documentary
2013	The Crime Thriller Club	Himself	Television documentary series; Episode #1.3
2015	The Sound of ITV: The Nation's Favourite Theme Tunes	Himself / Lewis	Television film documentary
2015	Lorraine	Himself	1 episode
2016	Pointless Celebrities	Himself	Episode: "Law and Order"
2016	Still Game	Cameron Hastie	Episode: "Job"
2016–2017	Ant & Dec's Saturday Night Takeaway	Himself	6 episodes
2017	Who Shot Simon Cowell?	DI Robert Lewis	Television film
2017–2019	Island Medics	Narrator	Television documentary series
2023	Midsomer Murders	Jeremy Whittingdale	Episode: "For Death Prepare"
2025	Vera	Gary Creelan	Episode: "Inside"

=== Stage ===
Year	Title	Role	Theatre	Notes
	Whistling Milestones		Edinburgh Festival Fringe	
	Tunes of Glory		Royal Lyceum Theatre / Scottish Tour	
	The Foursome	Harry	Warehouse Theatre	
	Raffles	Charles Lamb	Far Eastern Tour	
	Accounts	Andy Mawson	Edinburgh / Riverside Studios	
	Operation Elvis	Elvis	Tricycle Theatre	
	Bad Language	Phil	Hampstead Theatre	
	Henry IV	Prince Hal	Tyne Theatre	
	Billy Liar	Title Role	National Tour	
	She Stoops to Conquer	Tony Lumpkin	Oxford Playhouse	
	Three Piece Suite	Keith Bishop	Queen's Theatre	
	The Crucible	John Proctor	Leicester Haymarket	
	Our Own Kind	Daines	Bush Theatre	
1989	The Widowing of Mrs Holroyd	Blackmore	Leicester Haymarket	
1996	Twelve Angry Men	Juror 8	Bristol Old Vic / Comedy Theatre	
1997	Snake in the Grass	Ray Lucas	Old Vic Theatre	
1998	How I Learned to Drive	Uncle Peck	Donmar Warehouse	
2013	White Rabbit Red Rabbit		Live Theatre	
2015	Gypsy	Herbie	Chichester Festival Theatre	
2015	Arthur	Arthur	Theatre Royal Haymarket	
