= Mr. Fezziwig =

Fezziwig
- A Christmas Carol character
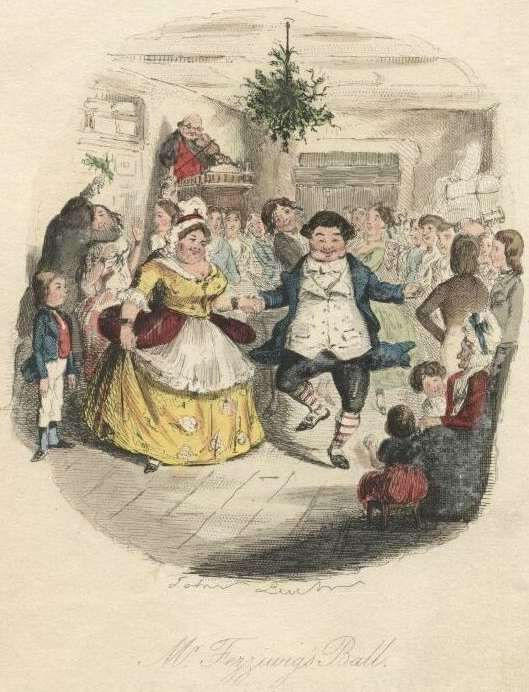
- Fezziwig dances with his workers, illustration by John Leech
- First appearance: A Christmas Carol 1843
- Created by: Charles Dickens
- Portrayed by: Forrester Harvey; Roddy Hughes; Dick Elliott; Bryan Herbert; Paul Frees; Laurence Naismith; Paul Whitsun-Jones; Timothy Bateson; Pui Fan Lee; Fozzie Bear (Frank Oz); Ian McNeice; Brian Bedford; Bob Hoskins; Luca Mantle; James Cosmo; Riley Locke

In-universe information
- Family: The Fezziwigs
- Nationality: English

Fezziwig is a character from the 1843 novella A Christmas Carol created by Charles Dickens to provide contrast with Ebenezer Scrooge's attitudes towards business ethics. Scrooge was apprenticed under Fezziwig. Despite this, the older Scrooge seems to be the very antithesis of Mr. Fezziwig in appearance, actions, and characterisation. Mr. Fezziwig is portrayed as a jovial, virtuous, old-fashioned man with a large Welsh Wig.

In Stave 2 of A Christmas Carol, the Ghost of Christmas Past takes Scrooge to revisit his youthful days in Fezziwig's world on the cusp of the Industrial Revolution. Dickens uses Fezziwig to represent communal values and a way of life quickly swept away in the economic turmoil of the early nineteenth century.

== Character ==
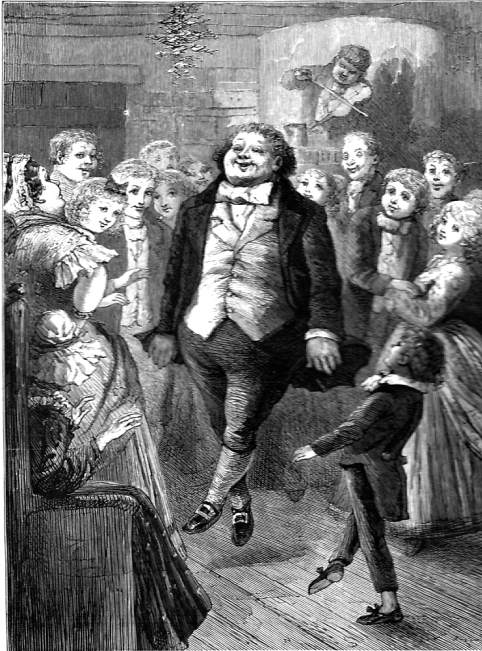
Fezziwig, as envisioned by Sol Eytinge Jr., 1843

Scrooge, a very mean person who does not care about anything but himself and money, diverges greatly from the character of the people under whom he apprenticed and whom he once admired. Fezziwig, though an early adopter of industrial capitalism, moderates profit maximization with kindness, generosity, and affection for his employees. In the early 19th century, such small owner-controlled traders were being swept up. When Scrooge sees Fezziwig in the vision, he is elated to see him "alive again". Scrooge shows a further awakening of forgotten affection for Fezziwig when the Spirit asks:

"A small matter," said the Ghost, "to make these silly folks so full of gratitude."

The Spirit signed to him to listen to the two apprentices, who were pouring out their hearts in praise of Fezziwig: and when he had done so, said,

"Why! Is it not? He has spent but a few pounds of your mortal money: three or four perhaps. Is that so much that he deserves this praise?"

"It isn't that," said Scrooge, heated by the remark, and speaking unconsciously like his former, not his latter, self. "It isn't that, Spirit. He has the power to render us happy or unhappy; to make our service light or burdensome; a pleasure or a toil. Say that his power lies in words and looks; in things so slight and insignificant that it is impossible to add and count 'em up: what then? The happiness he gives, is quite as great as if it cost a fortune."

He felt the Spirit's glance, and stopped.

Scrooge realises he has considered the benefits of being a good and generous employer, as Fezziwig was, and comes to regret mistreating his clerk, Bob Cratchit.

== Notable portrayals ==
Several adaptions show Fezziwig's Christmas party as the setting for where Scrooge first met Belle, whom he fell in love with and became engaged to. Some adaptions such as Scrooge (1970) (where Fezziwig is played by Laurence Naismith), and the 2017 stage version even depict Belle (renamed as Isabel for the former adaptation) as being one of Fezziwig's daughters. In the 1951 film Scrooge, Fezziwig is advised to bend with the times and sell out:

Jorkin: "Mr. Fezziwig, we're good friends besides good men of business. We're men of vision and progress. Why don't you sell out while the going's good? You'll never get a better offer. It's the age of the machine, and the factory, and the vested interests. We small traders are ancient history, Mr. Fezziwig."

Fezziwig: "It's not just for money alone that one spends a lifetime building up a business…. It's to preserve a way of life that one knew and loved. No, I can't see my way to selling out to the new vested interests, Mr. Jorkin. I'll have to be loyal to the old ways and die out with them if needs must."

Ultimately, Jorkin hires away Scrooge and buys out Fezziwig's business, moving it from private to shareholder ownership. As Fezziwig sadly watches, Scrooge notices him in the carriage, and seems to wade towards him as though to give explanations but, with an expression of guilt, walks away. As agent of shareholder interests, Jorkin and his managers Scrooge and Jacob Marley are constrained from diverging from the goals of profitability, making it more difficult to be a Fezziwig even if they were inclined to. Fezziwig's successor, Jorkin, demonstrates the weakness of self-interest when he announces to the board of directors that the company is insolvent after years of embezzling. Scrooge and Marley demonstrate their cunning self-interest by using the crisis to attain a controlling interest in the company. In Scrooge, these new managers replacing the Fezziwigs are predatory towards shareholders and employees alike, the product of a process and a mindset that Dickens felt was at odds with humanity.

- Fezziwig appears in the 1983 animated featurette, Mickey's Christmas Carol, portrayed in a non-speaking role by Mr. Toad and the name spelled as "Fezzywig".
- In the 1992 film The Muppet Christmas Carol, he is played by Fozzie Bear and called "Fozziwig". Unlike his book counterpart, Fozziwig is still alive and is given a gift by Scrooge following his redemption.
- In the 1999 TV film A Christmas Carol, he is portrayed by Ian McNeice.
- In the 2004 musical A Christmas Carol, Fezziwig (played by Brian Bedford)—following a downturn in his business—approaches Scrooge and Marley for a business loan. Scrooge, starting to turn into his greedy self, refuses the request, stating that he (Scrooge) and Marley would be throwing good money after bad.
- The Boston Brewing Company produces Old Fezziwig Ale, a winter seasonal beer named after the character.
- Called "Fezzywig" in Christmas Karma (2025), this modern day adaptation also includes a scene where Eshaan Sood (an Indian version of Scrooge) refuses to help him when the latter falls on hard times.
