= Ben Mosley =

English painter

Ben Mosley (born 9 August 1981) is a British expressionist artist whose work is based on architectural and sporting themes. He specialises in live painting and produces bespoke paintings at high-profile events around the world. He is currently the official artist for Team GB and Artist in Residence at Wembley Stadium. Mosley was also appointed as the official artist of The British & Irish Lions for Australia 2025. Mosley travelled with the British & Irish Lions and created paintings live during the tour in Australia in Brisbane, Melbourne and Sydney. It was a successful tour which the Lions won, defeating the wallabies in Melbourne in dramatic fashion.

From Baldock in Hertfordshire, Mosley was educated at The Knights Templar School in his home town of Baldock. He took a BTEC Diploma Art Foundation course at the University of Hertfordshire (1998–1999) and a BA Honours Fine Art Degree at the University of Liverpool (2000–2003). Mosley specialises in live painting, and is considered to be one of Great Britains leading artists in that genre. He uses lots of real 24k gold in his work and creates paintings from a blank canvas to completion at high-profile sporting events and charitable dinners in a matter of hours in front of live audiences. His live painting at high-profile black tie dinners with celebrities such as Ed Sheeran have seen him raise large sums for various charities over the last decade. His record sale being 100k to date. Mosley is also an accomplished muralist, having completed murals for Team GB and Wembley Stadium. His largest mural to date resides at Barnsley Football Club, which stretches 60metres down the south stand concourse at Oakwell Stadium. He has received commissions from many leading organisations connected within sport including Wembley Stadium, Manchester United, and McDonald's (for whom he created his artwork 'Fans of the World' which was transferred on to McDonald's iconic fries packaging in a global promotions seen by an estimated 60 million people worldwide), the London Olympics, and The Emirates and Creek Golf clubs in Dubai. His most famous commission to date was by Hello! Magazine, When he was officially commissioned in 2022 to create a painting of her late majesty Queen Elizabeth 11 in celebration of her platinum Jubilee. Collectors and supporters of his work include Mike Tindall and Zara Tindall, Ed Sheeran, Sir Alex Ferguson, Wayne Rooney, José Mourinho and Hollywood director Jerry Weintraub. Mosley's work can be found in many private collections around the world.

Mosley's first exhibition as a professional artist was at the Manchester Art Show in 2003 since then he has had solo exhibitions at various venues in London and has shown his work at the coveted Saatchi Gallery in 2022 and 2023. He was the first artist to paint a mural at Wembley Stadium which was designed to show the transition from the old Wembley Stadium to the new Wembley Stadium depicting the ground's history from 1923 and which covers an area of 20m. As Artist in Residence at the home of football, Mosley has forty paintings displayed in a permanent collection at Club Wembley. Mosley is currently the official artist for Team GB, having created a live medal moments mural in Carnaby street in London celebrating every medal won by Team GB at the Tokyo Olympics. During the Paris 2024 Olympic Games, he completed a bespoke collection of Olympic paintings in Team GB house in front of a live audience in Paris celebrating every medal won by Team GB. Mosley based the paintings on the colours of the Olympic rings, they were titled Olympic Blue, Olympic Yellow, Olympic Black, Olympic Green and Olympic Red, painted in real time and containing 24k gold. He also completed a live painting at the opening ceremony capturing Team GB on the River Seine. During the Winter Olympics Milano Cortina 2026, Mosley created a live painting celebrating every Olympic medal won by Team GB from 1924 to 2026.
