= Who Gets the Dog? (2007 film) =

2007 British television film

- Genre: Comedy drama
- Created by: Guy Hibbert
- Directed by: Nicholas Renton
- Starring: Kevin Whately; Alison Steadman; Stephen Mangan; Emma Pierson; Sinead Matthews; Hayley Nolan
- Country of origin: United Kingdom

Production
- Producer: Emma Burge
- Production locations: Isle of Man; London
- Running time: 120 mins
- Production companies: Company Pictures (an All3Media company); Isle of Man Film

Original release
- Network: ITV

Who Gets the Dog? is a one-off British television comedy-drama starring Kevin Whately, Alison Steadman, Stephen Mangan, and Emma Pierson. It was written by Guy Hibbert and directed by Nicholas Renton and premiered on ITV on Sunday 2 December 2007 at 9pm.

== Plot summary ==
Jack and Jenny Evans have been married for 27 years but have hit a rough patch in their marriage, as Jack has been having an affair with coworker Pamela. The two decide to split despite the protestations of their daughter and both hire lawyers to represent them. During a meeting the two lawyers, Steve Hollister and Tara Walker, find that they have a mutual attraction to one another. They also get a perverse sense of joy out of dragging out the divorce proceedings, especially as this means that they can bill for more hours. Jack and Jenny continue to argue, particularly as each wants to take custody of the family dog, Bounder.

Ultimately Steve and Tara's plot is uncovered by their superiors and foiled. Jack breaks up with Pamela and reunites with Jenny, much to their daughter's joy.

== Cast ==
- Kevin Whately as Jack Evans
- Alison Steadman as Jenny Evans
- Stephen Mangan as Steve Hollister
- Emma Pierson as Tara Walker
- Sinead Matthews as Claire Evans
- Deborah Findlay as Pamela Wilson
- David Gillespie as Clive Collingwood
- Luke Mably as Hugo Delaney-Jones
- Martin Hutson as Oliver Steinberg
- Judy Flynn as Sue Sullivan
- Badi Uzzaman as Harry Singh

== Production ==
Emma Pierson commented on playing a villainous character, as she felt that "Playing a character like Tara is a way of unleashing the demons, being able to say things and behave in a way you wouldn't in real life. I like playing girls on screen who are tougher than me, so I don't have to be them in reality." Filming took place on the Isle of Man.

== Release ==
Who Gets the Dog? premiered on ITV on Sunday 2 December 2007 at 9pm.

== Reception ==
Critical reception for Who Gets the Dog? was predominantly negative, with The Munster Express calling the film a "train wreck" and The Telegraph joking that they "feel sorry for any lawyers watching". The Guardian heavily criticized the film as "a truly terrible programme. While the writing either plodded or cartwheeled, the performances swung between adequate and desperate." The Independent was similarly critical, writing "It's the phrase "comedy drama" that is problematic, given a script that begins with attritional marital row and proceeds by way of nervous breakdowns, suicide attempts and cruel professional cynicism, to a rueful and unconvincing "happy" ending."
