= B&B (TV series) =

- Country of origin: United Kingdom
- Original language: English
- No. of series: 1

Production
- Running time: 43-44 minutes
- Production company: Thames Television

Original release
- Network: ITV (CITV)
- Release: 1992

B&B is a British television children's programme, broadcast in 1992, following the lives of a father and daughter and their struggle to make their newly established bed and breakfast business work.

Produced by Thames Television, the show was originally broadcast on CITV and starred Kevin Whately, better known for his performance as Lewis in Inspector Morse, and the Scottish actress Katy Murphy.

== Plot ==
The series started with Steve Shepherd, played by Whately, being fired from his job in a local architectural firm for disagreeing with his boss' (Ian McNeice) blueprints for a local amusement arcade. Unemployed and with a daughter, Alice (Alexandra Milman), to care for, Shepherd decides to turn his large home into a B&B for financial support. Shepherd's former boss, Horace Gilbert, becomes aware after his dismissal that Shepherd's house lies right in the middle of his proposed development site and that the removal of his former employee and his home is needed to go ahead with construction. Meanwhile, Shepherd's B&B is doing well and one of his guests, Billie Golden, a street busker (played by Katy Murphy), reveals to him that she has no money and cannot pay her bill. In an attempt to help her, Shepherd offers her continued room and board for an unpaid working position at the B&B.

When Gilbert's legitimate attempts to remove Shepherd from his house fail he moves onto Billie, offering her her dream motorbike in return for flooding the B&B and rendering it uninhabitable. When this backfires, he decides to resort to arson and attempts to burn the property to the ground. However, his secretary finds out what he is planning and realises he has gone too far. She reports him to the police and he is arrested in the act.
