= Sammy Dobson =

English actress (born 1986)

- Born: Sammy Tinkerbell Dobson; November 27, 1986 (age 39); Newcastle upon Tyne, England
- Occupations: Actress; comedian
- Years active: 2001–present
- Known for: Casualty

Sammy Tinkerbell Dobson (born 26 November 1986) is an English actress. Born in Newcastle-upon-Tyne, she appeared as Sarah Young in the children's drama series Byker Grove from 2004 to 2005. She was subsequently in episodes of several British television shows, including Casualty, Inspector George Gently and Doctors.

From 2007 to 2009, Dobson was a regular member of the team as part of the zoo format Stephen Merchant show on BBC 6Music. In 2010 she starred in the ITV TV movie Joe Maddison's War, as well as having roles in the films Public Sex (2009) and Almost Married (2014). She had an appearance alongside Peter Andre in an advert for supermarket chain Iceland. In 2016, she had a recurring role in the sitcom Boy Meets Girl, and had a minor part in the film I, Daniel Blake.

Dobson began trying comedy aged 23, being inspired to do so having survived a serious car accident. She has since performed sketch and stand-up comedy around Newcastle, and visited the Edinburgh Fringe Festival in 2015 and 2016. In 2016, she launched a podcast, entitled Which Is The Best?, alongside fellow Tyneside comedian Lee Kyle.

In 2024, Dobson was cast as junior doctor Nicole Piper in BBC's Casualty.
