= Red Lion =

Red Lion, Red Lions, Red Lyon, Red Lion Inn and variations, may refer to:

== Arts and entertainment ==
- Red Lion (film), a 1969 Japanese film
- Red Lion (theatre), an Elizabethan playhouse in London
- The Red Lion, a 1946 novel by Mária Szepes
- The Red Lion, a 2015 play by Patrick Marber
- Red Lion, a robot vehicle from the animated television series Voltron
- "Le Lion rouge", the national anthem of Senegal

== Businesses and organisations ==
- Red Lion (St. Paul's Churchyard) (aka Red Lyon), a historical bookseller in London
- Red Lion Area School District, York County, Pennsylvania, U.S.
- Red Lion Broadcasting, the subject of Red Lion Broadcasting Co. v. FCC, a U.S. Supreme Court decision
- Red Lion Hotel, Cromer, England
- Red Lion Hotels Corporation, an American company
  - Red Lion Hotels
- Red Lion and Sun Society, the former name of the Red Crescent in Iran
- Red Lions (political party), a defunct political party in Belgium
- Red Lion Inn (Brooklyn), New York, U.S.
- Red Lion Inn (Stockbridge, Massachusetts), U.S.

=== Pubs ===
- Red Lion, a popular pub name: Pub names in Great Britain → Heraldry → Red Lion
- Old Red Lion, Holborn, London, England
- Red Lion, Ampney St Peter, Gloucestershire, England
- Red Lion, Belfast, Northern Ireland, subject of the 1971 Red Lion Pub bombing
- Red Lion, Duke of York Street, St James's, London
- Red Lion, Great Windmill Street, London
- Red Lion, Handsworth, Birmingham, England
- Red Lion, Hillingdon, London
- Red Lion, Oxford, Oxfordshire, England
- Red Lion, Snargate, Kent, England
- Red Lion, Westminster, London
- Red Lion, Withington, Manchester, England
- Red Lion Inn, Philadelphia, U.S.
- Red Lion Inn, Shoreham-by-Sea, West Sussex, England
- The Red Lion, Chipping Barnet, London
- The Red Lion, Hatfield, Hertfordshire, England
- The Red Lion, Preston, Hertfordshire
- The Red Lion, Skipton, North Yorkshire, England
- The Red Lion, Southampton, Hampshire, England
- The Red Lion, York, North Yorkshire

== Places ==
=== United States ===
- Red Lion Airport, Burlington County, New Jersey
- Red Lion, Delaware
- Red Lion Creek, Delaware
- Red Lion Hundred, New Castle County, Delaware
- Red Lion Inn (Stockbridge, Massachusetts)
- Red Lion, Burlington County, New Jersey
- Red Lion, Middlesex County, New Jersey
- Red Lion, Ohio
- Red Lion, York County, Pennsylvania
  - Red Lion Borough Historic District

=== Elsewhere ===
- Red Lion, Victoria, Australia
- Red Lion Hill, Powys, Wales
- FOB Red Lion, a former U.S. Army Forward Operating Base in Camp Ashraf, Iraq

== Sport ==
- Qingdao Red Lions F.C., a Chinese football club
- Red Lions (field hockey), the Belgian national field hockey team
- Red Lions FC (Liberia), a Liberian football club
- Red Lions FC (Malawi), a Malawian football club
- San Beda Red Lions, varsity teams of San Beda University in the Philippines
  - San Beda Red Lions basketball, basketball team

== Other uses ==
- Den Røde Løve (Danish ship)
- The US Army 119th Field Artillery Regiment, Red Lions
- USMC Tiltrotor Squadron 363, Lucky Red Lions
- Red Lions, the Singapore Armed Forces Parachute Team

== See also ==
- Flag of Luxembourg
- Lion (heraldry)
- Old Red Lion (disambiguation)
- Red lionfish
- Royal Standard of the United Kingdom
- Royal Banner of Scotland
