= Red Lion, New Jersey =

Red Lion is the name of some places in the U.S. state of New Jersey:

- Red Lion, Burlington County, New Jersey
- Red Lion, Middlesex County, New Jersey

See also

- Red Lion (disambiguation)
