= Mitre Inn, Chipping Barnet =

Pub in Barnet, London

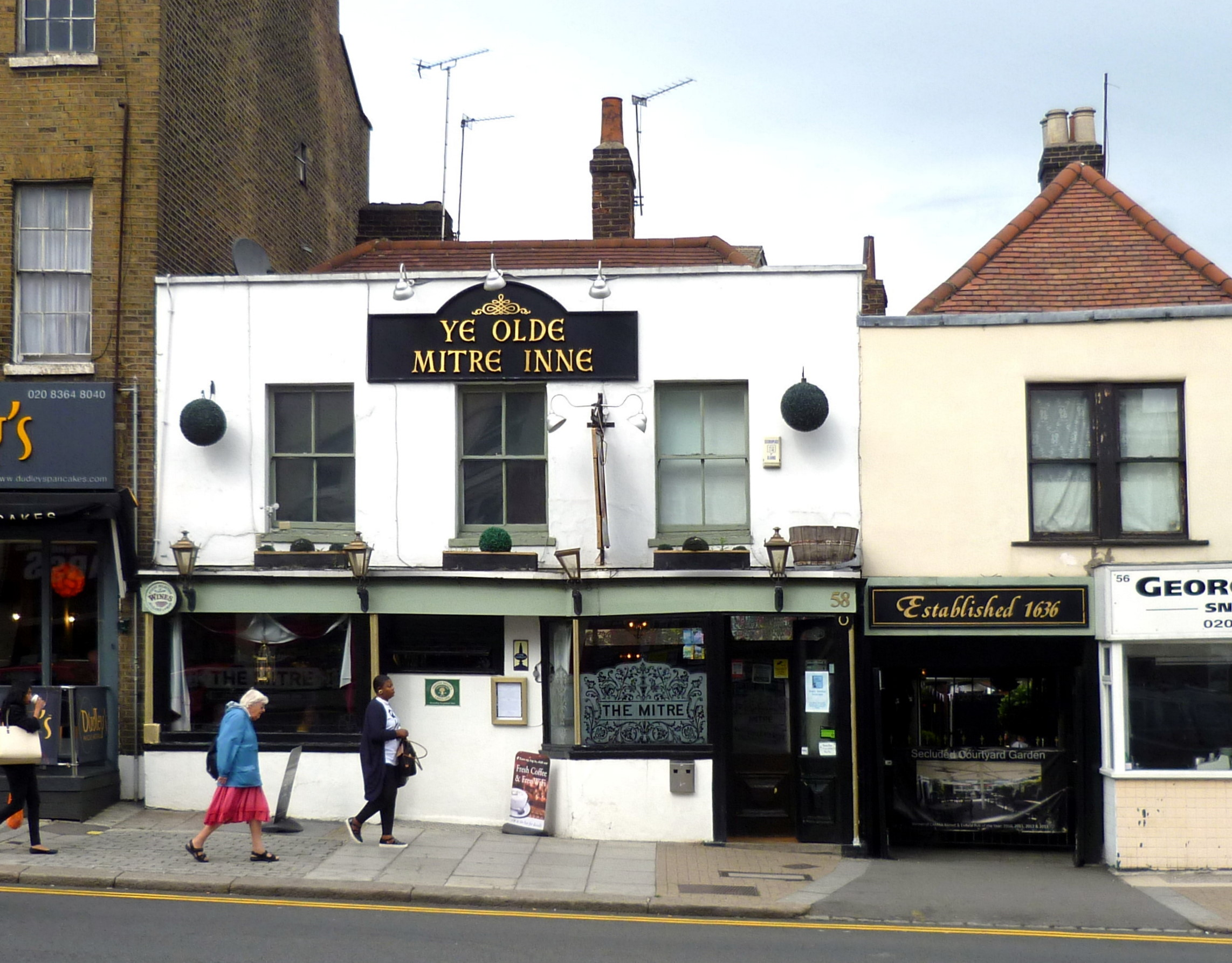
- The Mitre Inn

- Location within London Borough of Barnet Location within Greater London

General information
- Location: 58 High Street, Chipping Barnet, London, England
- Coordinates: 51°39′10.67″N 0°12′5.1″W
- Construction started: 1636

Design and construction
- Designations

Listed Building – Grade II
- Official name: Mitre Inn Public House
- Designated: 7 April 1983
- Reference no.: 1287050

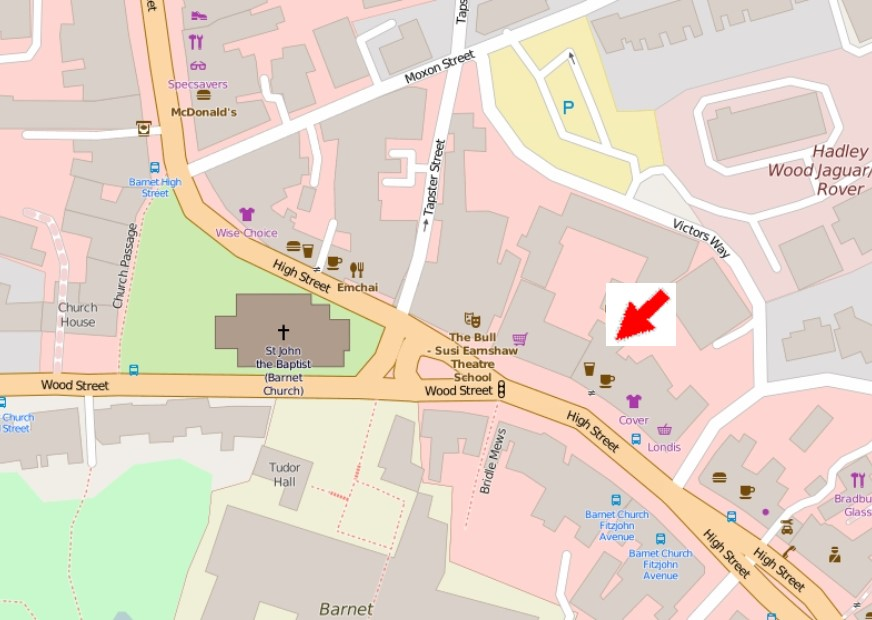
Location of the Mitre Inn (arrowed)

The Mitre Inn is a public house at 58 High Street, Chipping Barnet, London. It was established by 1633 and is probably the oldest remaining of the town's once numerous coaching inns. It is a grade II listed building with Historic England and is currently styled "Ye Olde Mitre Inne".

== Background ==
The development of Chipping Barnet after the Middle Ages is attributable to the granting of a charter for a cattle and horse market by Queen Elizabeth I in 1588, after which Barnet Fair came to dominate the meat trade in London, and the town's position on the Great North Road, of which its High Street forms a part. The town became so famous for its coaching inns that it acquired the nickname of the "Town of Inns".

== History ==
In 1633, there were three inns adjacent to each other on the east side of the High Street: the Rose (kept by Robert Briscoe), the Crown, and a wine tavern known as the Man. In 1663, they joined to become the Man and Rose and Crown. In 1667, the inn became The Rose and Crown and Mitre, and simply the Mitre soon after. The Mitre primarily catered for the large number of stage coaches that passed through Chipping Barnet each day and a War Office survey of 1756 reported that it could provide 12 beds and stabling for 26 horses.

The name "Mitre" has traditionally been used to suggest affinity with the established church and the Mitre Inn is overlooked by Chipping Barnet's St John the Baptist Church (1560) in the diocese of Diocese of St Albans. Vestry accounts record that in 1720 ten shillings was spent at the Mitre entertaining the Archdeacon of St Albans plus sixpence for a new chamberpot.

In 1774, Samuel Johnson called at the Mitre, accompanied by Mrs Thrale, when the innkeeper was James O'Connor. In 1785, the inn was described as "new built" with "stabling for upwards of one hundred horses", and in 1790 as having "roomy conveniences for carriages". By 1817, 150 coaches a day were passing through Chipping Barnet, but the meat trade had already shifted from Barnet to more central areas of London and after the coach trade declined too with the development of the railways in the mid nineteenth century, the Mitre became a public house rather than the larger establishment typical of a coaching inn.

Later licensees of the Mitre included Conner in the 1780s, F.W. Sedgewick a brewer from Watford before 1885, and A. Conquer in 1895.

== Legends ==
In February 1660, General Monck is supposed to have stayed at the Mitre Inn on his way to London to restore Charles II to the throne, after the Commonwealth.

According to the Mitre's own legend, a bet was placed at the Barnet horse fair that a horse could not be ridden backwards up Barnet Hill, at the top of which the pub is located, but the rider was not able to collect his money as he was dismounted from his horse and killed after colliding with the pub's sign.

== Today ==
Today, the Mitre is styled "Ye Olde Mitre Inne". It occupies a much smaller plot than in its coaching heyday but is probably the oldest remaining of the town's once numerous coaching inns and a grade II listed building with Historic England. It retains its timber frame but has been refronted and stuccoed. Its etched windows were added in the twentieth century. The land at the rear, once used for stabling, has long since been turned to other uses. An archaeological investigation of that area was carried out in 2005.

== Gallery ==
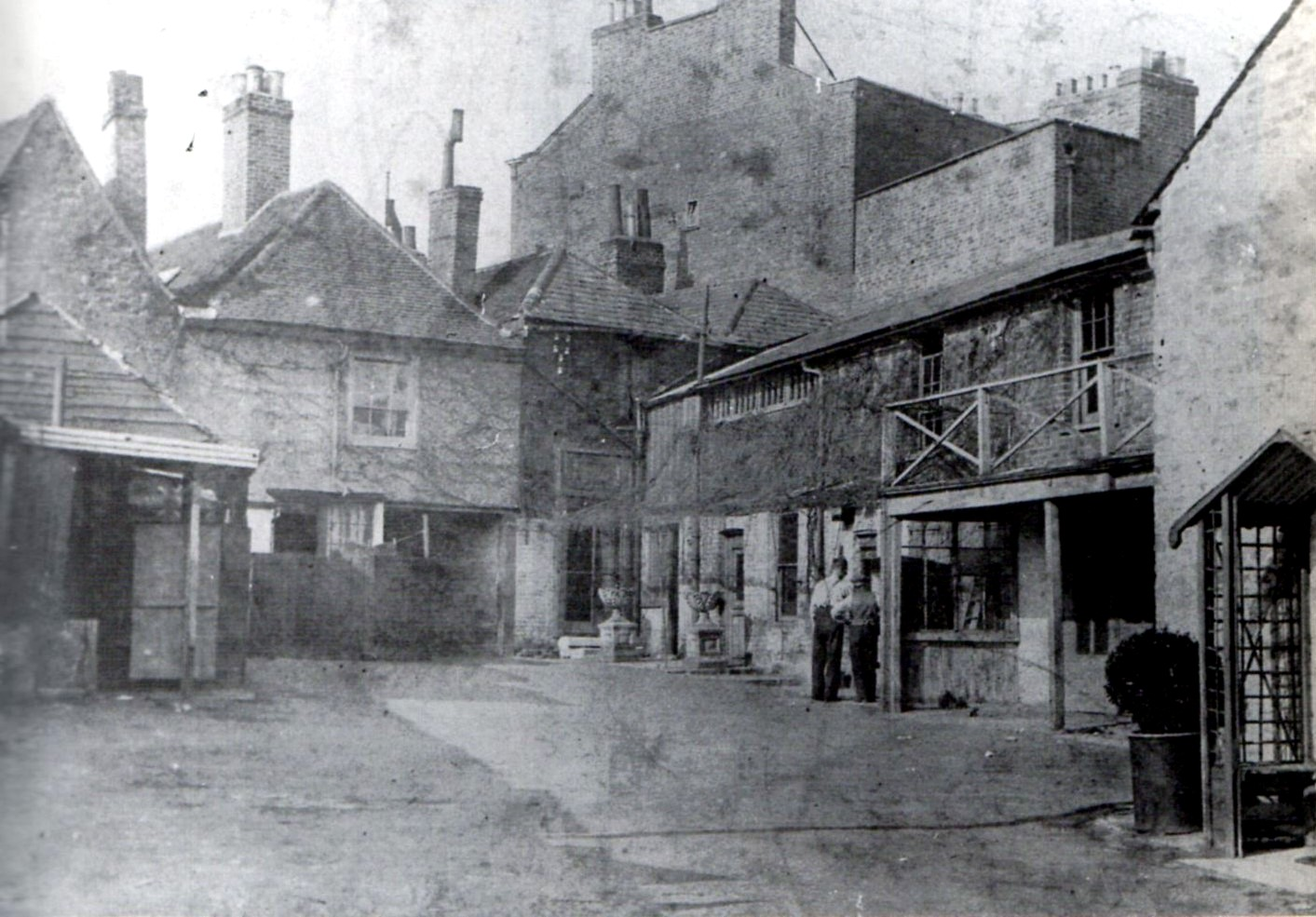
The Mitre Inn yard, 1900

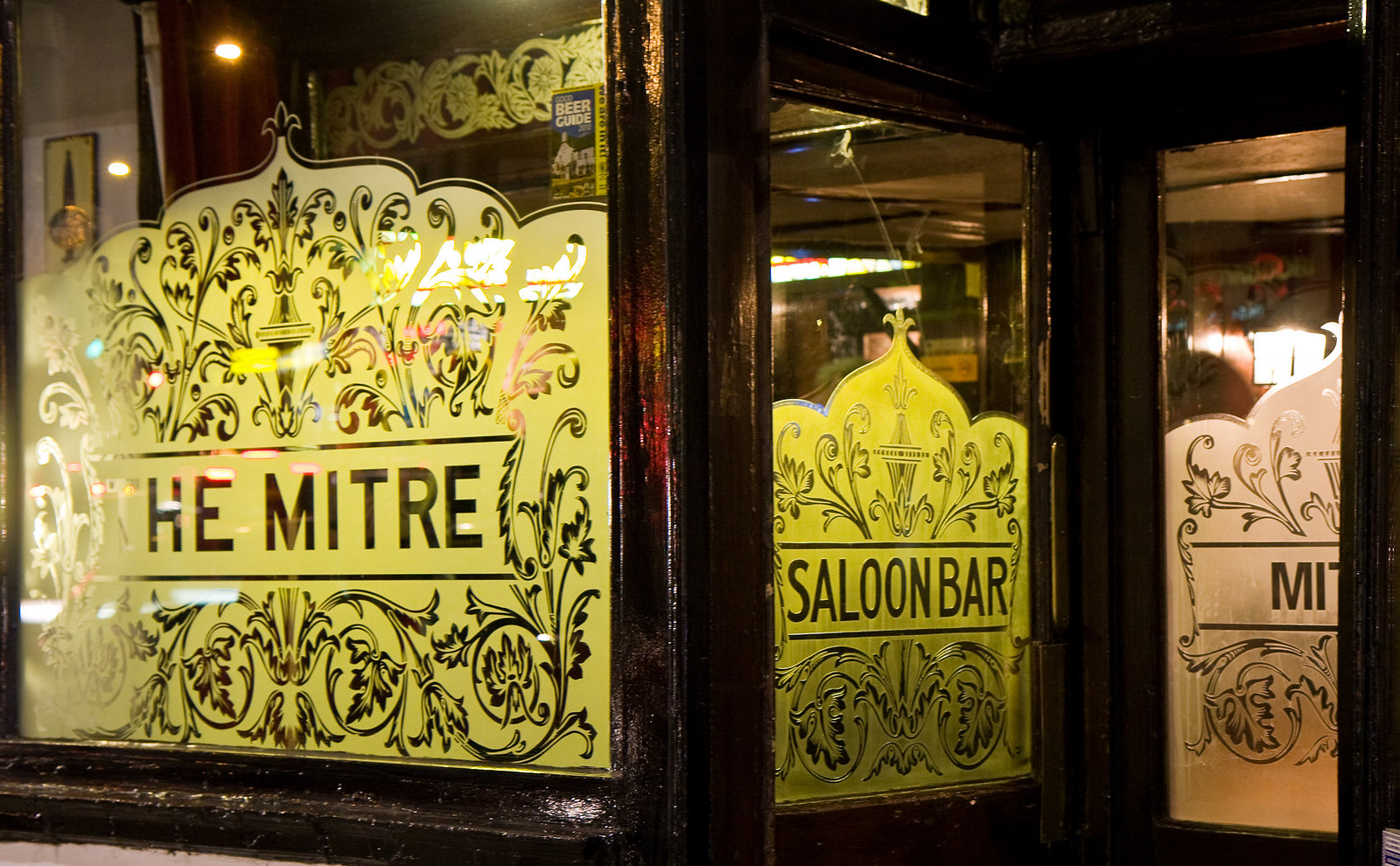
Etched window decorations

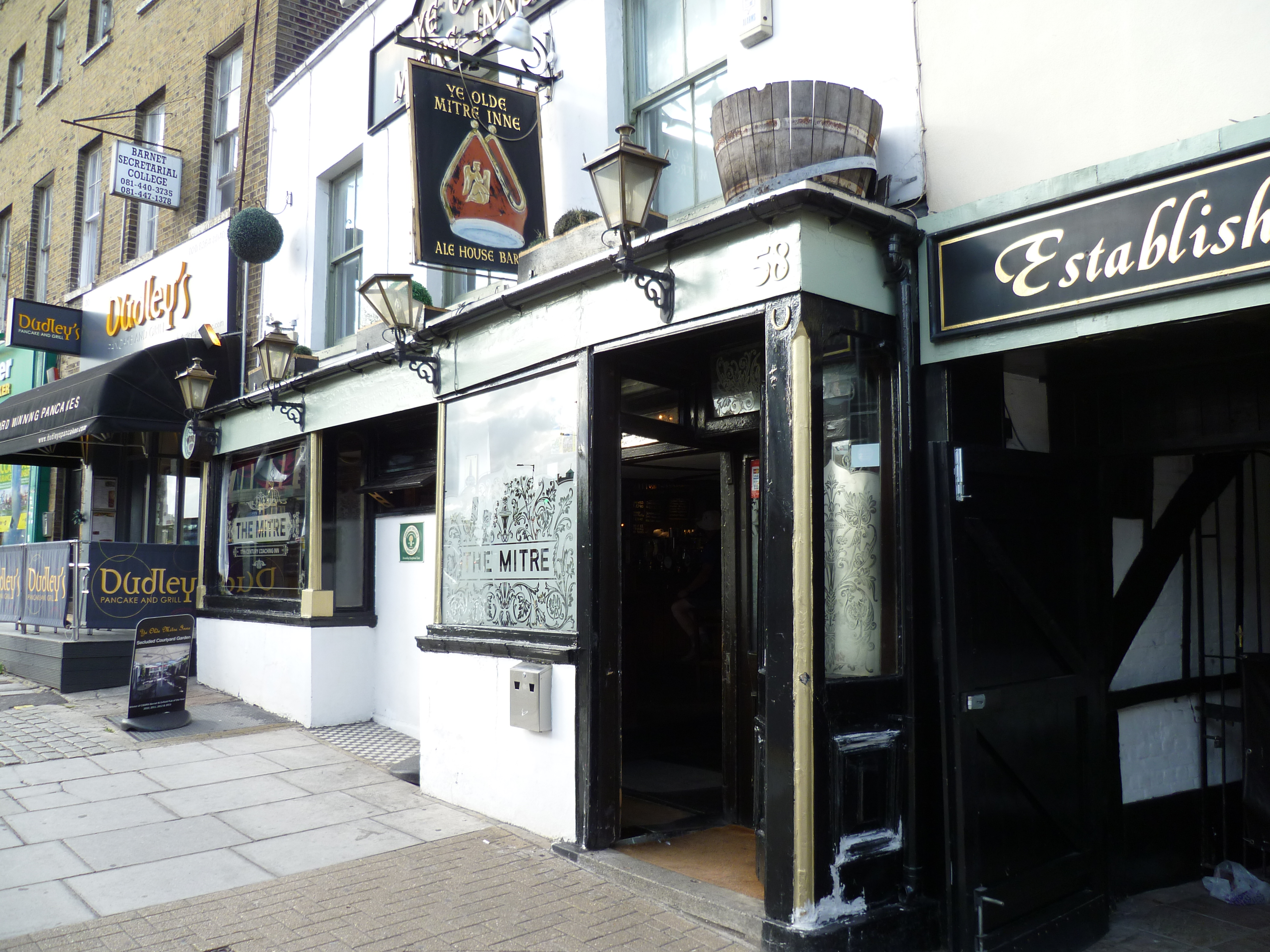
The Mitre Inn

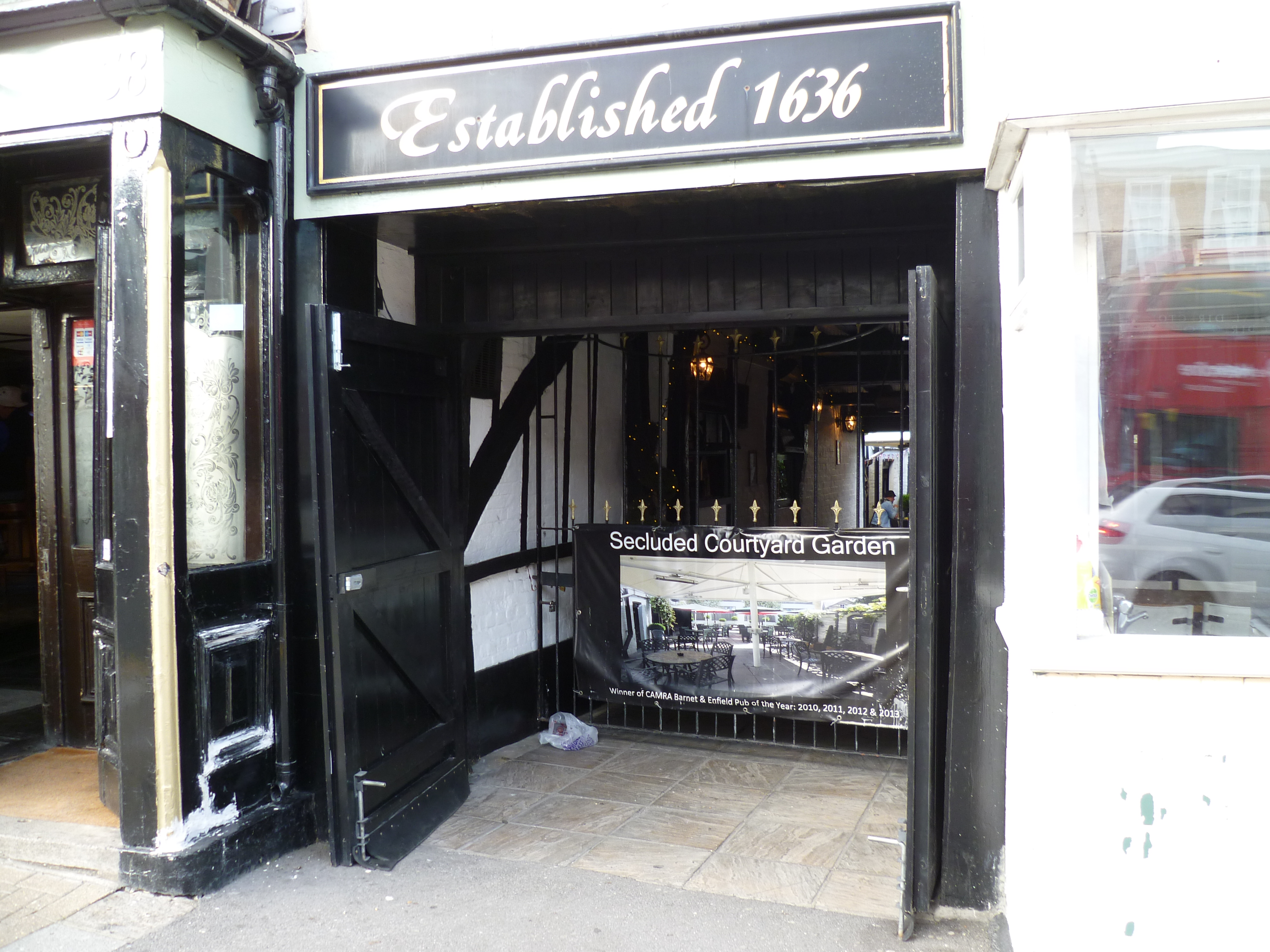
The Mitre Inn

== See also ==
- The Red Lion, Chipping Barnet
