= Oliver Cromwell's head =

Severed head of the English statesman

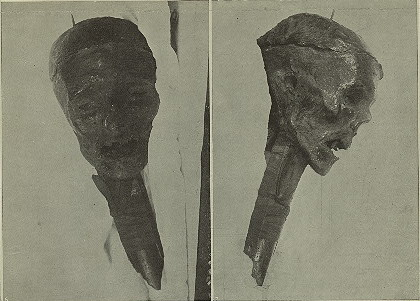
- Photographs of Cromwell's head, 1911.
- Present location: Buried at Sidney Sussex College, Cambridge

Oliver Cromwell's head was severed from his body in 1661, three years after his death and burial. The head was placed on a 20-foot (6.1 m) pole and displayed on the roof of Westminster Hall until at least 1684. Cromwell's body had been removed from Westminster Abbey, where it had been buried since he had died on 3 September 1658 of natural causes. Cromwell had been Lord Protector, the ruler of the Commonwealth of England, after the defeat and the beheading of King Charles I after the Second English Civil War. On his death, Cromwell was given a public funeral at Westminster Abbey as elaborate as those of the monarchs who had ruled before him. His position passed to his son Richard, but Richard was overthrown shortly thereafter, leading to the re-establishment of the monarchy under King Charles II, who had been living in exile in continental Europe.

In January 1661, after Charles II's reinstatement, his new parliament ordered the disinterment of Cromwell's body, as well as those of John Bradshaw and Henry Ireton, for posthumous execution at Tyburn. The three bodies were left hanging at Tyburn "from morning till four in the afternoon" (Note: near sunset) before being cut down and beheaded, with Cromwell's head being impaled at Westminster Hall, which had been the location of the trial of Charles I.

Although the head's whereabouts from 1684 to 1710 is uncertain, tradition says that on a stormy night in the late 1680s, it was blown from the top of Westminster Hall, thrown to the ground, and picked up by a sentry who carried it home. (Note: Other sources list the date of the event anywhere between 1672 and 1703 (Cromwell Association 2011).) After its disappearance from Westminster, it was in the hands of various private collectors and museums until 25 March 1960, when it was buried at Sidney Sussex College in Cambridge, Cromwell's alma mater.

The symbolic value of the head changed over time. Originally, it was displayed as an act of revenge by Charles II, and a warning to all who saw it, but by the 18th century it had become a historical curiosity and a relic. The head has variously been admired, reviled and dismissed as a fake. Thomas Carlyle dismissed it as "fraudulent moonshine", and scientific and archaeological analysis was carried out to test the identity after the emergence of a rival claimant to be the true head of Oliver Cromwell. Inconclusive tests culminated in a detailed scientific study by Karl Pearson and Geoffrey Morant, which concluded that there was a "moral certainty" that the head was Oliver Cromwell's, based on a study of the head and other evidence.

== Background ==
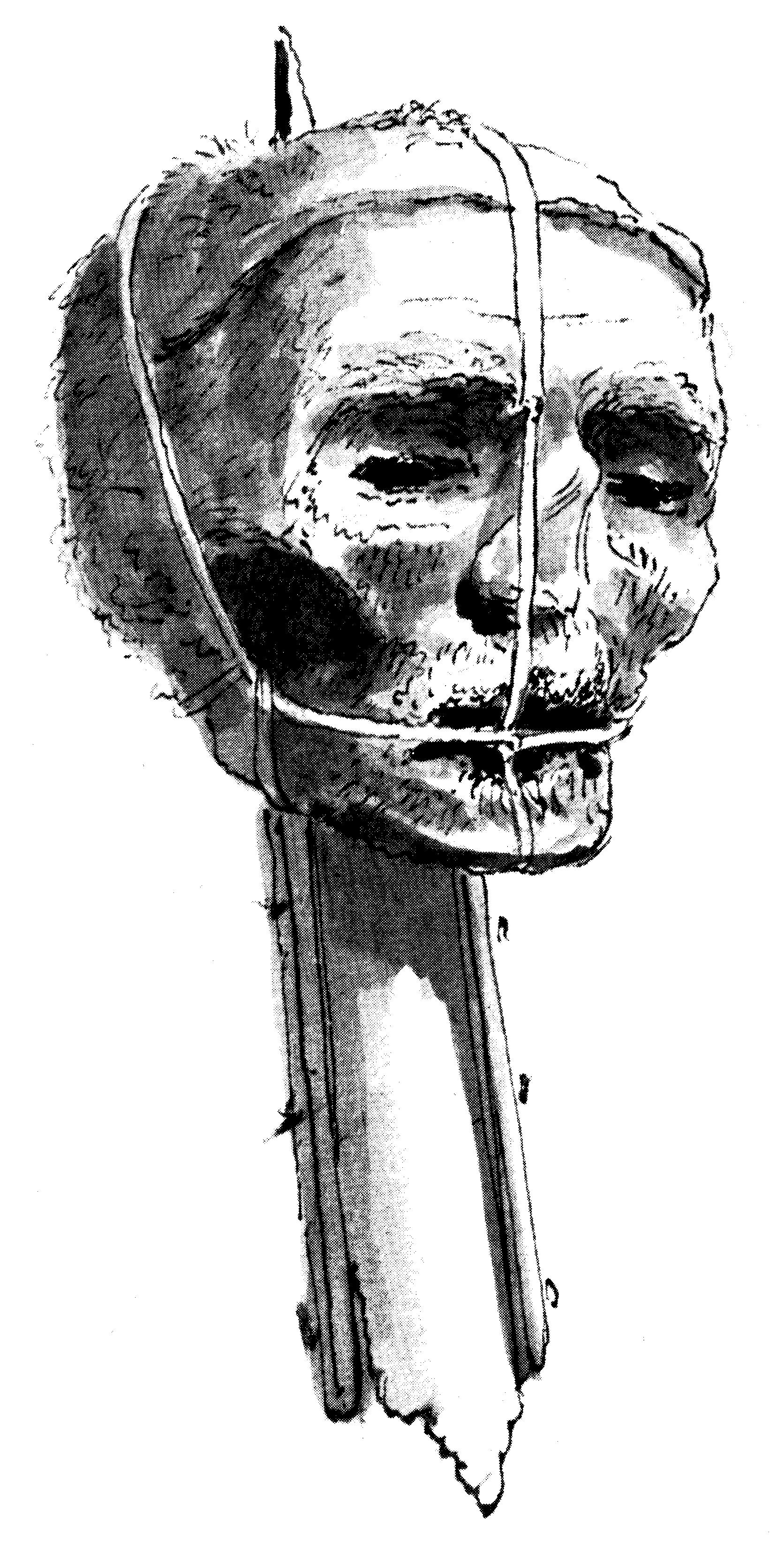
A drawing of Cromwell's head on a spike from the late 18th century

Oliver Cromwell, born on 25 April 1599, led the Parliamentarian army in the English Civil War. Upon his army's victory, he oversaw the conversion of England into a republic, abolishing the monarchy and the House of Lords after the execution of King Charles I in January 1649. Cromwell's rule as Lord Protector (beginning in December 1653) was not dissimilar to the Personal Rule of his royal predecessor. He maintained sole, unrestricted power, and lived in the many royal palaces. In 1657 he was formally offered the title of King, but after an "agony of mind and conscience" turned it down. Throughout 1658, Cromwell suffered illness and family tragedy, and he died on the afternoon of 3 September 1658 (Old Style).

Oliver Cromwell by Samuel Cooper

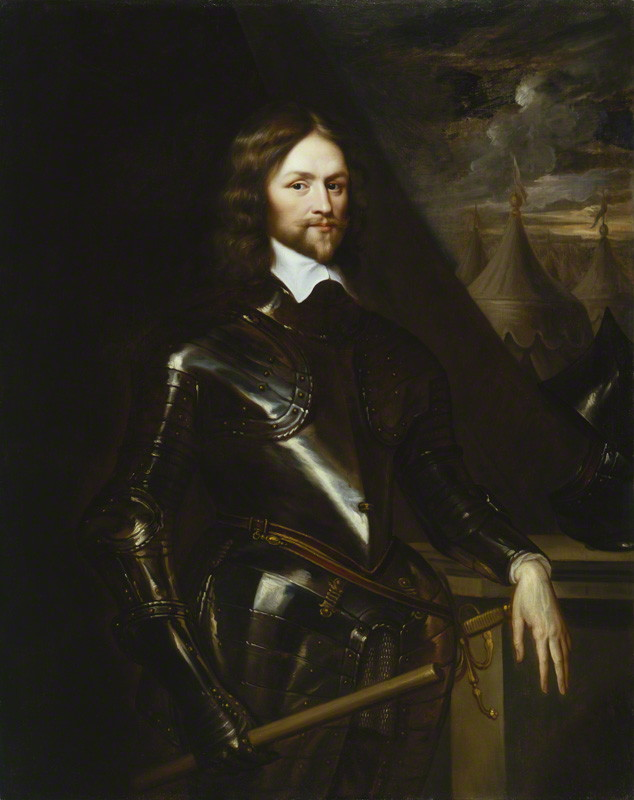
Henry Ireton. Cromwell passed the command of Parliamentarian forces in Ireland to Ireton in 1650. He died of disease at the siege of Limerick in 1651.

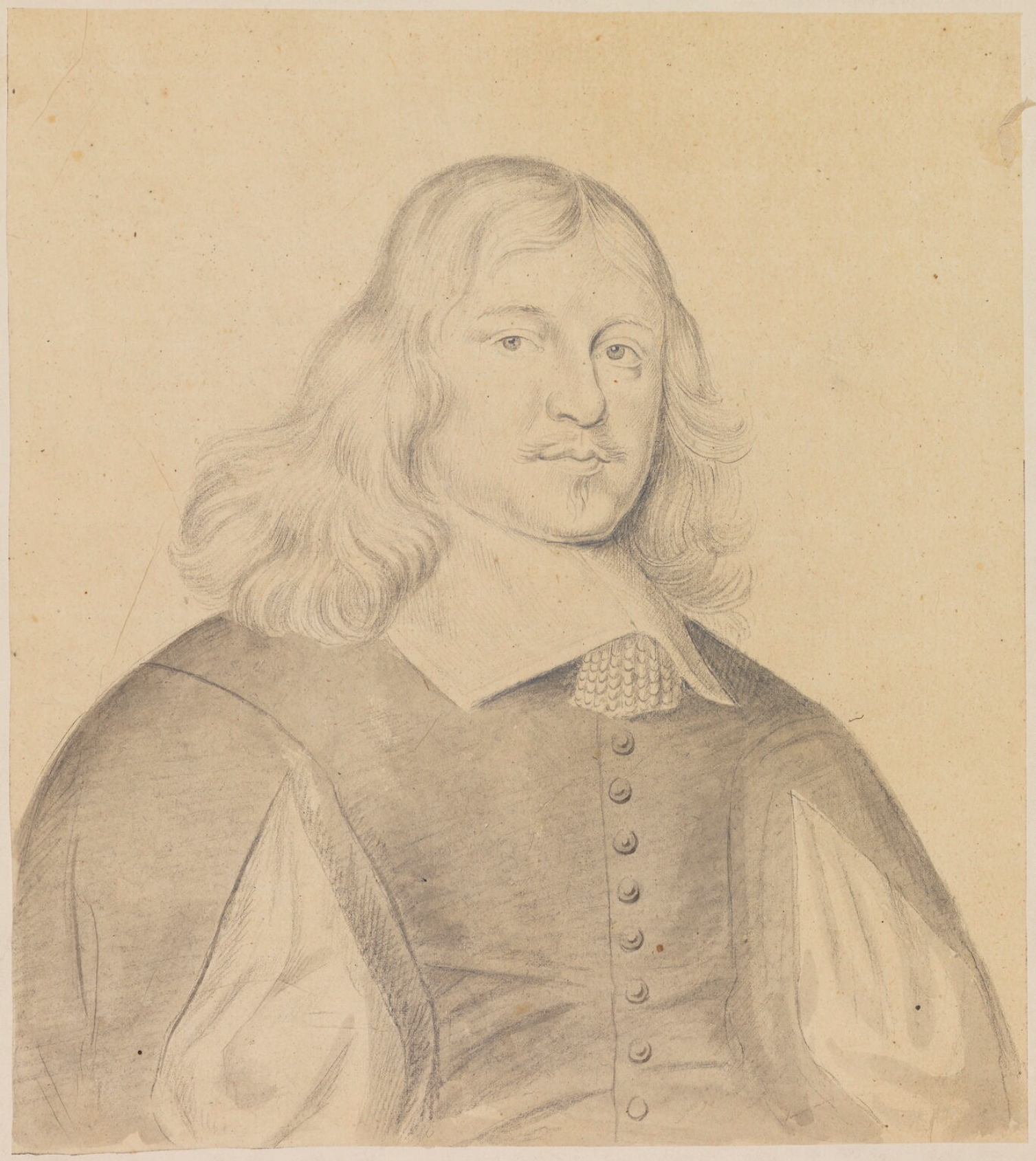
John Bradshaw

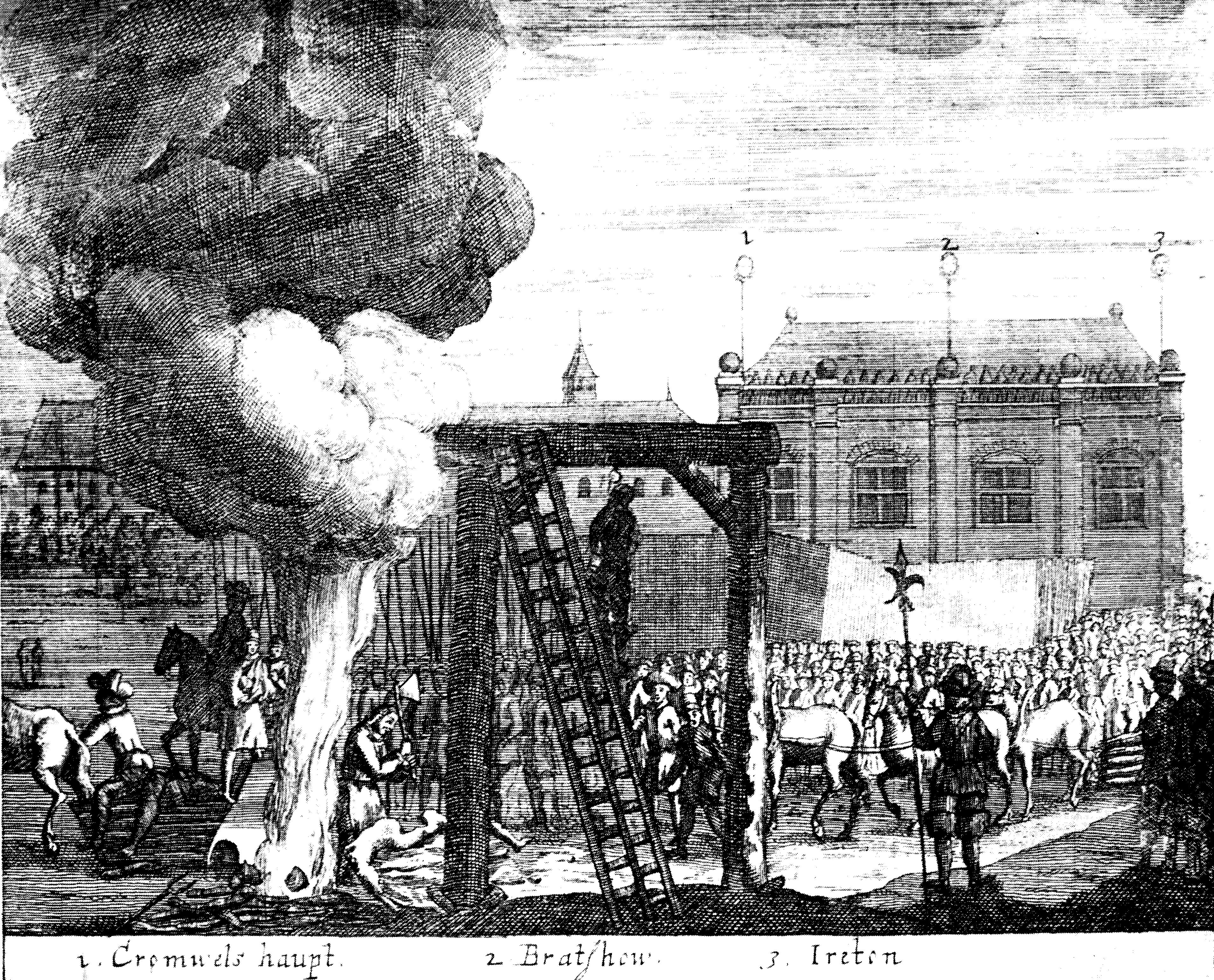
Contemporary scene outside Westminster Hall, showing Tyburn and the three heads mounted on poles on the right. Its caption lists the heads as 1 Cromwell; 2 Bradshaw and 3 Ireton

His death and funeral were treated with the same respect afforded to English monarchs before him. On 20 September, his body was moved to Somerset House to lie in state, which was opened to the public on 18 October. The body had been embalmed, shrouded and sealed in a lead coffin, which in turn was placed in a wooden decorated coffin, placed next to a life-like effigy. The effigy was decorated with the royal symbols, including: "a rich Suit of uncut Velvet ... laced with a rich gold lace, and furr'd with Ermins; upon the Kirtle is the Royal large Robe of the like Purple Velvet laced, and fur'd with Ermins, with rich strings, and tassels of gold ... upon his head, the Cap of Regality of Purple Velvet, furr'd with Ermins ... upon the Cushion of the Chair stands the Imperial Crown set with stones." The elaborate funeral procession, delayed twice by hesitant preparations, made its way through London on 23 November 1658. The body itself had already been buried at Westminster Abbey two weeks earlier due to its fast decay (by the time of the funeral procession, he had been dead over two months). A catafalque had been erected to receive his coffin which was similar to that of King James I, only "much more stately and expensive".

Cromwell's body lay undisturbed at Westminster until the restoration of the Stuart monarchy under Charles's son, King Charles II, in 1660. After their trial, conviction and sentencing, twelve surviving regicides (those who had participated in the trial and execution of Charles I) were hanged, drawn and quartered—that is, dragged through the streets on an unwheeled sledge or hurdle, hanged by the neck and cut down live, disembowelled while alive, beheaded and dismembered (cut into four quarters). (Note: At the end of the account "Excerpts from the trial of 10 regicides in October 1660" there is a description of the executions. They were all hanged, drawn and quartered, apart from Francis Hacker, who was hanged. Three other regicides were similarly tried and executed over the next two years (Axtell 2006).) In addition, the recalled parliament ordered the posthumous execution of the deceased regicides Oliver Cromwell, John Bradshaw and Henry Ireton. The laws of treason placed a traitor's remains at the king's disposal.

Cromwell's body, hidden in the wall of the middle aisle of Henry VII Lady Chapel, took effort to exhume because the wood and cloth were difficult to shift. On 28 January 1661, the bodies of Cromwell and Ireton were taken to the Red Lion Inn in Holborn, joined the following day by the body of John Bradshaw, before being taken to Tyburn for execution. On the morning of 30 January 1661, the anniversary of the execution of King Charles I, the shrouded bodies in open coffins were dragged on a sledge through the streets of London to the gallows, where each body was hanged in full public view until around four o'clock that afternoon. After being taken down, Cromwell's head was severed with eight blows, placed on a metal spike on a 20-foot (6.1 m) oak pole, and raised above Westminster Hall. Various conspiracy theories exist as to what happened to the body, including a rumour that Cromwell's daughter Mary had it rescued from the pit and interred at her husband's home at Newburgh Priory. A sealed stone vault was claimed to contain the remains of the headless Cromwell, but generations of the family have refused requests, including one from King Edward VII, to open it. Biographer John Morrill stated that it was more likely that Cromwell's body was thrown into the pit at Tyburn, where it remained.

== Journey ==
=== Westminster Hall to Du Puy ===
Cromwell's head remained on a spike above Westminster Hall until at least 1684, not counting a temporary removal for roof maintenance in 1681. Although no firm evidence has been established for the whereabouts of the head from 1684 to 1710, the circumstances in which Cromwell's head came into private ownership are rumoured to be tied with a great storm towards the end of James II's reign (1685–1688), which broke the pole bearing the head, throwing it to the ground. A sentinel guarding the Exchequer's Office came across it, after which he hid it under his cloak and stored it, hidden, in the chimney of his house. The loss of the head was still significant in London at the time, and many searched for it, hoping to claim the "considerable reward" being offered for its safe return. The guard, after seeing "the placards which ordered any one possessing it to take it to a certain office ... was afraid to divulge the secret". The first firm sighting of the head since its disappearance from Westminster Hall was recorded in 1710, when it was in the possession of Claudius Du Puy, a Swiss-French collector of curiosities, who displayed it in his private museum in London. According to Fitzgibbons, Du Puy's museum was internationally famous and ranked among the top attractions in London at the time, attracting visitors such as the traveller Zacharias Conrad von Uffenbach, who was not impressed by what he saw. After hearing Du Puy's boast that he could sell the head for as much as 60 guineas (£63, or the equivalent of about £5000 in today's British money), (Note: One English guinea was worth 21 shillings, or one pound and one shilling sterling (£1.05 in decimal), so 60 guineas equals £63.) Uffenbach exclaimed his surprise that "this monstrous head could still be so dear and worthy to the English".

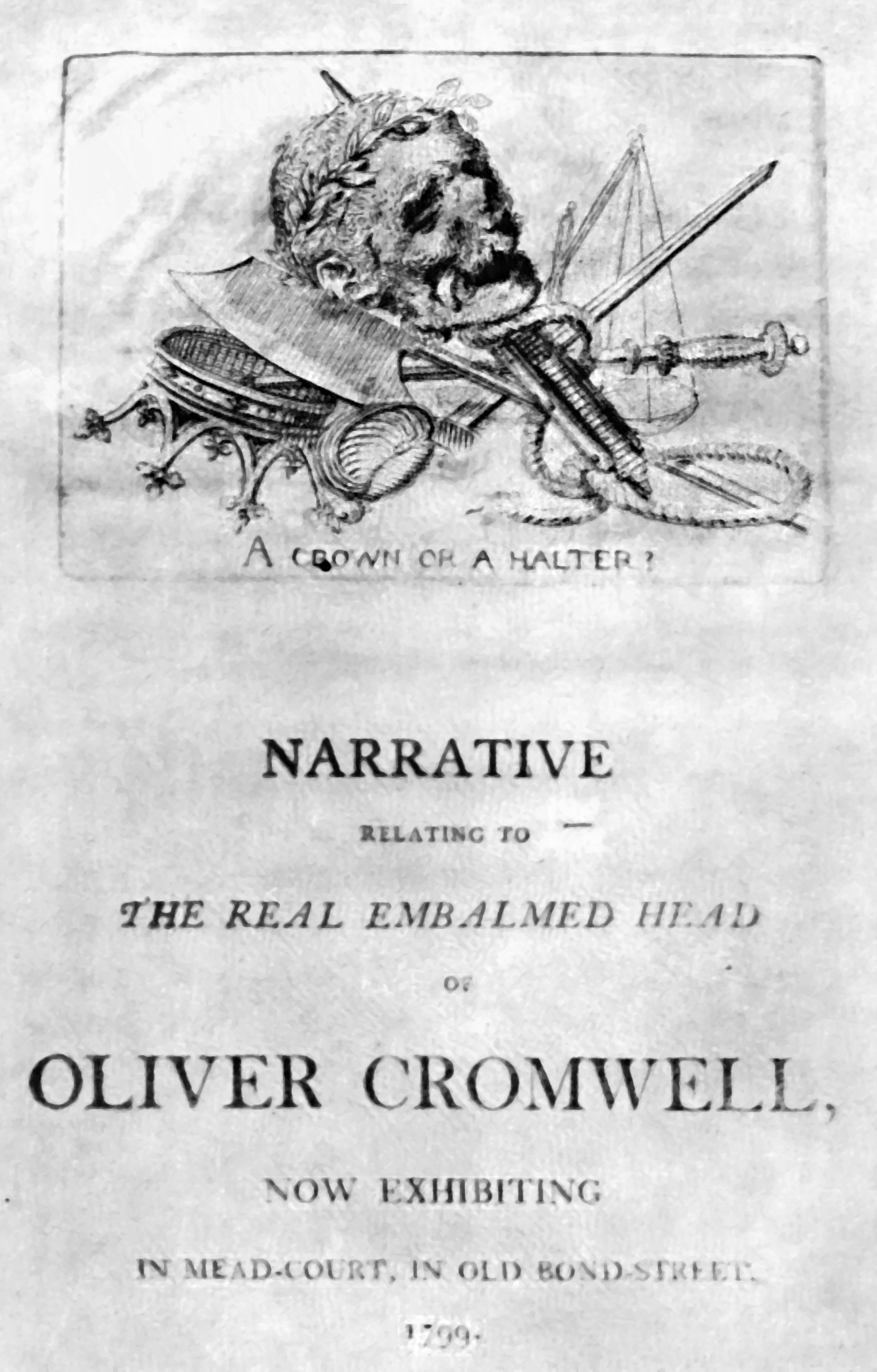
Advertisement for the Hughes brothers' exhibition of Cromwell's head, 1799. The exhibition was a failure.

=== Russell and Cox ===
By Du Puy's death in 1738, the head had shifted in importance and status. When it was atop Westminster Hall high above the London skyline, it gave a sinister and potent warning to spectators. By the 18th century, it had become a curiosity and an attraction, and it had lost its original sinister message. The head fell out of prominence until the late 18th century, when it was in the possession of a failed comic actor and drunkard named Samuel Russell, who was rumoured to be a relative of Cromwell. This is plausible: the Cromwells intermarried with the Russells. It is also possible that the head was sold to the Russell family after Du Puy's death as an easy target for a sale. Russell possibly had some connections with Sidney Sussex College, as he unsuccessfully attempted to sell the head to the Master of the College in or before 1775. Some time around 1780, it was spotted by the prominent goldsmith, clockmaker and toyman James Cox, who was "convinced by all the circumstances that it was the identical head of Oliver Cromwell". Cox offered £100 (the 2023 equivalent of £15,181), but "poor as he was, and considerably in debt, Russell refused to part with it, so dear to him was that which he knew to be the sacred relic of his great ancestor." Russell did not take the correct care with the head; in drunken gatherings, he passed the head around, leading to "irreparable erosion of its features". Cox connived to get the head using a different approach. He offered Russell small sums of money, gradually reaching the total of just over £100, and Russell could not pay when the loan was recalled. Thus his only option was to give up the head. In April 1787 it was legally transferred from Russell to Cox. As Fitzgibbons, Pearson, and Morant argued, Cox's pursuit of the head appears to be for retail investment. By the time of his acquisition, he was a rich jeweller and no longer owned his museum, so display was not his intention.

Cox sold the head in 1799 to a trio of speculators, the Hughes brothers, for £230 (about £30,000 in 2020). Interested in starting their own display in Bond Street, the brothers acquired the head as part of other Cromwell-related items. Thousands of posters were produced for the event, but the exhibit was marred by doubtful provenance. The Hughes brothers and their publicist, John Cranch, wrote to Cox to ask about the gaps in the journey, but Cox was evasive, leading to concerns that he had sold them a fake. Indeed, Cranch could not come up with a documentary history of how the head came into their hands, so he improvised a story that Cromwell's head was "the only instance of a head cut off and spiked that had before been embalmed; which is precisely the case with respect to the head in question". Although Henry Ireton had also been embalmed before being beheaded, the story stuck, but it was in vain. The exhibition was a failure. The entrance fee was high (two shillings and sixpence, about the equivalent of £5) and rumours that the head was a fake were prevalent.

=== 19th and 20th centuries ===
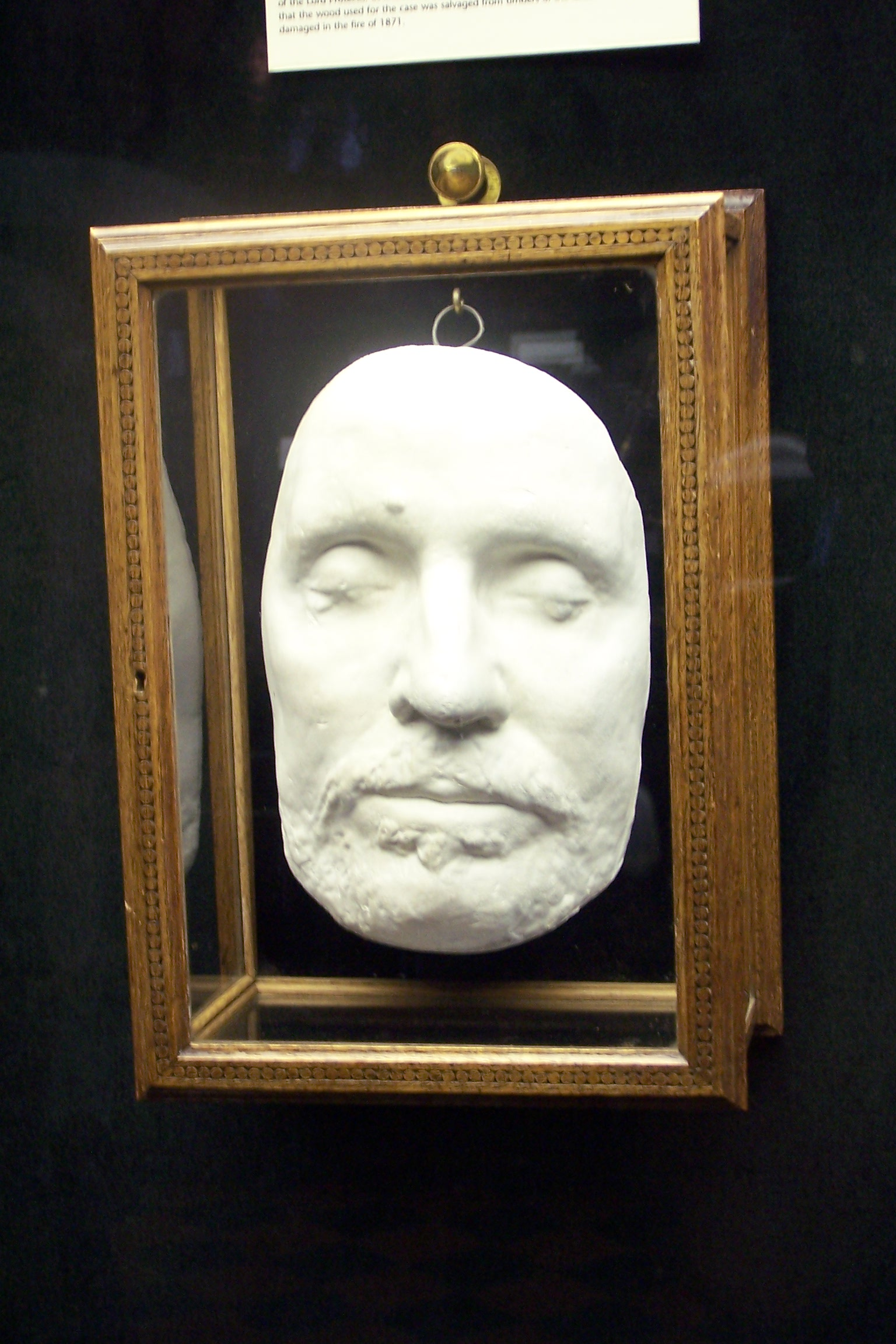
Cromwell's death mask at Warwick Castle

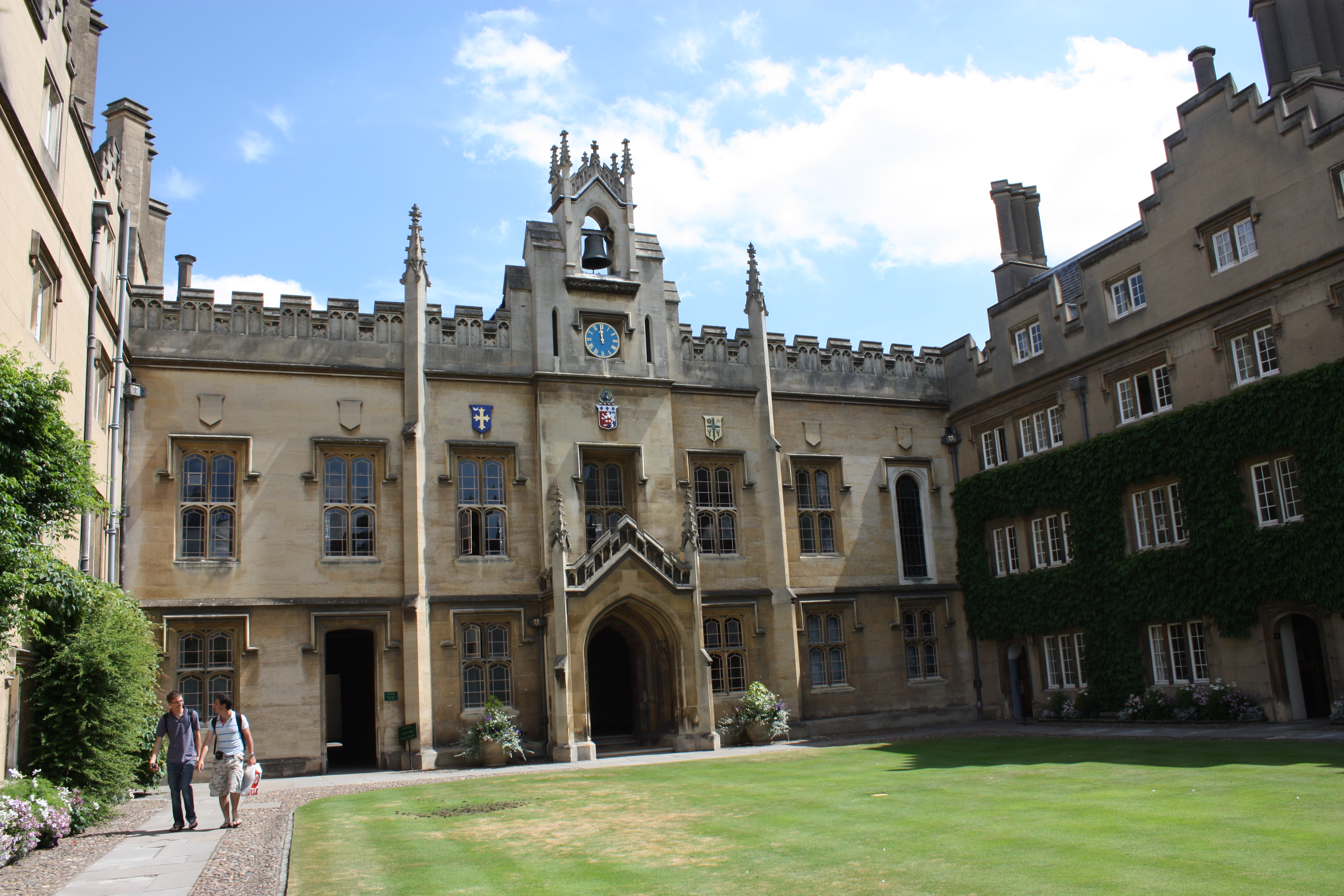
The chapel at Sidney Sussex College, Cambridge

Despite the failure of the Hughes brothers' exhibition, a Hughes daughter continued to show the head to anyone who wanted to see it. An offer was made to Sir Joseph Banks, but "he desired to be excused from seeing the remains of the old Villanous [sic] Republican, the mention of whose very name made his blood boil with indignation". William Bullock, considering a purchase, wrote to Lord Liverpool, who stated "the strong objection which would naturally arise to the exhibition of human remains at a Public Museum frequented by Persons of both Sexes and of all ages". Failure to sell to public museums forced the daughter to sell it privately, and in 1815 it was sold to Josiah Henry Wilkinson, in whose family it would remain until its burial. Maria Edgeworth, attending breakfast with Wilkinson in 1822, was shown the head, and she wrote with great surprise that she had seen "Oliver Cromwell's head—not his picture—not his bust—nothing of stone or marble or plaister [sic] of Paris, but his real head".

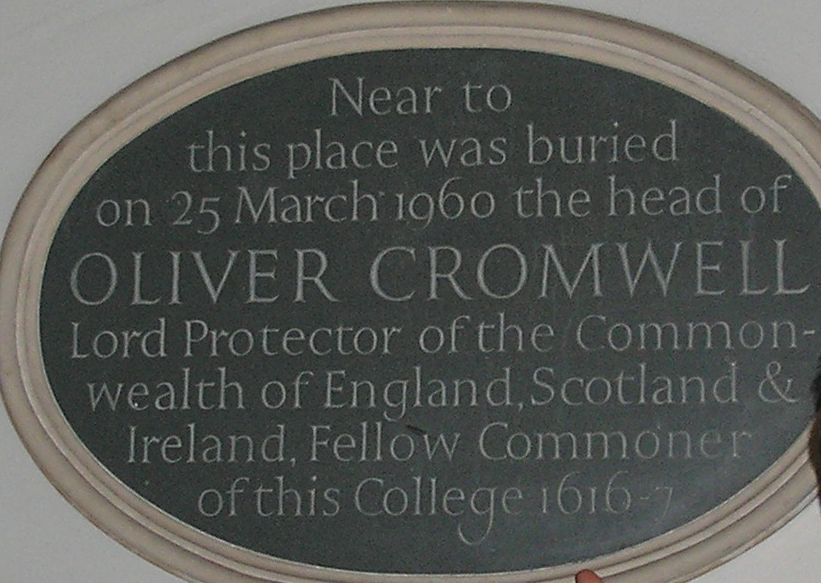
Plaque at Sidney Sussex College, Cambridge, commemorating the burial of Cromwell's head in 1960

Coinciding with the release of his Letters and Speeches of Oliver Cromwell in 1845, Thomas Carlyle was asked to view the head. He did not, and on the basis of a friend's visit, wrote a scathing dismissal of the authenticity of the head: "it has hair, flesh and beard, a written history bearing that it was procured for £100 (I think of bad debt) about 50 years ago ... the whole affair appears to be fraudulent moonshine, an element not pleasant even to glance into, especially in a case like Oliver's." Fitzgibbons, Pearson and Morant agree that Carlyle's dismissal was not based on any historical or scientific fact. Although Carlyle conceded that it was "the head of some decapitated man of distinction", the only other known man of distinction to be embalmed and then decapitated in such a manner over the previous 200 years was Henry Ireton. George Rolleston had conducted an examination on another skull—called the Ashmolean skull—after claims that it was Cromwell's head. Rolleston was unconvinced by the skull's supposed history, and visited Wilkinson's home to see the skull shortly afterwards. After an examination, he dismissed the Ashmolean skull as a fake and declared that the Wilkinson head was the real head of Cromwell.

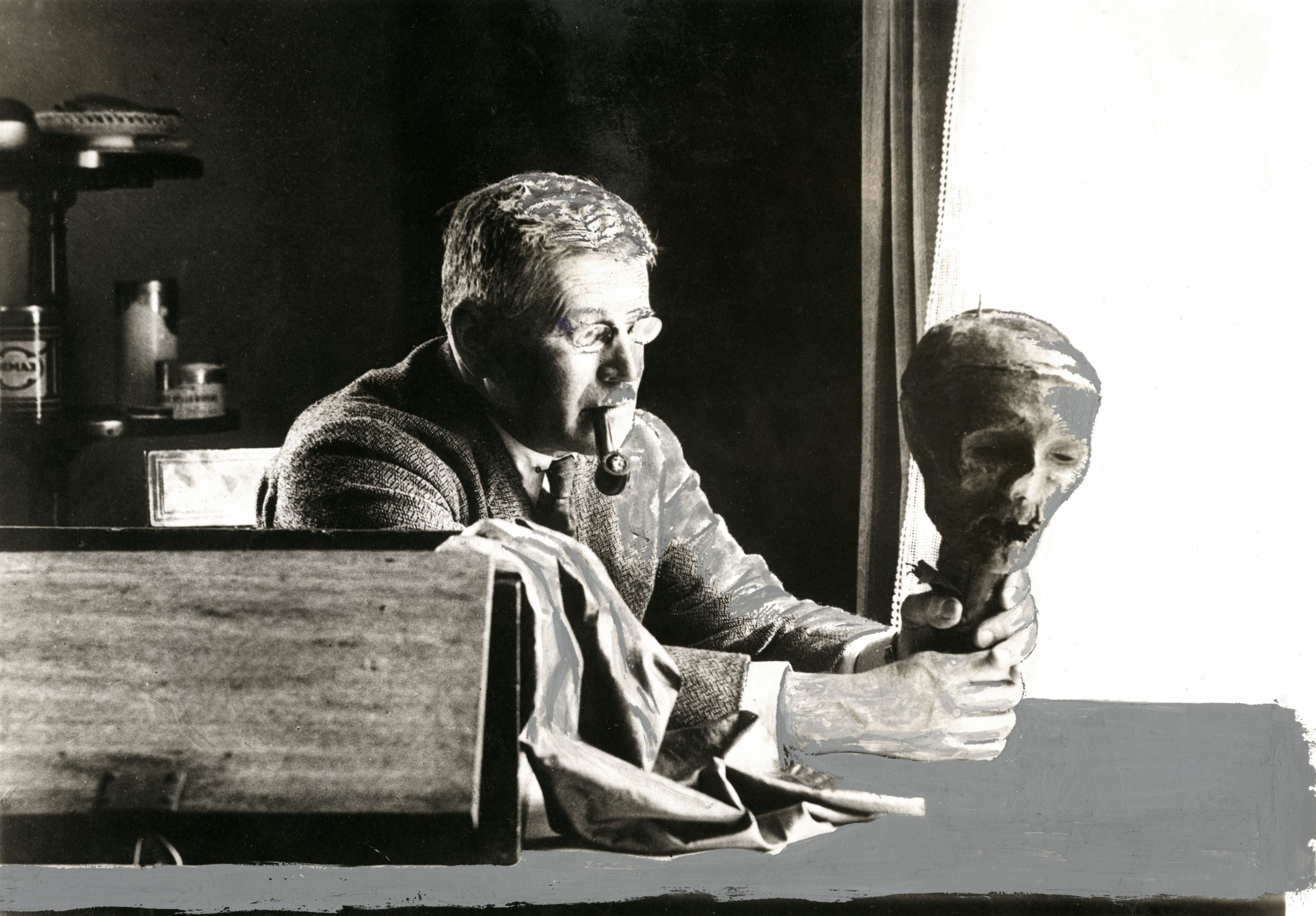
Horace Wilkinson with Cromwell's head

After another full examination in 1911, with comparisons with the Ashmolean head, archaeologists dismissed the Ashmolean head as a fake. The absence of firm evidence of the whereabouts of Cromwell's head between 1684 and 1787 made them wary about declaring the head genuine. They concluded their study unable to verify or refute the head's identity. The uncertainty increased public demand for a full scientific examination, and Wilkinson reluctantly allowed the head to be taken for examination by the statistician Karl Pearson and the anthropologist Geoffrey Morant. Their 109-page report concluded that there was a "moral certainty" that the Wilkinson head was that of Oliver Cromwell. Horace Wilkinson died in 1957, bequeathing the head to his son, also called Horace. The younger Horace Wilkinson wished to organise a proper burial for the head rather than a public display, so he contacted Sidney Sussex College, which Cromwell had attended in his youth and which welcomed the burial. There it was interred on 25 March 1960, in a secret location near the antechapel, preserved in the oak box in which the Wilkinson family had kept the head since 1815. The box was placed into an airtight container and buried with only a few witnesses, including family and representatives of the college. The secret burial was not announced until October 1962.

== Authenticity ==
=== Head ===
The authenticity of the head has long been debated, and has resulted in several scientific analyses. The most notable and detailed of these was Karl Pearson and Geoffrey Morant's study conducted in the 1930s, which concluded that the Wilkinson head was that of Cromwell. The position of the head, in relation to the heads of Bradshaw and Ireton, has also been called into question. Pearson and Morant upheld the originally understood position—traditionally, Bradshaw's head was in the middle, with Cromwell to the right and Ireton to the left—through careful analysis of contemporary poems and plans.

The Hughes brothers' failure to piece together a solid history of the head was possibly partly responsible for their inability to attract visitors. The skull held by the Ashmolean, reputed to be that of Cromwell, was the head's first rival claim, but the provenance in that instance did not prove to be reputable. The story attached to the Ashmolean skull was that:

In 1672, Oliver's skull was blown off the north side of Westminster Hall down into the leads of the same and taken thence by Mr. John Moore ... Sometime after this he gave it to Mr. Warner, apothecary, living in King Street, Westminster. Mr. Warner sold it for 20 broad pieces of gold to Humphrey Dove, Esq. ... This skull was taken out of Mr. Dove's chest at his death in 1687.

Cromwell's head was conclusively seen on Westminster Hall as late as 1684, and it was on the south side of the Hall. Archaeological evidence also disproved the Ashmolean skull's authenticity. It was pierced from the top, not from the bottom; and the skull had no trace of skin or hair, showing it had never been embalmed.

=== Body ===
Rumours and conspiracy theories have circulated since Cromwell's head fell from Westminster Hall. According to Fitzgibbons, the rumours surrounding Cromwell's body immediately after his death are "merely good yarns born out of over-active imaginations". One legend claims that he was conveyed secretly to Naseby, the site of his "greatest victory and glory", for a midnight burial. The field was then ploughed over to hide evidence of the burial. Another legend, written in the 1730s by a John Oldmixon, claims that "a reliable Gentlewoman who attended Cromwell in his last sickness" had said the coffin was sunk in the deepest part of the River Thames the night following Cromwell's death. Fearful of royalists, "it was consulted how to dispose of his Corpse. They could not pretend to keep it for the Pomp of a publick burial ... and to prevent its falling into barbarous hands, it was resolved to wrap it up in lead, to put it aboard a Barge, and sink it in the deepest part of the Thames, which was done the night following Cromwell's death."

In 1664 Samuel Pepys wrote of a story he had heard in which "Cromwell did, in his life, transpose many of the bodies of the Kings of England from one grave to another, and by that means it is not known certainly whether the head that is now set upon a post be that of Cromwell, or one of the Kings". If this story had any accuracy, Fitzgibbons suggests the irony would be that the posthumous act was possibly carried out on an English monarch rather than Cromwell himself. Another story even suggested that Cromwell's body was substituted for Charles I, adding what Fitzgibbons describes as "an even greater mockery of the events of 30 January 1649". This story is known to be false; Charles's tomb was opened in 1813, and his remains, including the cut that severed his head, remained as they were in 1649.

Fitzgibbons argues that it was not impossible for Cromwell's body to have been substituted before his posthumous execution. One proposition is that Sergeant Norfolke, who exhumed the bodies from the abbey, found the tombs of Cromwell and Ireton empty, prompting the government to sanction an exhumation of two other graves. This has been put forward because Bradshaw's body arrived at the Red Lion Inn at Holborn a day after Cromwell and Ireton, prompting rumour that he was the only real body to be hanged at Tyburn. Prestwich says that "His remains were privately interred in a small paddock near Holborn", but an alternative theory is that other corpses were substituted so that when the sledges dragged the bodies to the gallows, Cromwell's body was already buried. The faces on the three bodies, although heavily shrouded, were clearly visible; and since no witnesses expressed any doubt that the bodies were those of Cromwell and Ireton, there is no evidence supporting this theory.

== Bibliography ==
- Axtell, Daniel Gibbs (2006). "Selections from the Trial and Execution of Col. Daniel Axtell in October 1660". from An Exact and most Impartial Accompt Of the Indictment, Arraignment, Tryal, and Judgment (according to Law) of Twenty Nine Regicides, The Murtherers of His Late Sacred Majesty Of Most Glorious Memory... (As reprinted in London, 1679 ed.). London: Andrew Crook & Edward Powel. 1660.
- Banks, John (1760). A short critical review of the political life of Oliver Cromwell. C. Hitch and L. Hawes; J. Rivington; L. Davis and C. Reymers; S. Crowder; and T. Longman.
- Parish, C. (1996). "The Posthumous History of Oliver Cromwell's Head". In Beales, Derek Edward Dawson; Nisbet, Hugh Barr (eds.). Sidney Sussex College Cambridge: Historical Essays in Commemoration of the Quatercentenary. Boydell Press. pp. 105–110. ISBN 0-85115-629-0.
- Blackstone, Sir William (1962). Malcolm Kerr, Robert (ed.). Commentaries on the Laws of England (Oxford: Clarendon Press). Of Public Wrongs. Vol. IV (paperback ed.). Boston, Massachusetts: Beacon Press. p. 88 (92 in original).
- Cromwell Association (5 March 2011). "What happened to Cromwell's body after his death? Where are his mortal remains now?". Cromwell Association and the Cromwell Museum Huntingdon.
- Fitzgibbons, Jonathan (2008). Cromwell's Head. Kew: The National Archives. ISBN 978-1-905615-38-4.
- Howorth, Henry (1911). "Head of Oliver Cromwell" (PDF). The Archaeological Journal. London: 237–253.
- Noble, Mark (1787). Memoirs of the Protectoral House of Cromwell. London.
- Morrill, John (2009) [2004]. "Oliver Cromwell". Oxford Dictionary of National Biography (online ed.). Oxford University Press. doi:10.1093/ref:odnb/6765. (Subscription, Wikipedia Library access or UK public library membership required.)
- Pearson, Karl; Morant, Geoffrey (December 1934). "The Wilkinson Head of Oliver Cromwell and Its Relationship to Busts, Masks and Painted Portraits". Biometrika. 29 (3): 1–116. doi:10.1093/biomet/26.3.1.
- Prestwich, John (1787). Prestwich's Respublica. J. Nichols.
- Smyth, David (11 August 1996). "Is That Really Oliver Cromwell's Head? Well . . ". Los Angeles Times. Archived from the original on 11 August 2020.
