= Old Red Lion =

(The) Old Red Lion may refer to:

- Old Red Lion, Holborn, a pub in Holborn, central London
- Old Red Lion, Islington, a pub and theatre in Angel, Islington, London
- Old Red Lion, Kennington, a pub in Kennington, London

== See also ==
- Red Lion (disambiguation)
- The Lion (disambiguation)
