= Preston, Hertfordshire =

Village in Hertfordshire, England

Coordinates: 51.908786°N 0.285597°W

Preston
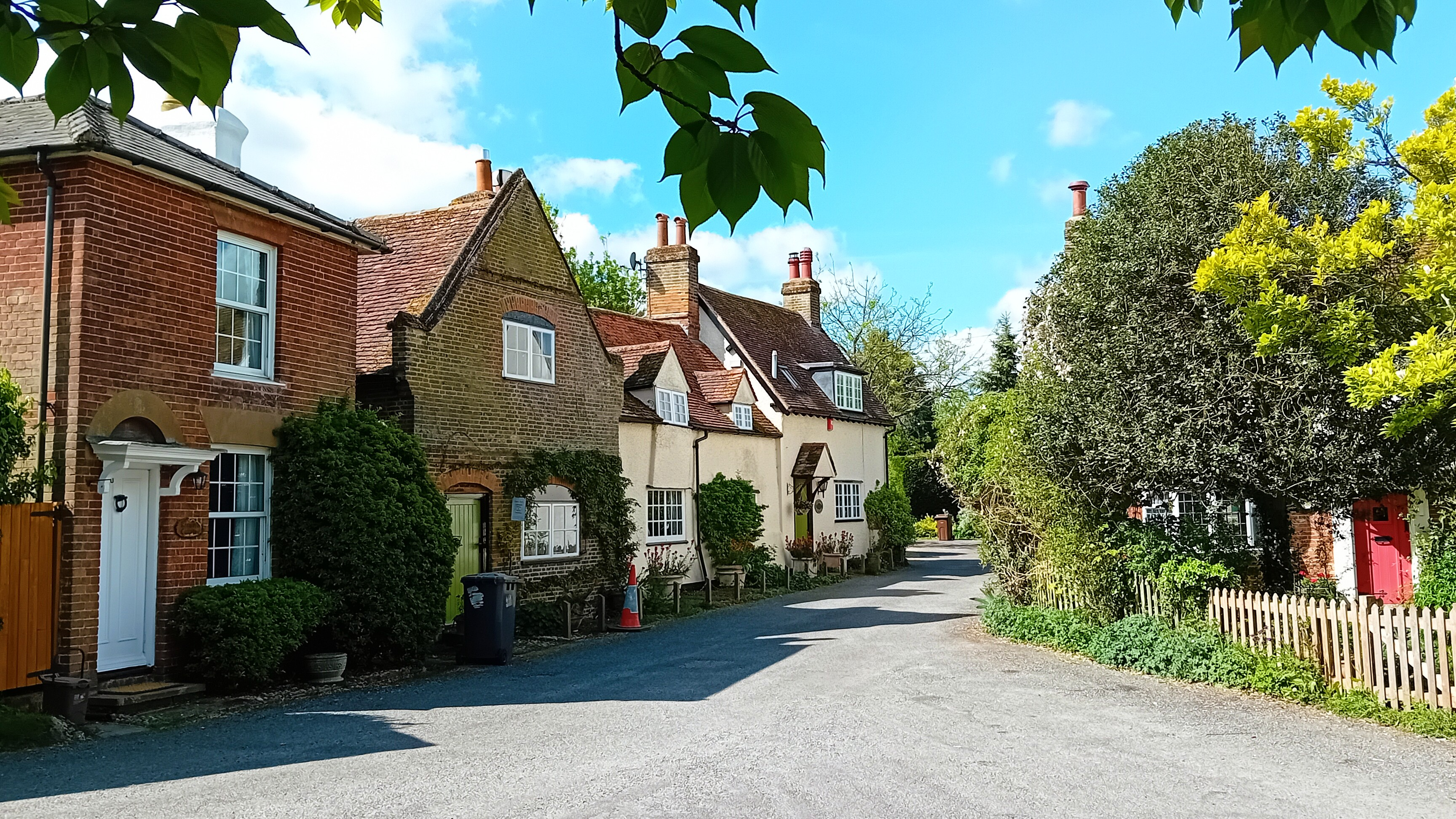
- Cottages at The Green

- Location within Hertfordshire
- Population: 425 (Parish, 2021)
- OS grid reference: TL181247
- Civil parish: Preston
- District: North Hertfordshire
- Shire county: Hertfordshire
- Region: East
- Country: England
- Sovereign state: United Kingdom
- Post town: Hitchin
- Postcode district: SG4
- Dialling code: 01462
- Police: Hertfordshire
- Fire: Hertfordshire
- Ambulance: East of England
- UK Parliament: Hitchin

Preston is a village and civil parish about 3 miles (4.8 km) south of Hitchin in Hertfordshire, England. At the 2021 census the parish had a population of 425.

== History ==
The village grew up around the Templar holdings at Temple Dinsley. The first church was mentioned in 1252, when six acres (24,000 m^{2}) of land was given to nuns from Elstow, Bedfordshire. Temple Dinsley passed on to the Knights Hospitaller after the dissolution of the Templars. When the Hospitallers were in turn dissolved in 1542, the manor went to Sir Ralph Sadleir. The current house at Temple Dinsley dates from 1714, and served as Princess Helena College between 1935 and 2021.

In the 17th century the village became linked with John Bunyan, who used to hold services in a natural amphitheatre now called Bunyan's Dell.

Prior to 1894, Preston and neighbouring Langley were part of the parish of Hitchin, together forming a long salient to the south of the town itself. Preston and Langley became separate civil parishes as a result of the Local Government Act 1894, with effect from the first parish meeting on 4 December 1894. Preston civil parish was then included in the Hitchin Rural District between 1894 and 1974, when it became part of North Hertfordshire. The parish of Preston was enlarged in 1955 with the addition of territory from the neighbouring parishes of St Ippolyts and King's Walden.

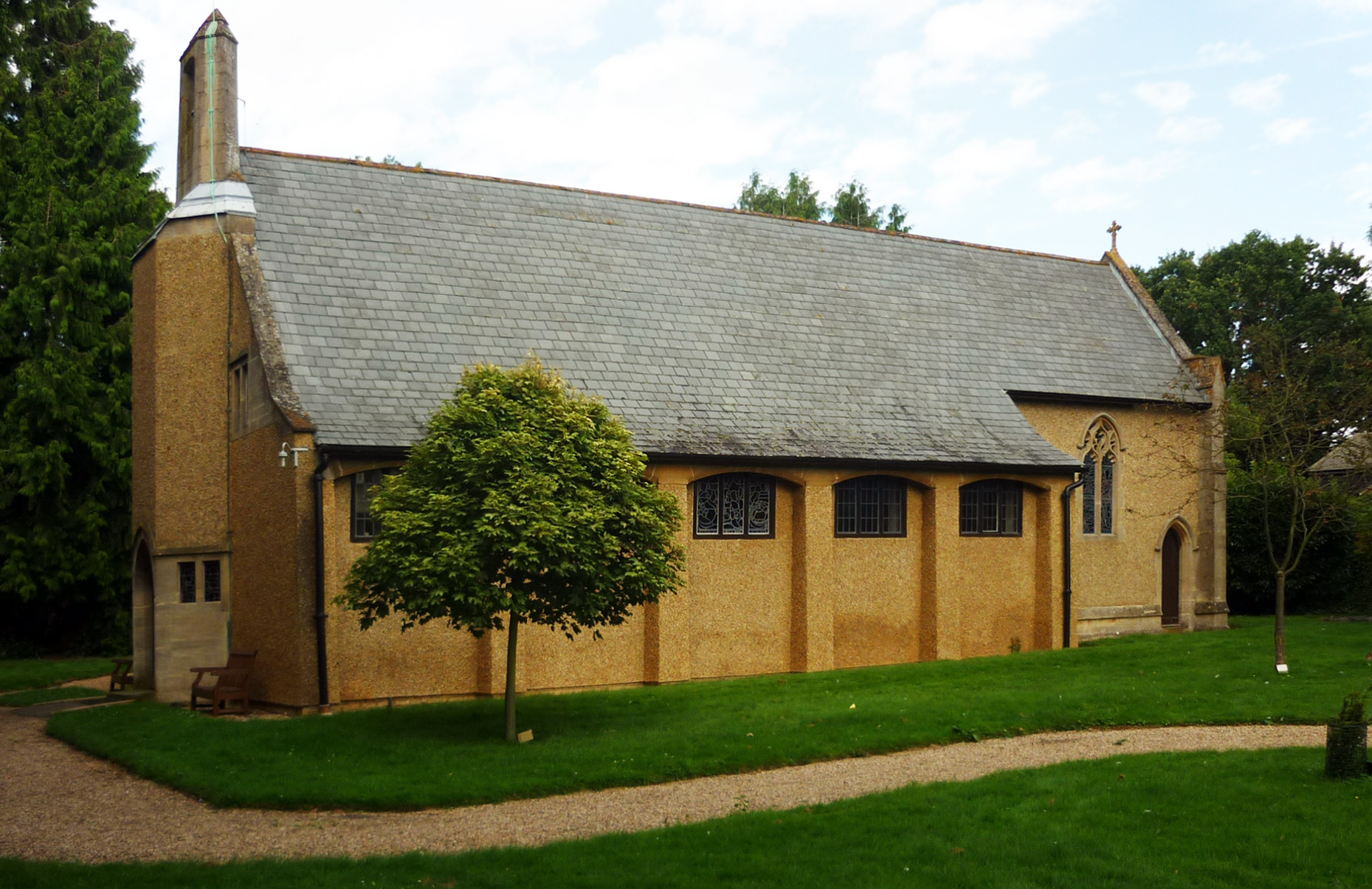
St Martin's Church

St Martin's, the local Anglican church, opened in 1900.

The ruined Minsden Chapel, reputed to be haunted, is located near the village, though is actually in Langley civil parish.

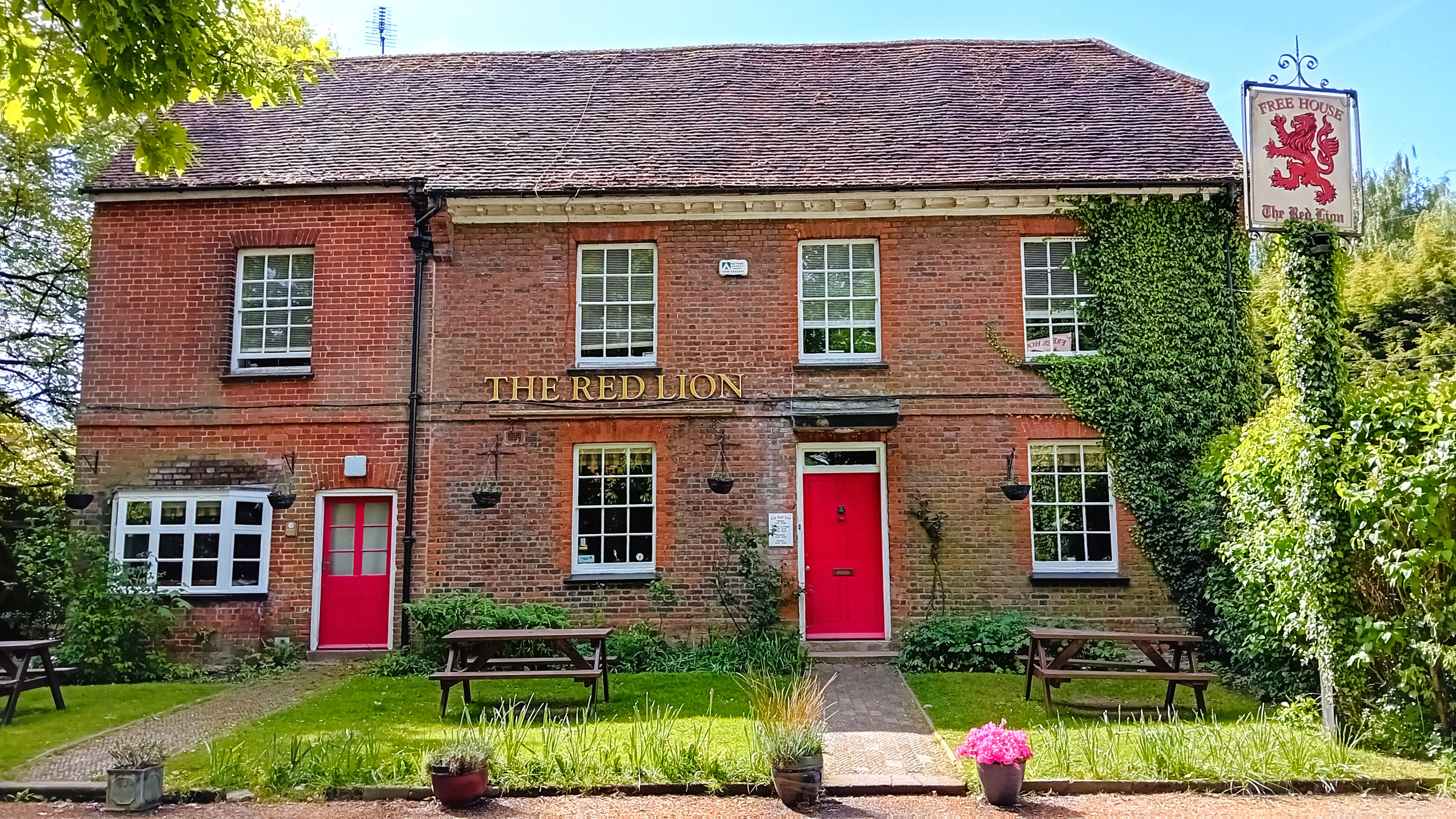
The Red Lion pub

The village pub, The Red Lion, was purchased by the community in 1983.

== Governance ==
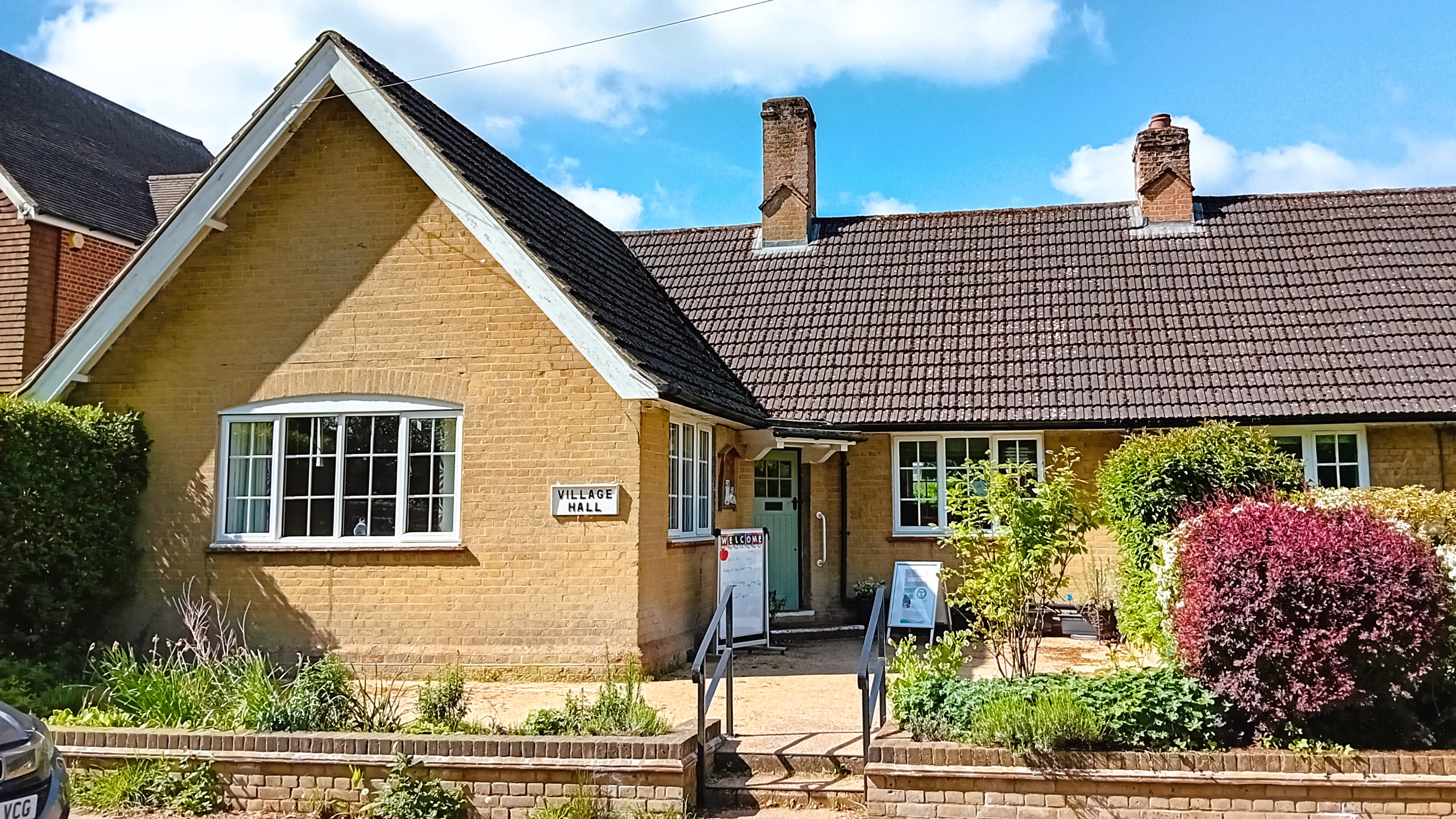
Village Hall, School Lane

There are three tiers of local government covering Preston, at parish, district and county level: Preston Parish Council, North Hertfordshire District Council, and Hertfordshire County Council. The parish council meets at the Village Hall on School Lane.

For national elections, the parish forms part of the Hitchin constituency.
