= William Foster (British architect) =

British architect

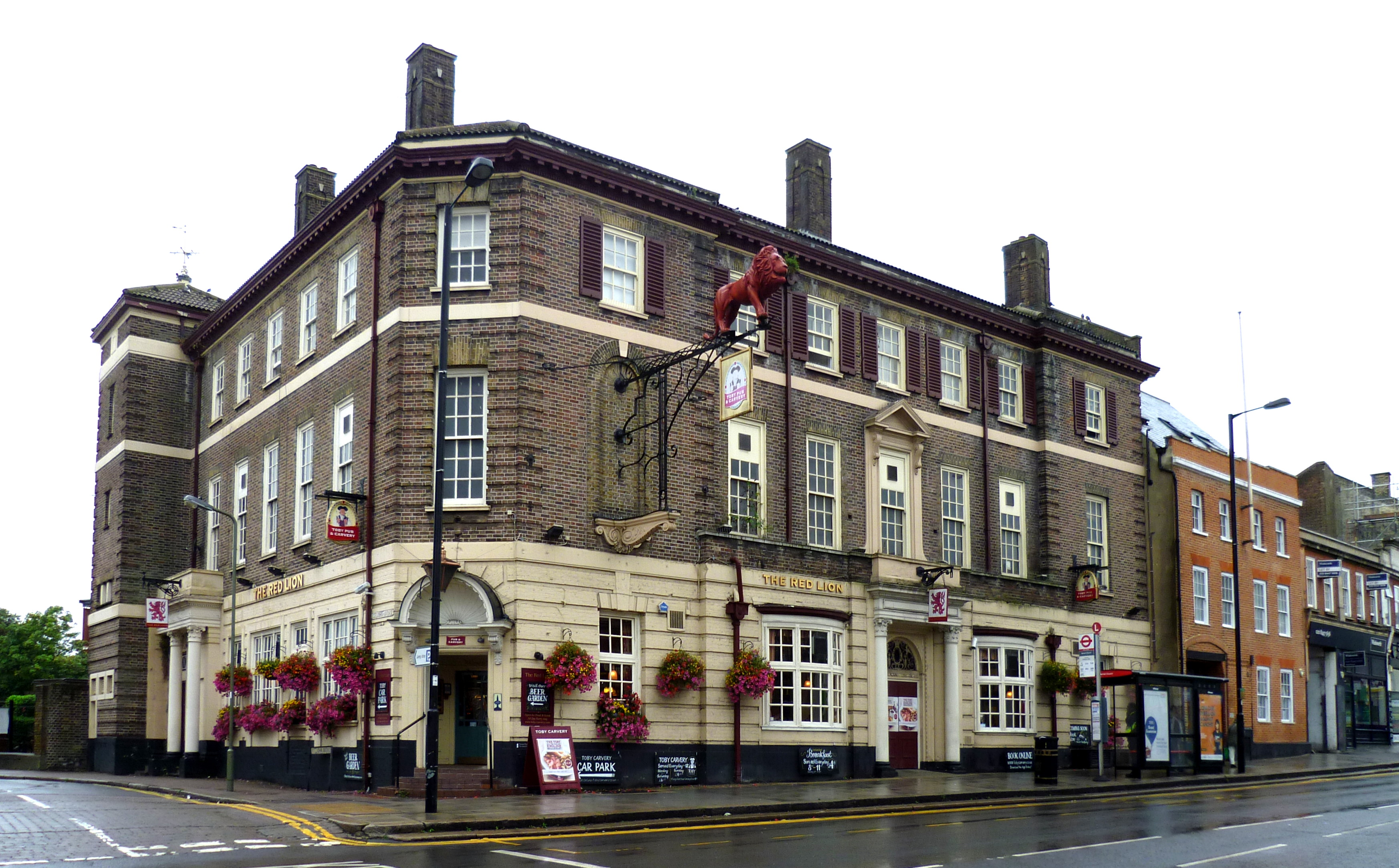
The Red Lion

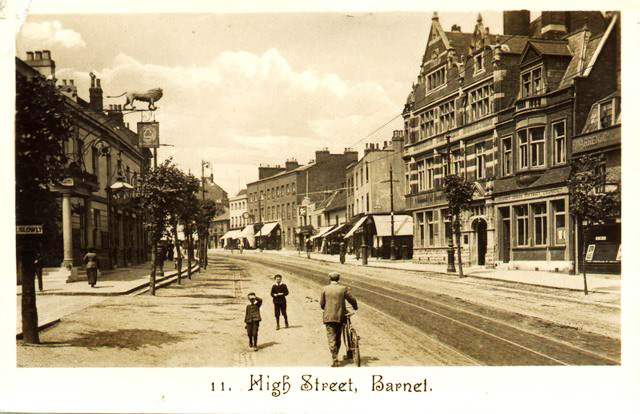
The Red Lion (left) as it once looked

William Foster (1876–1940), was a British architect, the designer of many pubs for the Meux Brewery, including The Red Lion, Chipping Barnet.
