= Princess Helena College =

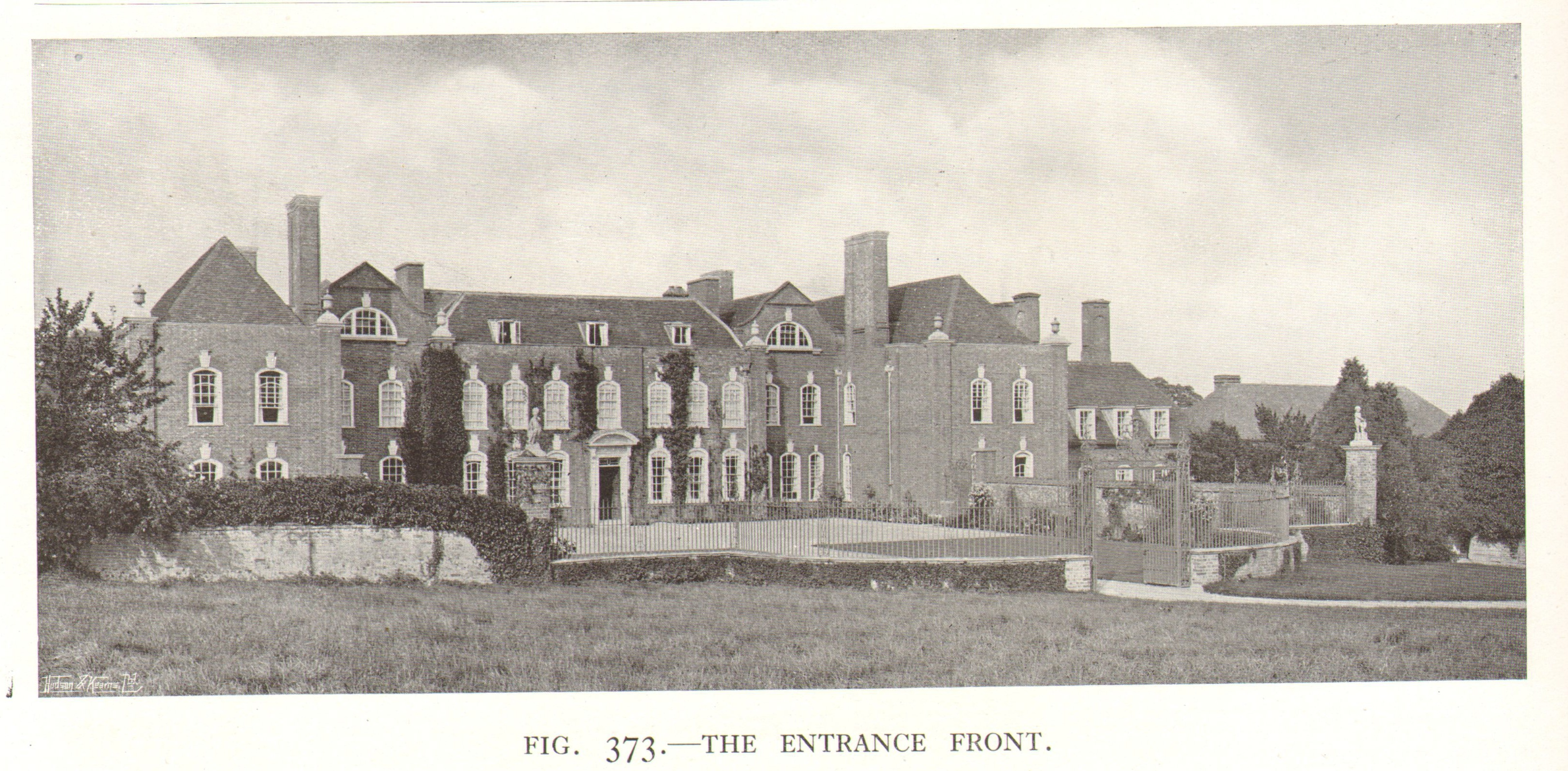

Location
- School Lane; Preston; Hitchin, Hertfordshire, SG4 7RT; England
- Coordinates: 51°54′34″N 0°16′58″W

Information
- Religious affiliation: Church of England
- Established: 1820; 206 years ago
- Closed: 2021
- Department for Education URN: 117614 Tables
- Gender: Co-ed (from Sept 2019 Boys in Years 7 and 12)
- Age: 11 to 18
- Houses: Gloucester, Windsor and York
- Colours: purple, green

PHC was a co-educational private day and boarding school for pupils aged 11 to 18 in Preston near Hitchin in Hertfordshire, England.

The school was housed in a Queen Anne country house, formerly known as Temple Dinsley, which was redesigned by Edwin Lutyens, at the same time as the gardens were designed by his great friend, Gertrude Jekyll. The house is listed Grade II* on the National Heritage List for England, and the gardens and landscaped park are listed Grade II* on the Register of Historic Parks and Gardens.

== History ==

Princess Helena College was founded by Miss Sophia Williams in 1820 for daughters of officers who had served in the Napoleonic Wars and daughters of Anglican clergy. It was originally established in Mornington Crescent, London, before moving to Regent's Park and then Ealing. The school moved to Temple Dinsley in 1935. Originally opened in honour of Princess Charlotte, in 1874, Princess Helena, Queen Victoria's third daughter, became President of the college, and the school enjoyed royal patronage ever since.

The school became part of United Learning in 2018, and from 2019, the college accepted boys at age 11 and age 16. The school closed at the end of August 2021 due to persistent financial difficulties that were exacerbated by the COVID-19 pandemic.

=== House system ===
Each new pupil was allocated to one of three houses: Gloucester, Windsor or York. The house system offered a platform for pupils of varying ages to work together, whether it be choreographing a house dance or researching for public speaking. House points were awarded for each event and students also earned points for excellent pieces of work.

=== Boarding ===
There was one boarding house, which was in the main school. Year 11 and sixth form students had single rooms while all other year groups shared rooms with a number of peers depending on their age. There were common rooms, kitchens and other spaces for relaxation and games. Boarders had access to music practice rooms and sports facilities in evenings, together with a varied range of weekend activities.
