= Consumers Cigar Box Company =

- U.S. National Register of Historic Places
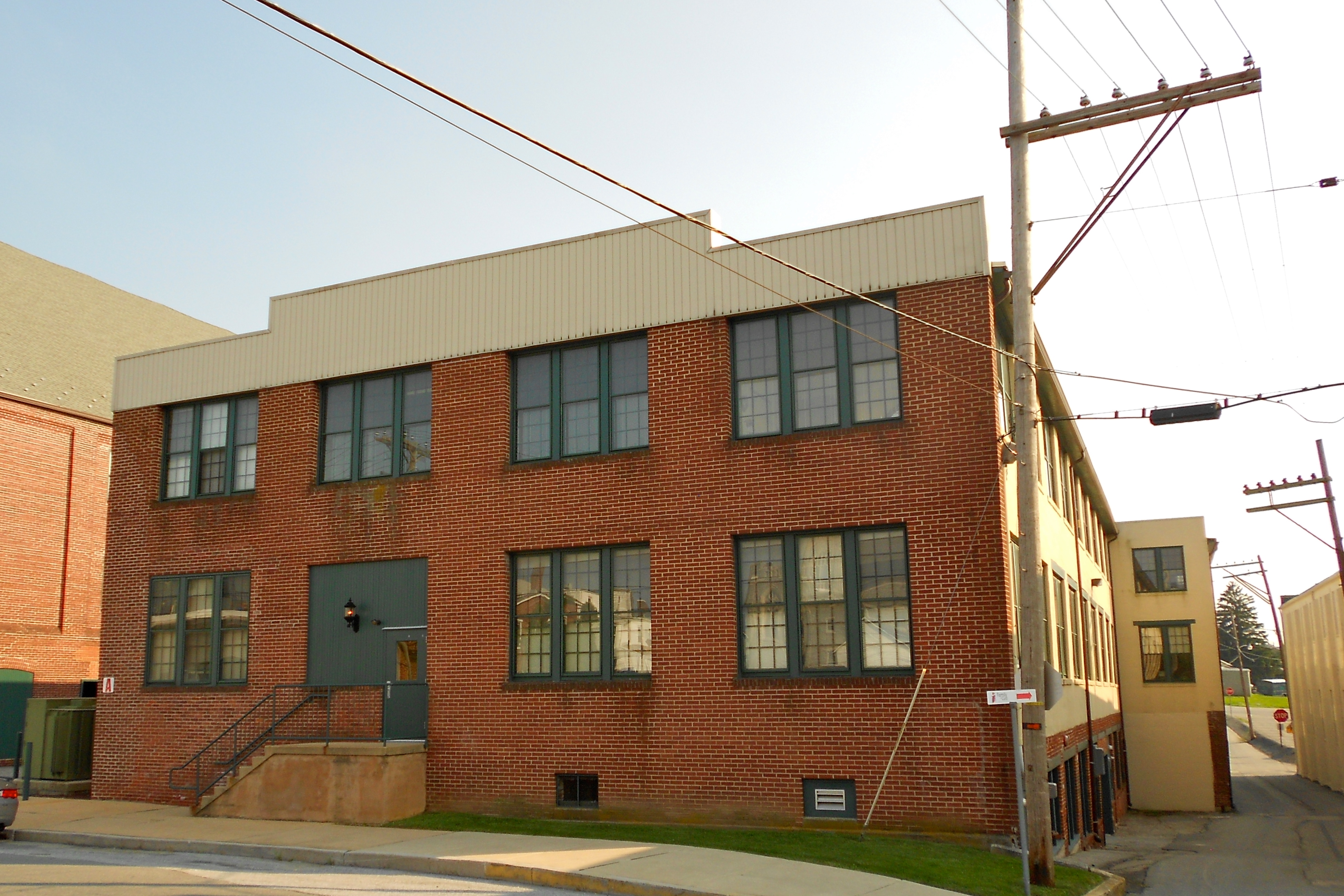
- Consumers Cigar Box Company, July 2013

- Location within Pennsylvania Location within the United States
- Location: 121 First Ave., Red Lion, Pennsylvania
- Coordinates: 39°53′48″N 76°36′21″W
- Area: less than one acre
- Built: 1921, 1925, 1935-1936, 1946
- NRHP reference No.: 99001196
- Added to NRHP: September 24, 1999

Consumers Cigar Box Company, also known as Red Lion Woodcraft Inc., is a historic factory located at Red Lion, York County, Pennsylvania. It was built in 1921, with additions in 1925 and 1935-1936. It is a large two-story, L-shaped building. It is built of concrete block and brick with a gable roof and stepped parapet. Cigar boxes were manufactured until the 1950s. The building housed various manufacturing operations until 1979.

It was added to the National Register of Historic Places in 1999. It is located in the Red Lion Borough Historic District.
