= Red Lion Inn (Stockbridge, Massachusetts) =

Historic hotel located in Stockbridge, Massachusetts

Coordinates: 42°16′55″N 73°18′43″W

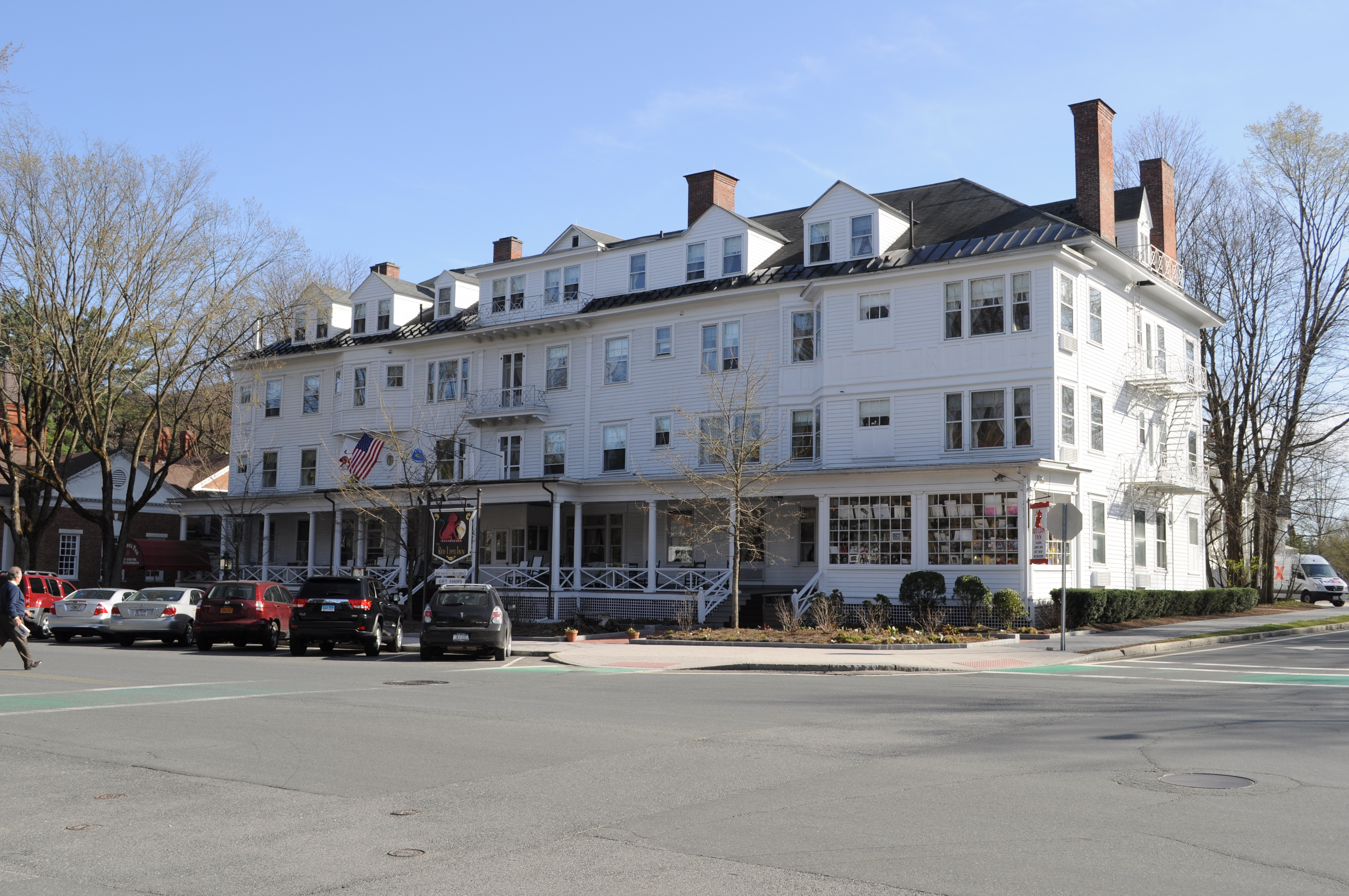
Red Lion Inn

The Red Lion Inn in Stockbridge, Massachusetts is one of the Historic Hotels of America of the National Trust for Historic Preservation.

The main building of the inn offers 82 guest rooms. In addition to the inn itself, the hotel operates nearby guest houses and other properties as alternative lodging options.

== History ==
After operating for over 100 years, the inn was destroyed by fire in 1896. Rebuilt the following year, the inn was owned by the same family until 1968, when under threat of being razed, it was purchased by the current owners.

Famous guests of the inn include presidents Grover Cleveland, William McKinley, Theodore Roosevelt, Calvin Coolidge, and Franklin Delano Roosevelt as well as noted authors Nathaniel Hawthorne, Henry Wadsworth Longfellow, and Thornton Wilder. In August 1947, Judy Garland opted to check in to the inn, along with her maid and psychiatrist, rather than be admitted to the Austen Riggs Center down the street as had been planned; Garland ended up staying at the inn for 16 nights, after which she decided to return home to California.

The inn was included in Norman Rockwell's 1967 painting, Stockbridge Main Street at Christmas (Home for Christmas).
