= Red Lion, Duke of York Street =

Listed pub in St James's, London, England

Red Lion
- The pub in 2026

General information
- Type: Public house
- Location: 2 Duke of York Street, St James's, London, England
- Coordinates: 51.508230°N 0.136481°W
- Year built: 1821; 205 years ago
- Renovated: 1871 (remodelled)
- Owner: Fuller's

Design and construction
- Designations

Listed Building – Grade II
- Official name: The Red Lion public house
- Designated: 14 January 1970
- Reference no.: 1066873

Renovating team
- Architect: W. H. Rawlings

Website
- redlionmayfair.co.uk

The Red Lion is a Grade II listed public house on Duke of York Street in St James's, London, England. The present building dates from 1821, although a pub has occupied the site since at least 1788. Remodelled in 1871 to designs by W. H. Rawlings, it retains a richly decorated late Victorian interior and is included on the Campaign for Real Ale (CAMRA)'s National Inventory of Historic Pub Interiors, where it holds a three-star rating for pubs of "outstanding national historic importance".

== History ==
The Red Lion was built in 1821, although a public house is believed to have occupied the site since at least 1788. The present building was erected after the landlord, Henry Watts, obtained a lease on two adjoining properties and redeveloped the site. In 1871, the building was remodelled to designs by the architect W. H. Rawlings, who introduced a new frontage with three separate entrances reflecting the division of the interior into distinct drinking areas served from a central bar. Decorative diamond-cut mirrors by Walter Gibbs & Sons of Blackfriars were also installed. The property was acquired by Meux's Brewery in 1907.

On 14 January 1970, the Red Lion was designated a Grade II listed building. It was included on the Campaign for Real Ale (CAMRA)'s National Inventory of Historic Pub Interiors before the inventory's grading system was revised. Under the revised scheme, it is rated three stars and its interior is regarded as being "of outstanding national historic importance". As of July 2026, the freehold was owned by Fuller's.

== Architecture ==
=== Exterior ===
The building is constructed of yellow brick with a traditional timber pub frontage and a slate roof. It has three main storeys with additional accommodation in the roof space. The pub was originally divided into three separate drinking areas served from a central bar area, each with its own entrance, although these divisions have largely been removed to create a more open interior. A cellar is located beneath the building.

Facing Duke of York Street, the building forms part of a terrace. The pub front spans three bays and retains three separate entrances. The central entrance is particularly decorative, with double doors containing etched and frosted glass, while large display windows stand on either side. The two outer entrances are also richly decorated and retain lanterns above them that originally housed gas lighting. Across the frontage are the pub's name, ornamental ironwork and a hanging sign depicting a red lion. The upper floors contain sash windows, while the roof level includes dormer windows set into a slate-covered roof with prominent chimney stacks. A painted inscription advertising English ales survives on the upper frontage.

=== Interior ===
The interior in 2007

The interior has been altered from its original layout, with three former bar areas now combined into a single public space, although parts of the dividing screens survive and retain decorative etched glass, including a panel marked "Private Bar". Elements of the former subdivisions remain visible, including an original connecting door retaining coloured and patterned glass. The bar contains an extensive scheme of etched and diamond-cut mirrors in mahogany frames, together with upholstered seating and wall-mounted drinking shelves. At its centre is an original mahogany bar serving both the front and rear rooms, retaining features associated with its historic operation.

Decorative mirrors, carved woodwork and moulded cornices survive throughout the principal rooms, while other notable features include a lincrusta ceiling, brass lighting, and a cast-iron spiral staircase linking the public rooms with the upper floors and cellar. The rear room, formerly a private bar, preserves matching mirror-lined walls and original fittings. The basement retains vaulted beer cellars, while the upper floors contain later residential and service accommodation.

== See also ==
- List of pubs in London
