= Red Lion Borough Historic District =

Historic district in Pennsylvania, United States

- U.S. National Register of Historic Places
- U.S. Historic district
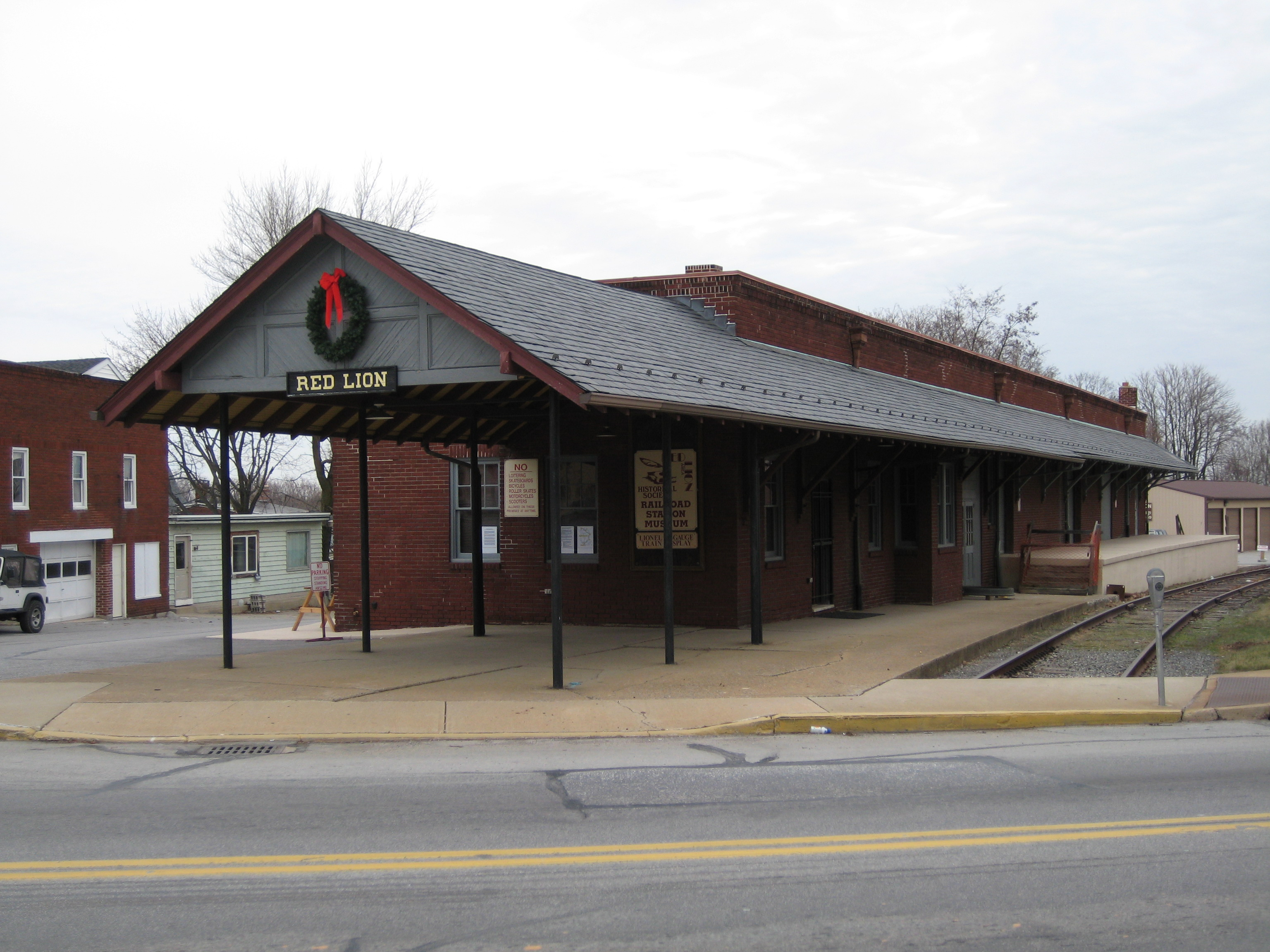
- Maryland and Pennsylvania Railroad station, January 2009

- Location within Pennsylvania Location within the United States
- Location: Roughly bounded by Edgewood Ave., Windsor Twp. line, MD&PA RR., Chestnut Rd., Country Club Rd., and York Twp. line., Red Lion, Pennsylvania
- Coordinates: 39°53′55″N 76°36′35″W
- Area: 260 acres (110 ha)
- Built: 1874
- Architectural style: Colonial Revival, Italianate, et al.
- NRHP reference No.: 00000847
- Added to NRHP: August 10, 2000

The Red Lion Borough Historic District is a national historic district that is located in Red Lion Borough in York County, Pennsylvania.

It was listed on the National Register of Historic Places in 2000.

== History and architectural features ==
This district includes 1,482 contributing buildings, one contributing site, and two contributing structures that are located in the central business district and surround residential areas of Red Lion. Most of the buildings are residential and primarily date between 1880 and 1935, and include notable examples of the Colonial Revival and Italianate styles.

Notable non-residential buildings include the Red Lion Table Company building (1913), the Red Lion Cabinet Company building (1917), the C.H. Foreman cigar factory (1912), the W.M. Gemmell & Company factory (1908-1912), the Consolidated Tobacco Company building (1915), the E.A. Strobeck & Company factory, the Roser Building (1876-1890), Odd Fellows Hall (c. 1885), Sheeler's General Store (1906), Bethany United Brethren Church (1928), the junior-senior high school (1926), Hill School (1910-1912), the U.S. Post Office (1934), and the Maryland and Pennsylvania Railroad Station (1923).

Also located in the district but separately listed is the Consumers Cigar Box Company.

It was listed on the National Register of Historic Places in 2000.
