= The Red Lion, Preston, Hertfordshire =

Pub in Preston, Hertfordshire, UK

The Red Lion
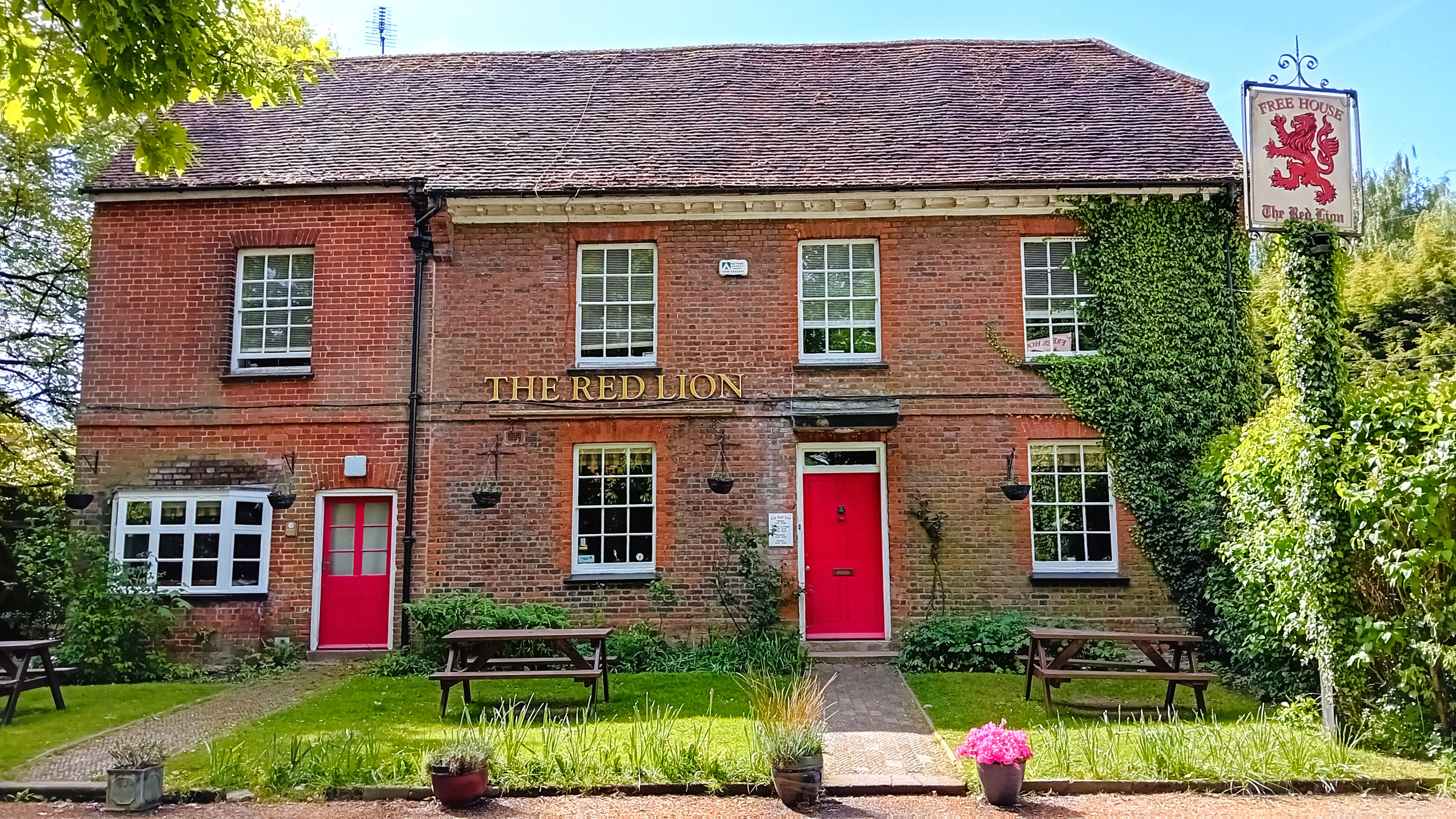
- Interactive map of The Red Lion
- 51.908405°N 0.285507°W
- Location: Preston, Hertfordshire

Site notes
- Website: Official website

Listed Building – Grade II
- Official name: The Red Lion Public House
- Designated: 26 August 1981
- Reference no.: 1102425

The Red Lion is a pub in the village of Preston, outside Hitchin in Hertfordshire, England. It is a grade II listed building, the oldest parts dating from around 1700.

In 1983 the pub was bought by the community from owner Whitbread to preserve it, making it the first community-owned pub in Britain.
