= Red Lion Hill =

Hill in Powys, Wales

- Banc y Dolau
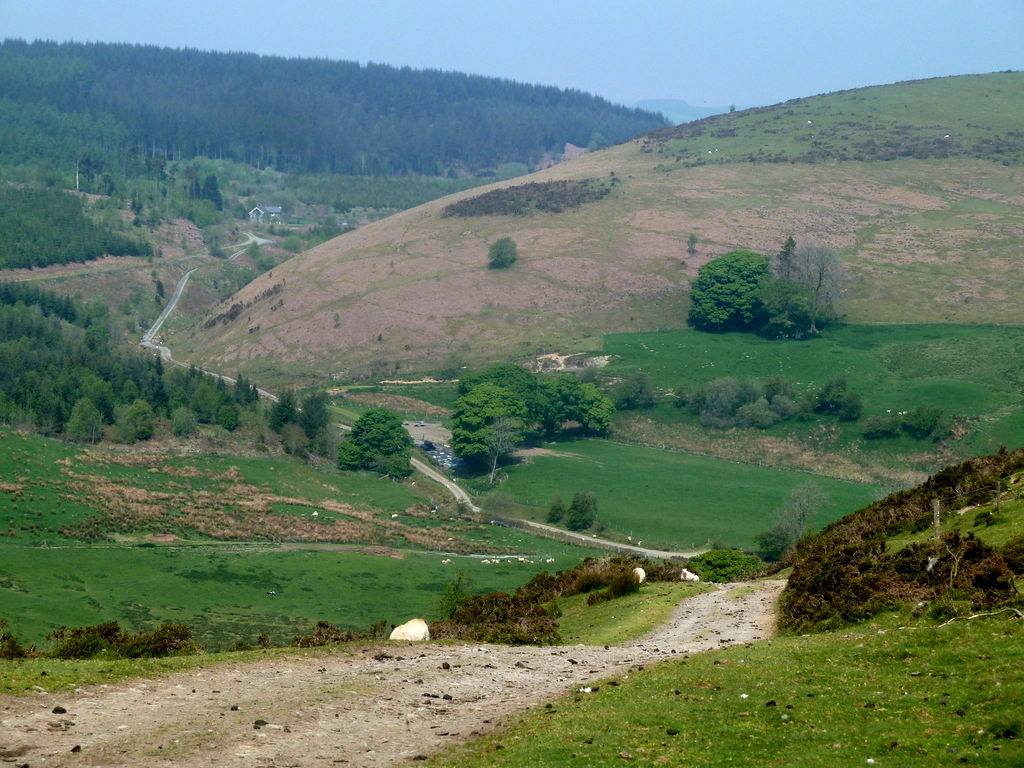
- A view of Red Lion Hill

Highest point
- Elevation: 484.6 m (1,590 ft)
- Coordinates: 52.37970°N 3.38853°W

Naming
- Native name: Bryn Llew Goch (Welsh)

Geography
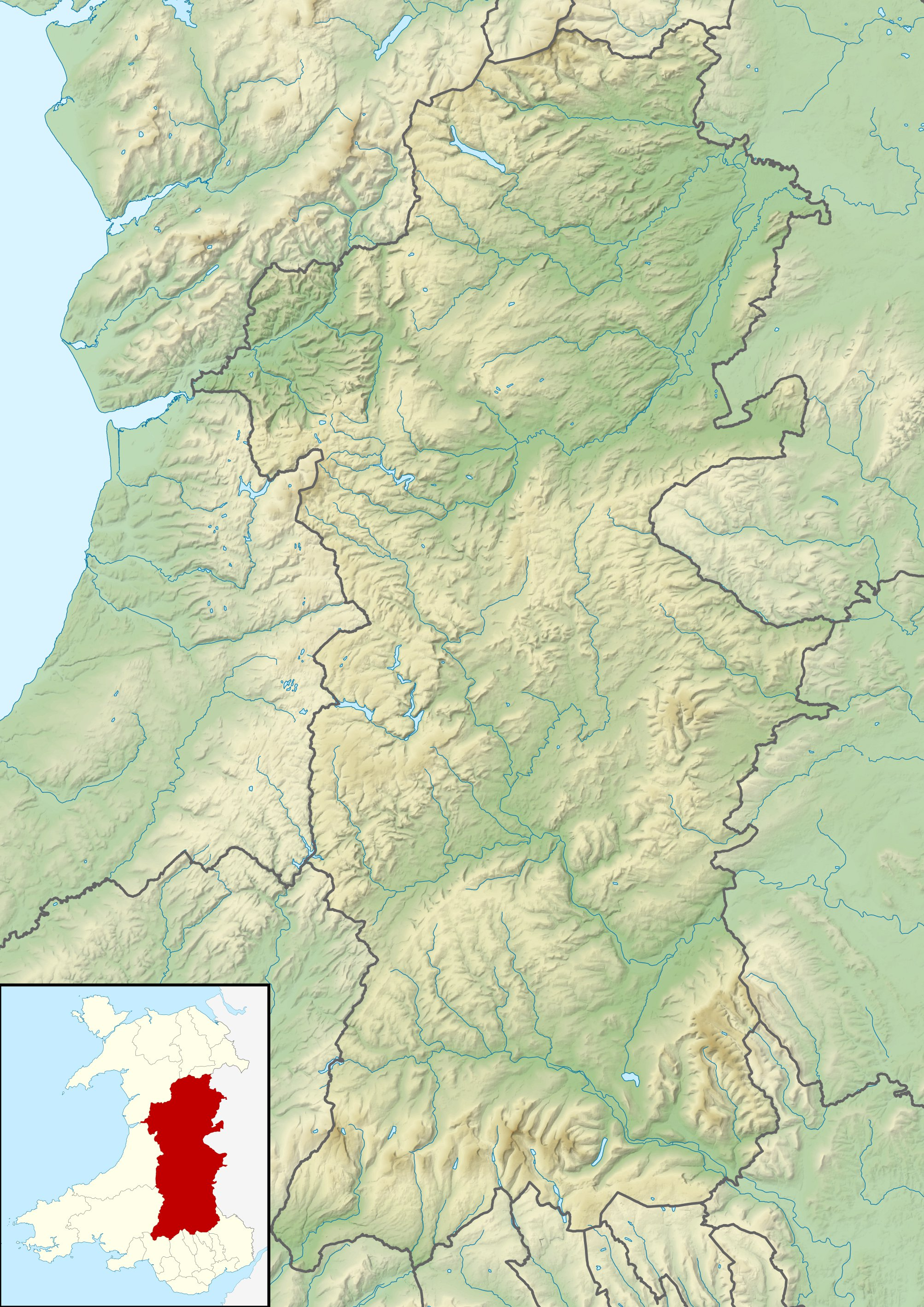
- Location within Powys
- OS grid: SO 0558 7664
- Topo map: OS Explorer 214

Red Lion Hill (Welsh: Bryn Llew Goch) or Banc y Dolau is a hill in Powys, Wales, with a summit 484.6 metres (1,590 ft) above sea level. It is located in Mid Wales between the towns of Newtown and Llandrindod Wells, approximately three point two kilometres (2 mi) to the west of the A483 road.

At the beginning of the twentieth century the area immediately to the east of the hill was known as Red Lion Plantations, and just beyond that was a small hamlet called Red Lion. As of 2020 Red Lion consists of just a single dwelling, which Royal Mail considers to be part of nearby Llanbadarn Fynydd.

A building labelled Red Lion School is shown on the 1st edition Ordnance Survey Map at SO0681576817.
