= Red Lion, Burlington County, New Jersey =

Populated place in Burlington County, New Jersey, US

Red Lion, New Jersey
- Unincorporated community
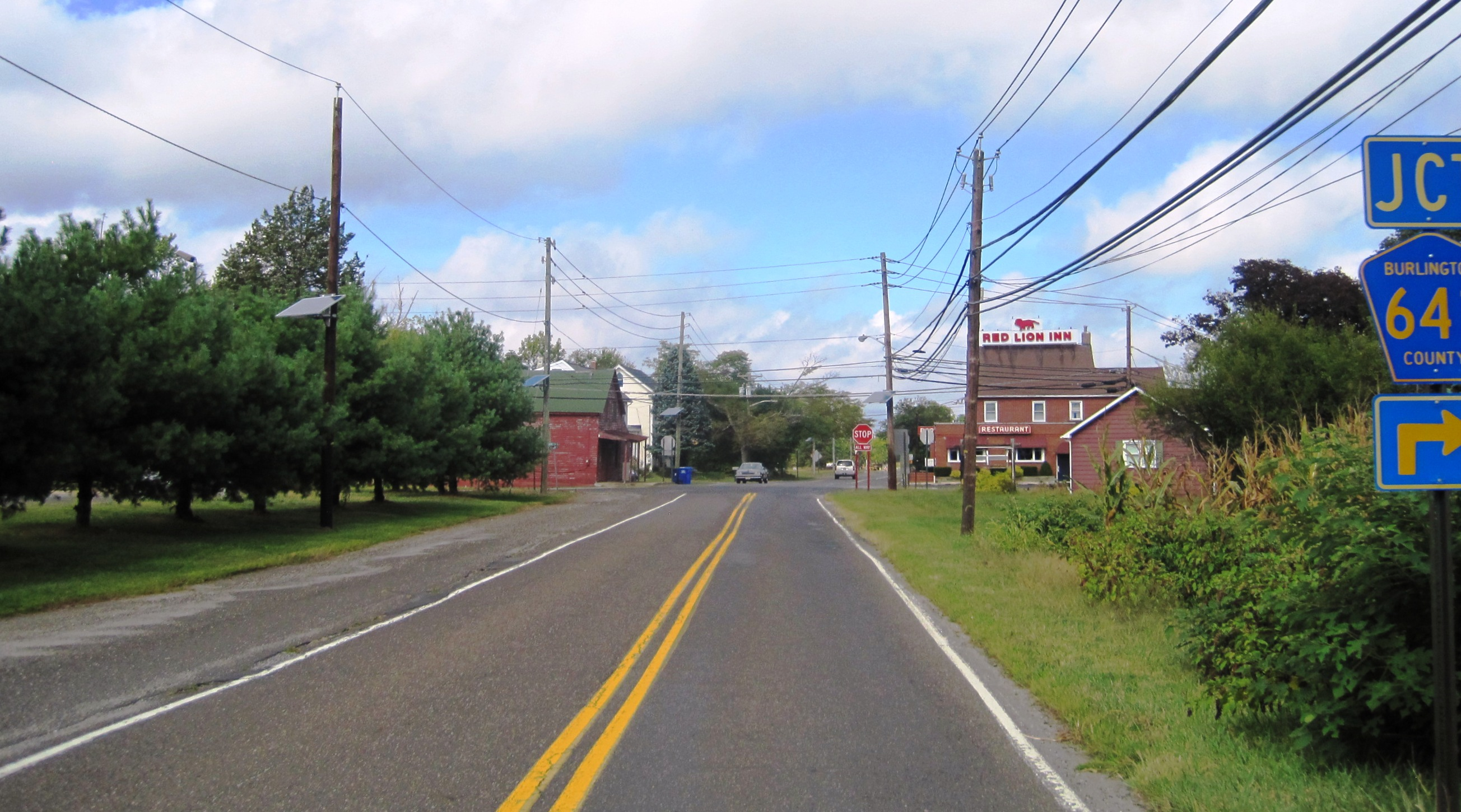
- Looking north along Eayrestown Road approaching Red Lion Road in the center of Red Lion

- Location of Red Lion in Burlington County (Inset: Location of county within the state of New Jersey) Red Lion (New Jersey) Red Lion (the United States)
- Coordinates: 39°53′22″N 74°44′41″W
- Country: United States
- State: New Jersey
- County: Burlington
- Township: Southampton
- Elevation: 62 ft (19 m)
- Time zone: UTC−05:00 (Eastern (EST))
  - Summer (DST): UTC−04:00 (EDT)
- GNIS feature ID: 879636

Red Lion is an unincorporated community located within Southampton Township in Burlington County, in the U.S. state of New Jersey.

Red Lion is home to the Red Lion Inn, a gas station, and a few houses, all located near the Red Lion Circle, within the New Jersey Pine Barrens.

The name, Red Lion, comes from a story about one of the original settlers, a man by the name of Parks, who battled a mountain lion. The lion's coat turned red from its own blood. Mountain lion and black bear were common in the area before being hunted to extinction.
