= The Red Lion, Chipping Barnet =

Pub in Chipping Barnet, London

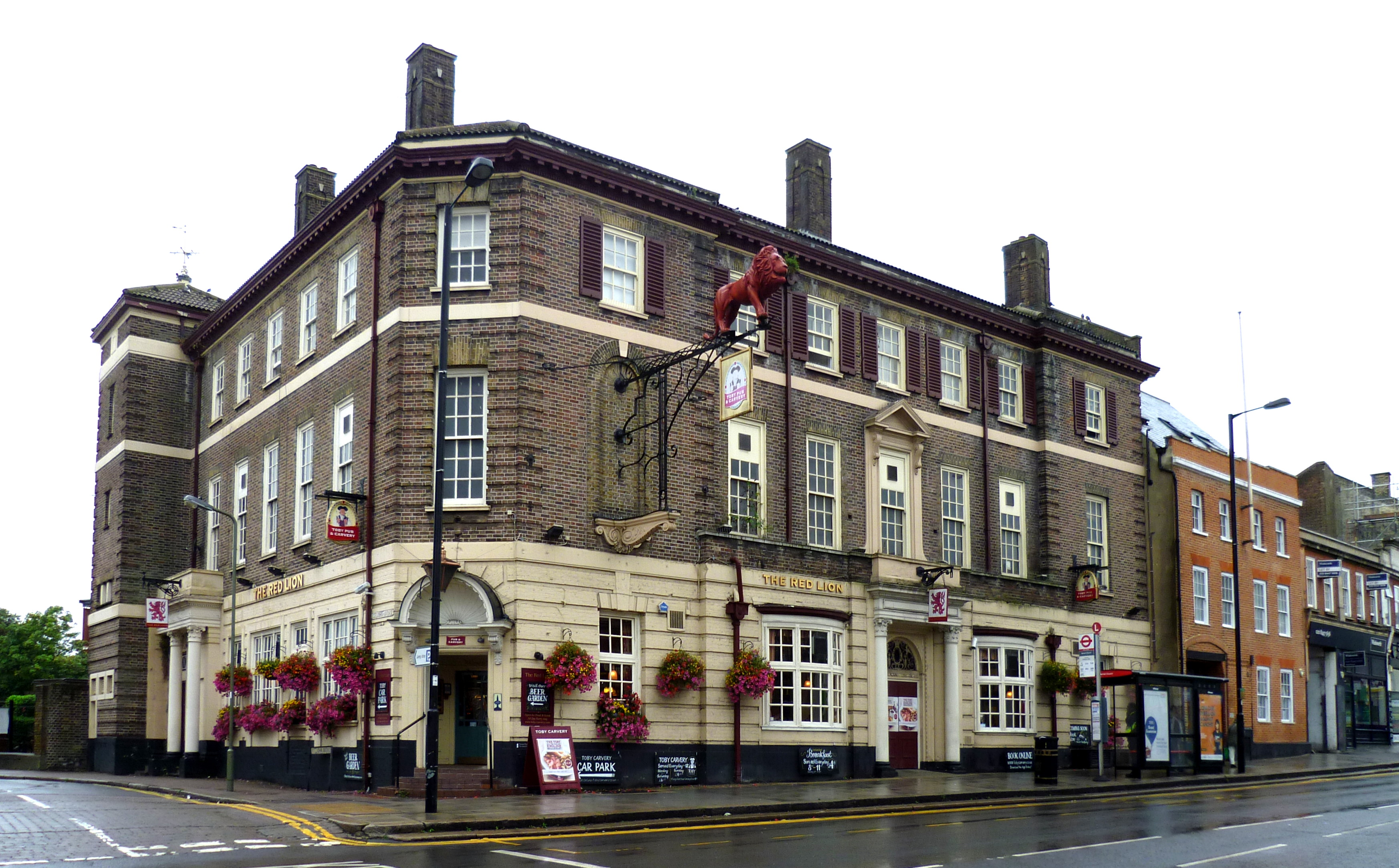
- The Red Lion

- Location within London Borough of Barnet Location within Greater London

General information
- Location: High Street, Chipping Barnet, London, England
- Coordinates: 51.65245°N 0.1990°W

Design and construction
- Designations

Listed Building – Grade II
- Official name: The Red Lion
- Designated: 23 July 2002
- Reference no.: 1061392

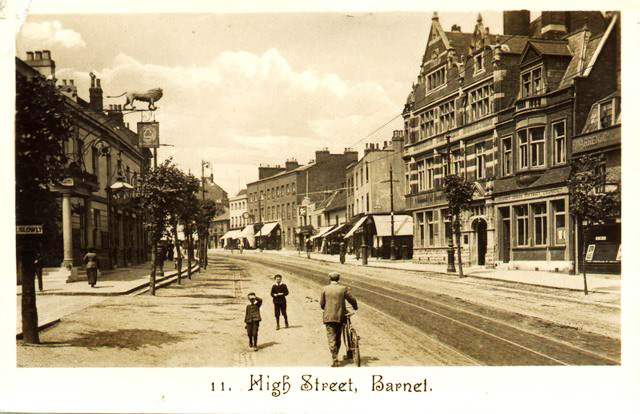
The Red Lion (left) as it once looked.

The Red Lion is a grade II listed public house in the High Street, Chipping Barnet, London.

The pub dates from the 15th century and was one of the coaching inns for which Chipping Barnet was famous. It lies on the Great North Road, of which High Street, Chipping Barnet, forms a part. By 1817, 150 coaches a day were passing through the town. It became the Red Lion Hotel. During the 1980s it was a 'Fun Pub' known as the Dandy Lion, later becoming The Felix and Firkin pub before reverting to The Red Lion. The pub was rebuilt in 1930 by the Meux Brewery to the designs of their in-house architect, William Foster.
