= Old Red Lion, Holborn =

Historic London pub

Coordinates: 51.51810°N 0.11665°W

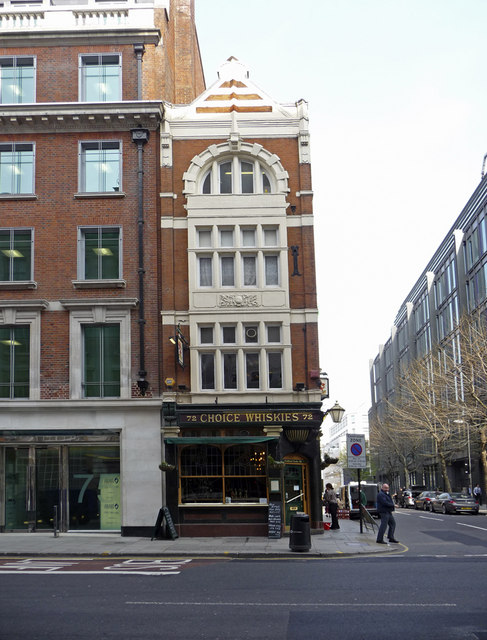
Old Red Lion pub, Holborn

The Old Red Lion is a pub at 72 High Holborn on the corner with Red Lion Street, Holborn, London.

The pub was established by the sixteenth century, and was rebuilt in its present form in 1899, and retains its original Victorian character.

The Red Lyon was the most important inn in Holborn, and Red Lion Street and Red Lion Square are named after it.

According to legend, in 1660, King Charles II had the bodies of Oliver Cromwell and his fellow Roundheads John Bradshaw and Henry Ireton exhumed to stage an execution of their corpses, and the bodies were stored overnight in the pub's yard en route to the gallows at Tyburn. The room upstairs is named the Cromwell Bar.

In 1621, the innkeeper of the Red Lion was indicted for his extortionate prices under statutes of 1389 (13 Rich 2 c.8) and 1402 (4 Hen 4 c.25). He was selling oats at 2s 8d a bushel, a mark-up of around 60% on the market price.
