= 135th (East Anglian) (Hertfordshire Yeomanry) Field Regiment, Royal Artillery =

135th (East Anglian) (Hertfordshire Yeomanry) Field Regiment, RA
- Royal Artillery cap badge
- Active: 7 September 1939–15 February 1942
- Country: United Kingdom
- Branch: Territorial Army
- Role: Field artillery
- Size: 3 Batteries
- Part of: 18th Infantry Division
- Garrison/HQ: Hitchin
- Engagements: Liverpool Blitz; Malayan campaign Fall of Singapore

Commanders
- Notable commanders: Lieutenant-Colonel Philip Toosey

Insignia
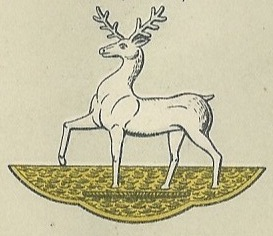
- Hertfordshire Yeomanry collar badge

135th Field Regiment was a Royal Artillery (RA) unit being formed in Britain's part-time Territorial Army (TA) on the outbreak of World War II. Spun off from an existing unit, it took over two batteries from Hertfordshire and Northamptonshire and was later granted the double subtitle '(East Anglian) (Hertfordshire Yeomanry)'. As part of the 18th (East Anglian) Infantry Division the regiment remained in the United Kingdom until 1941 when it was sent to India. The division was deployed to Fortress Singapore where it was captured by the Japanese. Some of the prisoners were murdered in cold blood, many of the others died working on the Burma Railway. The regiment was never reformed.

== Mobilisation ==
With the rapid expansion of the TA after the Munich Crisis, existing units were ordered to form duplicates of themselves. In practice, 86th (East Anglian) (Hertfordshire Yeomanry) Field Regiment contributed to three new RA regiments: 135th Field Rgt, 191st (Hertfordshire and Essex Yeomanry) Field Rgt and 79th (Hertfordshire Yeomanry) Heavy Anti-Aircraft Rgt. In the case of the 135th Field Rgt this was done by combining one of the Hertfordshire Yeomanry batteries with one from another East Anglian field regiment that was being converted to the anti-aircraft (AA) role:

- Regimental Headquarters (RHQ) at Yeomanry House, Hertford, then at 91 Bancroft, Hitchin, from 20 September 1939
- 336 (Northampton) Field Battery at Lincoln Road, Peterborough – from 84th (East Anglian) Field Rgt
- 344 (Hitchin) Field Battery at Bearton Camp, Hitchin – from 86th (East Anglian) (Hertfordshire Yeomanry) Field Rgt

Advance parties of the TA were mobilised on 24 August 1939 and general mobilisation was ordered on 1 September, two days before the outbreak of war. 135th Field Regiment assumed full independence from its parent unit on 7 September. The commanding officer (CO) was Brevet Colonel J. Hudson, MC, TD, a retired TA officer who had previously command 88th (2nd West Lancashire) Field Brigade, RA from 1930 to 1936. The new regiment was assigned to 18th Infantry Division, the duplicate of 54th (East Anglian) Division in which 86th Field Rgt served; 18th Divisional HQ took over responsibility on 30 September.

At this time the establishment of an RA field regiment was two batteries, each of three four-gun Troops. The intention was to equip field regiments with 24 of the new 25-pounder gun-howitzers, but prior to the outbreak of war the four batteries of 86th Field Rgt had been equipped with just 16 4.5-inch howitzers of World War I pattern.

== Service ==
=== Home defence ===
There now followed the period known as the Phoney War. 18th Division moved to Norfolk in November 1939 as a home defence division under the 'Julius Caesar' plan, though it was still badly equipped. RHQ and 336 Bty of 135th Field Rgt were billeted at Kimberley Hall, 344 Bty at Wymondham, with the regiment's four 4.5-inch howitzers at No 5 AA Practice Camp on the coast at Weybourne. 336 Battery moved from the outbuildings of Kimberley Hall to nearby Hingham Hall when the weather turned bad. During March 1940, parties were temporarily sent to man Lewis guns for AA defence on coastal shipping, and 20 volunteers left the regiment to join No. 8 Commando, being formed from units of 18th Division.

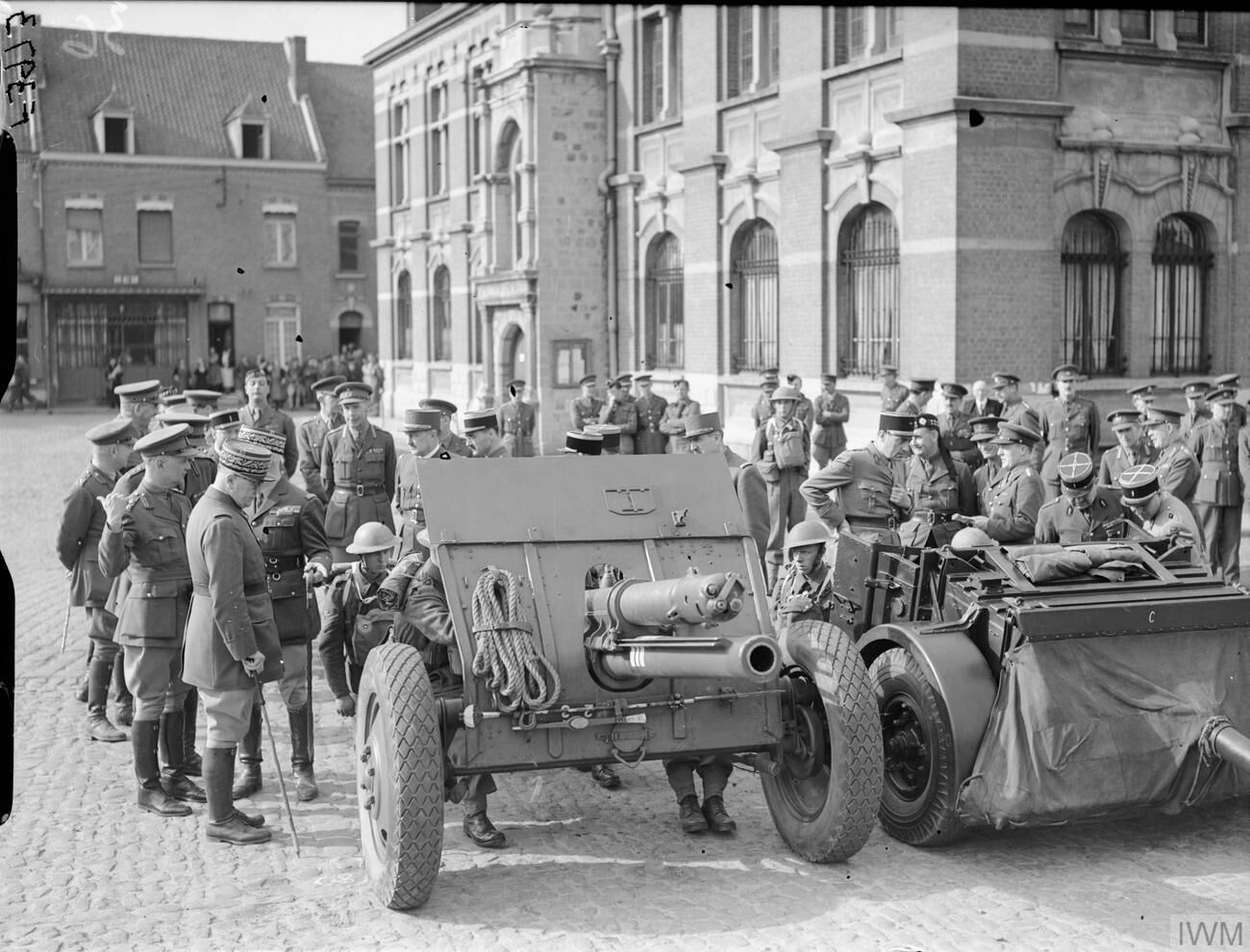
An 18-pounder Mk IIPA gun (this example is being inspected by French officers in April 1940).

When the Battle of France began on 10 May, 18th Division was redeployed for immediate coast defence. 135th Field Rgt and 53rd Infantry Brigade took over the Norfolk coastline between Wells-next-the-Sea and Sheringham. 336 Battery manned the four 4.5-inch howitzers at Weybourne, later at Cley next the Sea, while F Trp of 344 Battery had two 18-pounder Mk II PA guns on pneumatic wheels at Catton. These six guns comprised half of 18th Divisional Artillery's firepower. Those personnel of the regiment not required to man the guns became part of a temporary '18th Divisional Artillery Rifle Regiment' on anti-paratroop duties, while the signallers went to assist the training of 57th (Newfoundland) Heavy Regiment. After the British Expeditionary Force was evacuated from Dunkirk, the regiment exchanged three officers and 57 other ranks (ORs) with 97th (Kent Yeomanry) Field Rgt, which had experience of the fighting in France.

On 24 August 1940 the regiment received additional guns: eight French World War I 75 mm guns, (Note: Probably US-built examples being received at the time under Lend-Lease.) carried Portee on 30-cwt Fordson trucks. These were assigned to A and B Trps of 336 Bty, while C Trp additionally manned some fixed 4-inch naval guns in beach defences. Further 75 mm guns arrived later, so that by mid-September the regiment had its full allocation of guns, albeit extemporised:

- 336 Bty
  - A Trp at Lowes Farm, Holt – 4 x 75mm
  - B Trp at Aylmerton – 4 x 75mm
  - C Trp – 2 x 18-pdrs; 2 x 4-inch
- 344 Bty
  - D Trp – 4 x 18-pdrs (Note: Possibly a mistake for 4.5-inch howitzers.)
  - E Trp – 4 x 75mm
  - F Trp – 4 x 75mm

During September the gunners carried out practice shoots against targets at sea and on the beaches. They also received some training on borrowed 18/25-pounders, after which the two batteries went in succession to West Down on Salisbury Plain to fire the guns there. Meanwhile, the coastal defences had been reinforced by a number of independent Defence Batteries. The first of these was 901 Defence Bty, for which 135th Field Rgt provided a cadre of 64 recently-joined ORs. The battery was commanded by Maj J.R.O'B, Warde, the senior officer transferred from 97th Field Rgt. 901 Independent Defence Bty served on the Norfolk Coast from 1 September 1940 until its disbandment on 3 March 1941.

In November 1940, with winter approaching, the regiment moved back into billets: RHQ at Holt, 336 Bty at West Runton, 344 Bty at Sheringham. It was supporting 222nd Independent Infantry Brigade (Home), a newly-formed coast defence formation attached to 18th Division. The regiment now began to receive its allocation of motor transport, including Quad (4 x 4) gun tractors in preparation for the eventual issue of 25-pdr guns: 336 Bty had 18 Guy Quad-Ants, while 344 Bty had 18 Morris C8s. The regiment also received No 11 wireless sets. It was only now that the RA was producing enough trained battery staffs to begin the process of changing regiments from a two-battery to a three-battery organisation. (Three 8-gun batteries were easier to handle, and it meant that each infantry battalion in a brigade could be closely associated with its own battery.) On 27 November C Trp of 336 Bty and F Trp of 344 Bty were detached to become E and F Trps of a new battery initially designated as C Bty; consequently D and E Trps of 344 Bty were redesignated C and D. Inevitably C Bty now had a mixture of different equipment, and full implementation of the new organisation appears to have been delayed for some months.

=== Mobile training ===
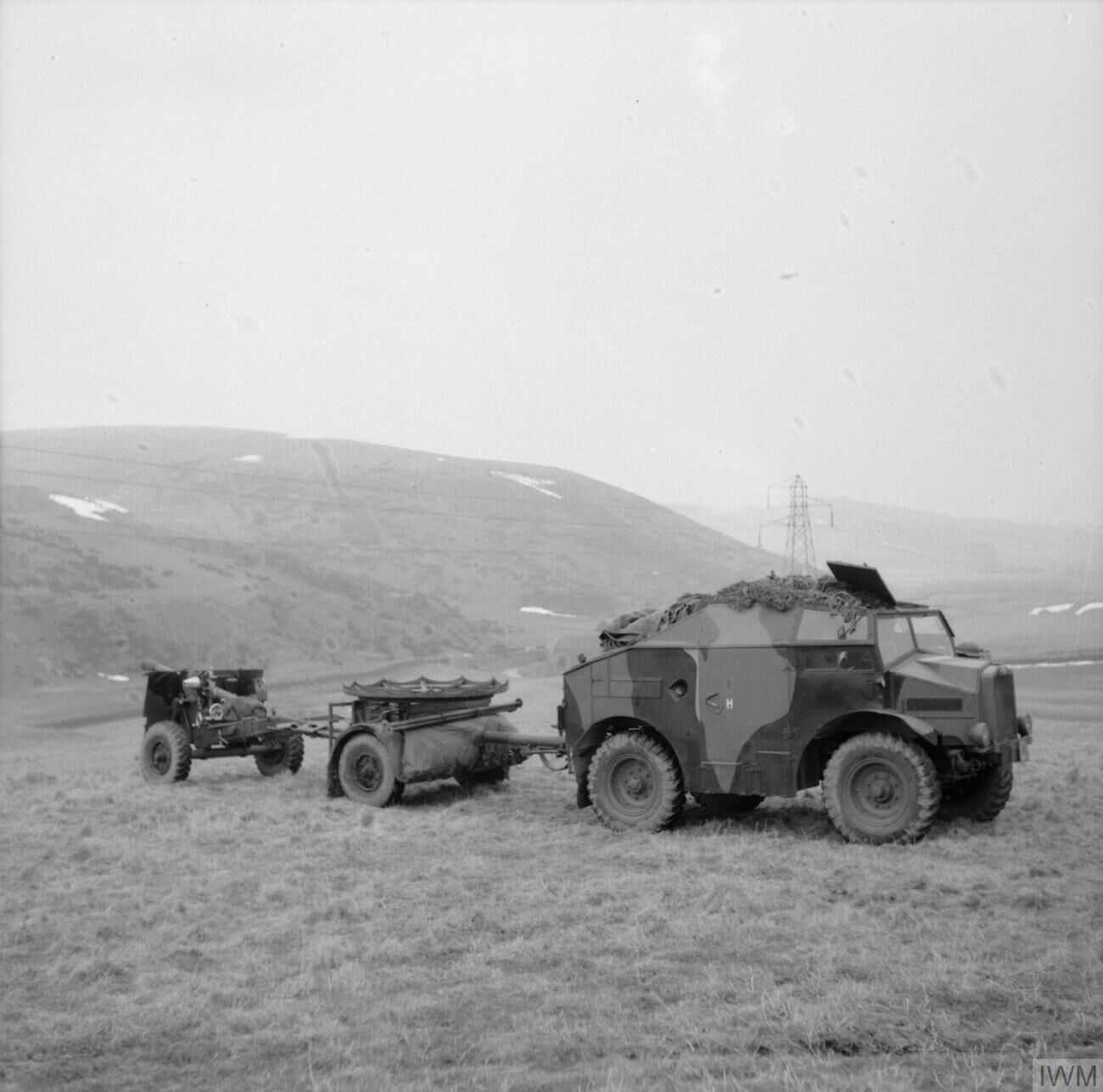
25-pounder gun and Morris C8 tractor (probably of 18th Division) on exercise in Scotland, March 1941.

At the beginning of 1941, 18th Division moved from coastal defence duties to GHQ Reserve and began mobile training for overseas service. On 1 January, 135th Rgt moved to billets between Lockerbie and Annan in Dumfriesshire, Scotland. At the same time parties were sent to the ordnance depot at Donnington in Shropshire to collect the regiment's allocation of 24 Mk II 25-pdrs and limbers. The division trained in the Scottish Borders until the beginning of April, when it moved to Cheshire, with 135th Field Rgt billeted in Macclesfield. The regiment spent a few days at the end of April at No 4 Field Practice Camp at Trawsfynydd in North Wales, where it fired its 25-pdrs for the first time. On 5 May the regiment sent a large party to assist in air raid duties at Liverpool, which had suffered four successive nights of heavy bombing. Two nights later the city suffered one of the worst raids of the Liverpool Blitz and the regiment suffered its first casualties by enemy action, one killed and two seriously injured.

18th Division's insignia, depicting a cartographic symbol for a windmill, appropriate to East Anglia. First issued in the summer of 1941.

The Blitz ended on 16 May and the firewatching party returned to billets. 336 Battery moved to a mill building at Congleton, and later to Knowsley Park. Battle training in North Wales and the Welsh Borders continued during the summer. The provisional C Bty was formally established as 499 Bty on 1 June and its acting commander, Captain O.H. Daltry, promoted to major; Lord de Ramsey became the battery-captain. As the regiment approached readiness, Maj Philip Toosey, was promoted from second-in-command of 59th (4th West Lancashire) Medium Regiment to lieutenant-colonel to succeed LCol Hudson in command of 135th Field Regiment on 1 September 1941. Warning orders to proceed overseas arrived on 22 September.

=== At sea ===
18th Division was earmarked as a reinforcement for Middle East Forces. The men were issued with desert uniforms and sun helmets. The regiment handed in its Guy and Morris Quads and received new Canadian-built Chevrolet CGT Quad gun tractors. It loaded them together with the guns and vehicles (all painted desert sand colour) aboard ship at Liverpool in mid-October. The personnel of the regiment embarked on the SS Sobieski at Gourock on the Firth of Clyde and sailed on 31 October as part of convoy CT5.

The Sobieski took the regiment to Halifax, Nova Scotia, where 135th Field Rgt and 53rd Bde transshipped to the USS Mount Vernon and CT5 sailed on via Port of Spain to Cape Town. Training continued during the voyage. A Troop manned the Bofors 40 mm guns that had been shipped for AA defence, and practised against balloons while at sea. While the convoy was at sea news of the Japanese attacks on Pearl Harbor and Malaya was received. From Cape Town the convoy's destination was changed from the Middle East to India. Then on 23 December the Mount Vernon was detached and sent alone via Mombasa to join a convoy proceeding direct to Malaya.

=== Malayan campaign ===
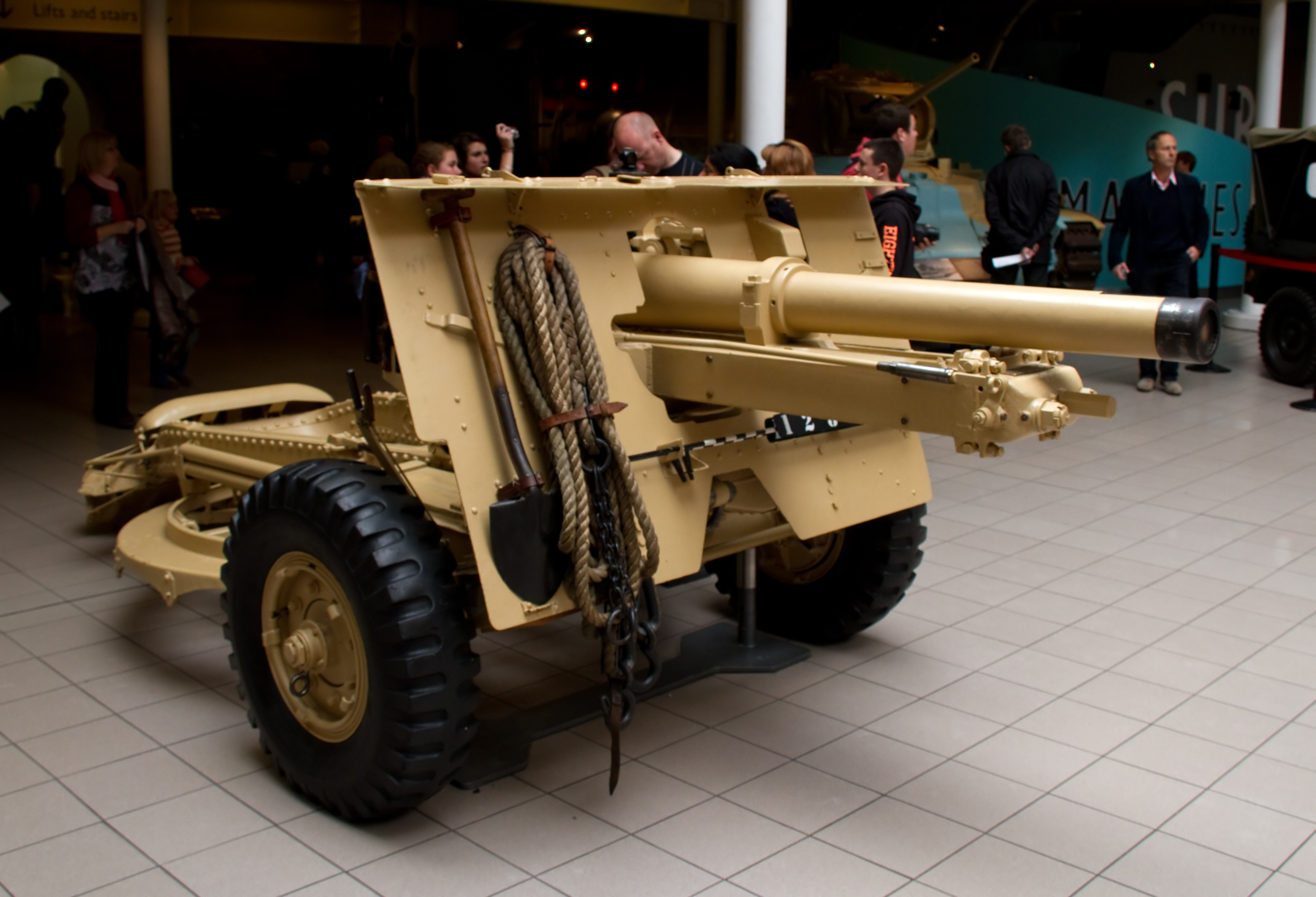
25-pounder Mk II gun preserved at the Imperial War Museum.

The Mount Vernon docked at Singapore on 13 January 1942 and 135th Field Rgt landed during a Japanese air raid. Its guns and equipment were in other ships of CT5 on their way to Bombay, so it had to be re-equipped on arrival with whatever guns were available from the Singapore Ordnance Depot, 336 Battery being issued with eight 4.5-inch howitzers and 344 Bty with eight 25-pdrs, all towed by Chevrolet 4 x 4 1 1/2-ton trucks; 499 Bty remained without guns. A number of officers of the Federated Malay States Volunteers (FMSV) were attached to the regiment to act as interpreters and liaison officers equipped with civilian vehicles as reconnaissance and staff cars. Together with 53rd Bde the regiment was attached to 11th Indian Division.

53rd Brigade was immediately rushed across the Straits of Johore onto the Malay Peninsula to secure the communications of the British (including Indian and Australian) forces retreating from northern Johore against further Japanese landings that were reported on the coast. A reconnaissance ('recce') party from 135th Field Rgt consisting of Lt-Col Toosey and the three battery commanders accompanied the brigade while the guns were being serviced. On the evening of 18 January C Trp took up positions covering the beach near Pontian Kechil, with a 30-strong detachment from 499 Bty for local defence. Next day BHQ and D Trp of 344 Bty under Maj H.M. Peacock deployed in a 'hide' outside Pontian Kechil, supporting 28th Indian Bde on the coast road. The battery established an observation post (OP) on Pulau Pisang island, guarded by a platoon from 2nd Battalion 2nd Gurkha Rifles; the OP was out of wireless range, but Heliograph signalling to the beach position worked well. Meanwhile, on On 20 January, 336 Bty under Maj C.F.W. Banham drove out to the Mount Austin Estate north of Johor Bahru on the road to Kota Tinggi to recce likely anti-tank positions. 499 Battery under Maj Daltry was finally issued with a collection of requisitioned vehicles to tow its guns (8 x 4-5-inch howitzers) and join the rest of the regiment.

The British commander, Lieutenant-General Arthur Percival intended to hold the enemy advance on the line of the Batu Pahat–Ayer Hitam–Kluang–Mersing, with 11th Indian Division holding the Batu Pahat sector. On the night of 23/24 January 336 Bty moved up alongside 344 Bty at its hide at Skudai, while 499 Bty brought its guns up, exchanged E Trp's 4.5s for D Trp's longer-range 25-pdrs, and moved on to Batu Pahat to support 15th Indian Bde. However, the Japanese had already cut the Batu Pahat–Ayer Hitam road and were threatening the coast road to Batu Pahat from Senggarang. 53rd Brigade moved to garrison this road, but 6th Bn Norfolk Regiment, moving up from Rengit to Senggarang with A Trp was ambushed, one of the 4.5-inch howitzers being lost, though Capt T.P. Halford-Thompson got the other into action. A Company of 6th Norfolks with another of A Trp's guns attempted to clear the road, but could only do so temporarily.

It was now clear that the British force would have to retire from Johore towards Singapore Island. On the night of 25/26 January 15th Indian Bde began to withdraw down the coast road towards Senggarang and Benut, picking up the detachments of 53rd Bde as it went. But the road was now blocked by Japanese forces in several places. 11th Indian Division now organised a mixed column under Maj Banham ('Bancol') to re-open the road from Rengit to Senggarang. The two sections of B Trp were ordered to advance by leap-frog bounds so that they could provide continuous fire support for the scratch force of Norfolks and FMSV armoured cars. The armoured cars advanced under fire from both sides of the road until a road bock was encountered and the length of the road came under fire, the infantry being cut down, one howitzer lost and the other saved (together with many wounded) by Bombardier Thompson who turned the gun tractor round in the narrow road. Banham in an Indian Carrier did get through to Senggarang, where he reported the road impassable for wheeled vehicles. The commander of 15th Indian Bde decided to retire to Benut through the mangrove swamps along the shoreline, so A Trp's remaining howitzer was put out of action by dropping the breech-block into the river. Banham, Halford-Thompson and the men of 336 Bty reached Benut late on 27 January. Meanwhile, Rengit was under heavy attack and was overrun during the night of 26/27 January; guns and vehicles were disabled and the survivors made their way to Benut, where they were evacuated by Royal Navy gunboats. Lieutenant Lang of 336 Bty took a party to the mouth of the Benut River and helped boatloads of evacuees.

53rd Brigade HQ at Benut was now effectively the front line, defended by 3rd Bn 16th Punjab Regiment and the two remaining howitzers of B Trp of 336 Bty under Capt J.M. Neal. The brigade was given permission to withdraw during the night of 27/28 January to Pontian Kechil, which was still held by 28th Indian Bde and 344 Bty. The Benut river bridge and 336 Bty's ammunition dump were blown up and 336 Bty withdrew its two guns. On the night of 30/31 January all the troops in Johore withdrew across the causeway onto Singapore Island, Lt-Col Toosey withdrawing his guns by leap-frog bounds to ensure continuous fire support.

=== Defence of Singapore ===
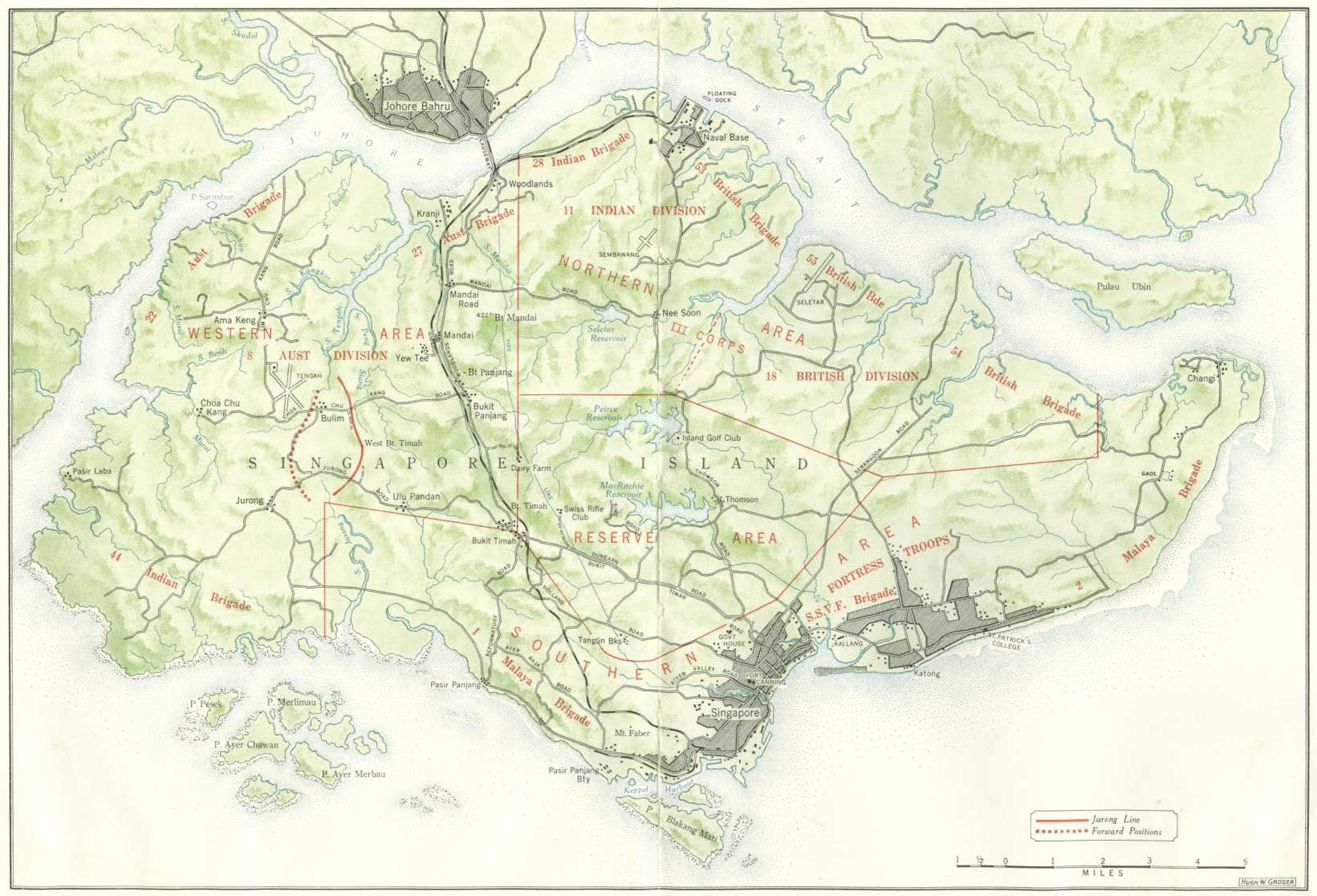
Map of the British deployment for the defence of Singapore Island.

At Singapore, 135th Field Rgt was reunited with its own 25-pounder guns, just arrived with the rest of 18th Division. 336 Battery was the last to refit, due to the casualties it had suffered, and moved into positions near Nee Song on 4 February. The regiment formed part of the Northern Area defences between the Naval Base and the causeway. 499 Battery established an OP in a water tower on the edge of the naval base, whole 344 Bty's was in a partially completed building overlooking the causeway; other forward observation officers (FOOs) were established along the water's edge. 4th (Hazara) Mountain Battery, Indian Artillery, equipped with two 6-inch howitzers, and a section of 273 Anti-Tank Bty armed with 2-pounder guns were attached to 135th Field Rgt on 3 February. On 5 February the Japanese guns moved into position across the straits and the regiment engaged in counter-battery (CB) fire missions against them. Roving sections were used so that the permanent artillery positions were nor revealed to the Japanese. But ammunition was restricted to an average of 20 rounds per gun to conserve stock for a long siege, and this was halved on 7 February. The gun areas, wagon lines and OPs came under Japanese fire and the telephone cables between guns and OPs were frequently cut, but the regiment (with its experience of coast defence deployments in the UK) had duplicated and even quadruplicated some of its links. A joint 135th Field Rgt/4th Mtn Bty OP under an overhanging rock at Bukit Mandai received 25 direct hits but the FOOs (Capt G. Keane, 135th Feld Rgt, and Jemadar Jogindar Singh, 4th Mtn Bty) remained at their posts, bringing down fire on the enemy's gun flashes, and temporarily silencing the guns firing on the naval base.

On the evening of 8 February the Japanese began their landings. The OPs at Bukit Mandai and the water tower reported landing craft and 135th Field Rgt and 4th Mtn Bty dispersed them, but the main landings during the night were on the western side of the island. From there the Japanese advanced towards the causeway and the exposed west flank of 11th Indian Division. On 10 February, 8th Indian Bde was ordered to put in a counter-attack on Point 95 overlooking the causeway with fire support from 135th Field Rgt. At 17.00, after 10 minutes of intense artillery fire (1500 rounds), the infantry were able to walk up the hill entirely unopposed, but they were unable to reach their further objective. 135th Field Rgt fired 7000 rounds that day, and received the personal congratulations from the Commander-in-Chef of ABDA, Sir Archibald Wavell, who was visiting the island.

During the night of 10/11 February the regiment carried out harassing fire (HF) tasks. In the prevailing confusion, a relief of the garrison on Pt 95 was bungled, and it had to be recaptured again in the morning, supported by 135th's guns. By now the Japanese were within three miles of the regiment's gun positions, so 344 and 499 Btys were withdrawn to join 336 Bty at Nee Soon. Next morning the regiment was moved again, changing front to go into action at Sembawang airfield, with 336 Bty and 4th Mtn Bty covering the Mandai Road, 344 covering Thomson Road, and 499 covering Seletar Creek. By now Percival was pulling his troops back to the Singapore City perimeter defences. In the Northern Sector 53rd Bde provided a rearguard at Nee Soon, supported by 366 Bty. As the Japanese advanced to Sembawang airfield they were engaged over open sights by 499 Bty before it withdrew (some rounds fired while the guns were already hooked into the limbers), and three tanks were knocked out by the troop of 273 A/T Bty. However, the order to withdraw did not reach 499 Bty's B Echelon in the wagon lines in a rubber plantation, and the men and vehicles with their FMSV liaison officers were captured in an ambush when they finally pulled out. 366 Battery withdrew from its rearguard after dark but one of its Quad gun tractors broke down, so it was overturned into a monsoon drain and the battery's Bedford 15 cwt wireless truck successfully towed out two limbers and a 25-pounder.

On the morning of 13 February 336 Bty was established on the Balestier road, with A Trp in the open on the polo ground, two of B Trp's guns camouflaged in front gardens and two in garages. 344 Battery finally found suitable positions and came into action in the afternoon. Both troops of 499 Bty placed their guns inside palm-thatch barrack huts, which gave them cover from view, but no cover from incoming fire. With signal cable becoming scarce, 336's telephone exchange was responsible for the whole regiment. Both 11th Indian and 18th Divisions were trying to deploy their artillery in the same small area. Batteries of different regiments were mixed up, and firing in different directions in response to calls. A section of 135th Field Rgt firing over open sights narrowly missed the command post of B Trp, 155th (Lanarkshire Yeomanry) Field Rgt.

The whole city and defence perimeter were now under shellfire and air attack, and it was clear that the defence was nearly ended. Toosey was now ordered to join the evacuation of key personnel and cadres from Singapore, but he refused (quoting the Artillery Training manual) so that he could remain with his men during their impending captivity. Major Daltry was placed in command of 135th Field Rgt's cadre but he was seriously wounded on the dockside and it was left to Battery Sergeant Major Waldock to lead the 12-strong party, which escaped on 15 February in a small boat to Sumatra and then to Ceylon. Toosey was later awarded the Distinguished Service Order for his heroism and leadership during the defence of Singapore.

On the morning of 14 February Battery Quartermaster Sergeant Cluff of 499 Bty's B Echelon made his way through the regiment's own fire to the forward RHQ. He brought a message from their captors that the prisoners would be executed if the British did not surrender immediately. Cluff was passed up to the RA HQ and his message sent to Malaya Command HQ. On the expiry of the implied 24 hour deadline, the prisoners (11 of 499 Bty and two FMSV liaison officers) were shot and bayoneted. Amazingly two of the gunners survived, one making his way back to British lines, the other looked after by a Chinese family until he rejoined about a week after the surrender.

Firing continued throughout 14 February, with 11th Indian and 18th Divisions holding their ground, but field gun ammunition was running short and the city's water supply breaking down. In the evening the regiment was warned of Japanese tanks attacking, and Sergeant Hughes's gun of B Trp was detached and placed in an anti-tank role facing north on Balestier Road. However, the attack did not materialise, but infantry fighting continued through the night. The following day a ceasefire was arranged; initially the British agreed to hand over all their guns, but orders arrived from ABDA that they were to be destroyed. 336 Battery did this by putting a shell in the breech, another in the barrel, and then pulling the firing lever from a safe distance using Trolleybus wire. They later assured their captors that the damage was due to Japanese shelling.

135th Field Regiment went into captivity on 16 February. It was officially authorised on 17 February 1942 to use the same '(East Anglian) (Hertfordshire Yeomanry)' subtitles used by its parent unit, but it had already been destroyed before this could take effect. No attempt was made to reform the regiment in India on the basis of BSM Waldock's cadre.

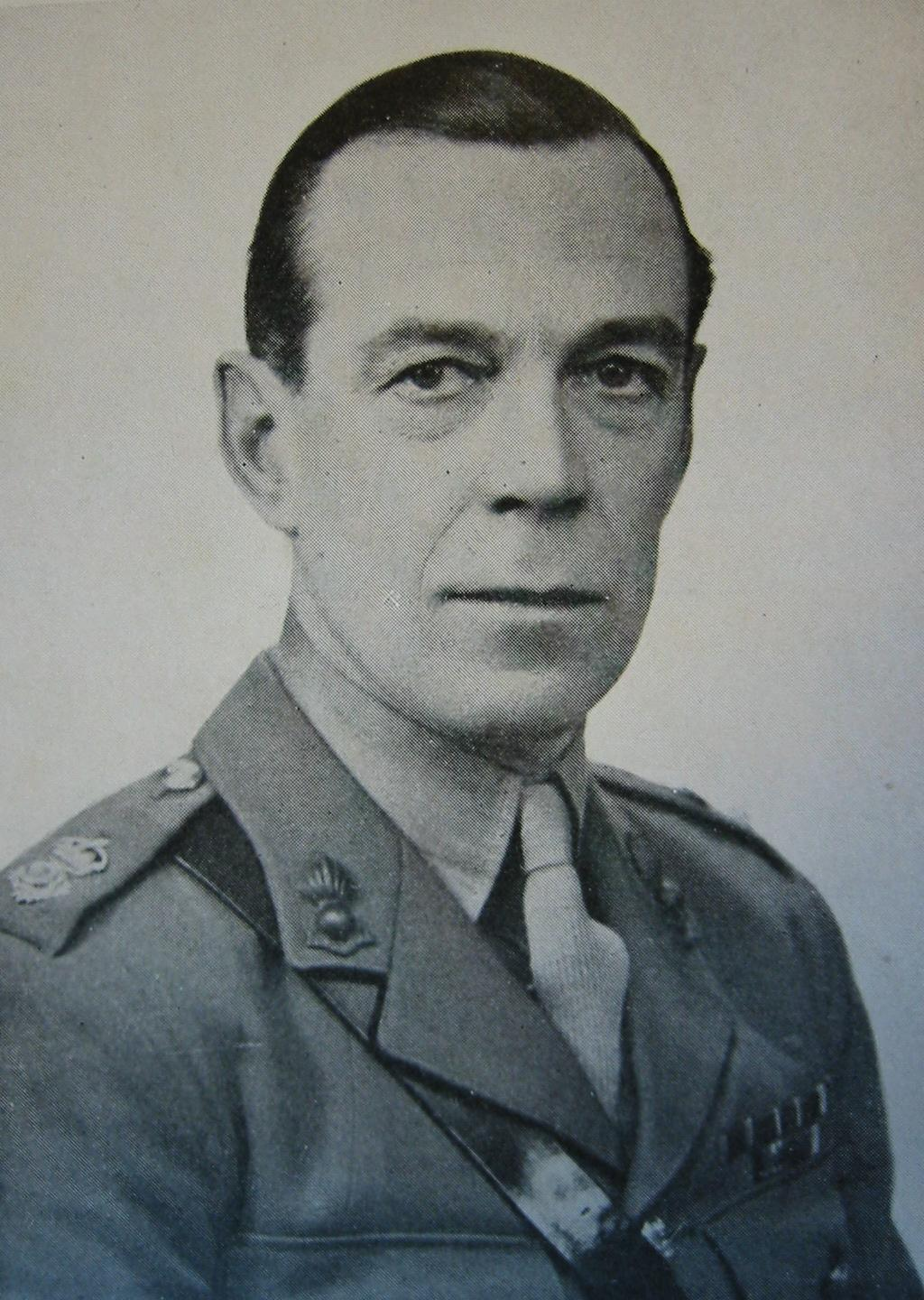
Photograph of Philip Toosey taken in 1942

=== Bridge on the River Kwai ===
The men were imprisoned in Selarang Barracks at Changi, converted into a Prisoner-of-war camp. In June 1942, 500 men of 135th Field Rgt were sent to Sime Road Camp to work as labourers on a Japanese war memorial, some of the others remaining at Changi during the notorious Selarang Barracks incident. In October a party of 18th Division prisoners, including about 400 of 135th Field Rgt, was sent to Thailand to work on the Wan Po viaduct across the Mae Klong river on the Burma Railway. Toosey was the senior Allied officer in the PoW camp at Tha Maa Kham (known as Tamarkan) that housed the men building the bridge. This was described in a book by Pierre Boulle and later in the Oscar-winning film The Bridge on the River Kwai in which Alec Guinness played the senior British officer. Both the book and film outraged former prisoners because Toosey did not collaborate, unlike the fictional Colonel Nicholson.

The men of 135th Field Rgt were progressively split up as the work on the railway was completed in 1943 and parties of PoWs were moved to other labouring jobs in Thailand, Formosa and Japan.

The Far East prisoners of war were released after the Surrender of Japan in August 1945. During and immediately after the war 135th Field Regiment lost 67 men killed in action or died of wounds, and a further 159 died while prisoners of the Japanese, including those lost at sea in transit to Japan, those killed in Allied bombing of installations close to their camps, and some whose aircraft crashed while being repatriated after the Japanese surrender. Officially 135th (East Anglian) (Hertfordshire Yeomanry) Field Regiment was disbanded on 1 January 1947, but the regiment regarded the remembrance service held in December 1945 as its final parade.

== Insignia ==
When the Hertfordshire Yeomanry was transferred to the Royal Artillery in 1920 as part of what became 86th Field Rgt, it was obliged to adopt the RA cap badge, but the whole of the 86th retained the Herts Yeomanry's hart badge as a collar badge and on undress caps, officers also wearing it beneath the rank badges on their shoulder straps. Although its titular link to the Yeomanry was not authorised until after its capture, 135th Field Rgt kept up this tradition. When a representative detachment of the regiment was inspected by King George VI before sailing to Singapore, the officers had defied orders to remove all distinguishing badges, and had continued to wear the Hertfordshire Yeomanry badge on their shoulder straps. The King was reported to have said 'Good, I am glad to see that you are still wearing it and I hope you will continue to do so'. The Commonwealth War Graves Commission (CWGC) design for headstones for members of 135th Field Rgt includes both the RA and Hertfordshire Yeomanry badges.

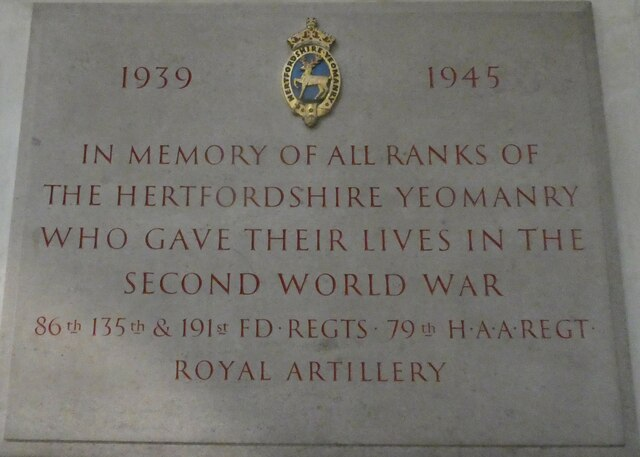
Herts Yeomanry 1939–1945 memorial.

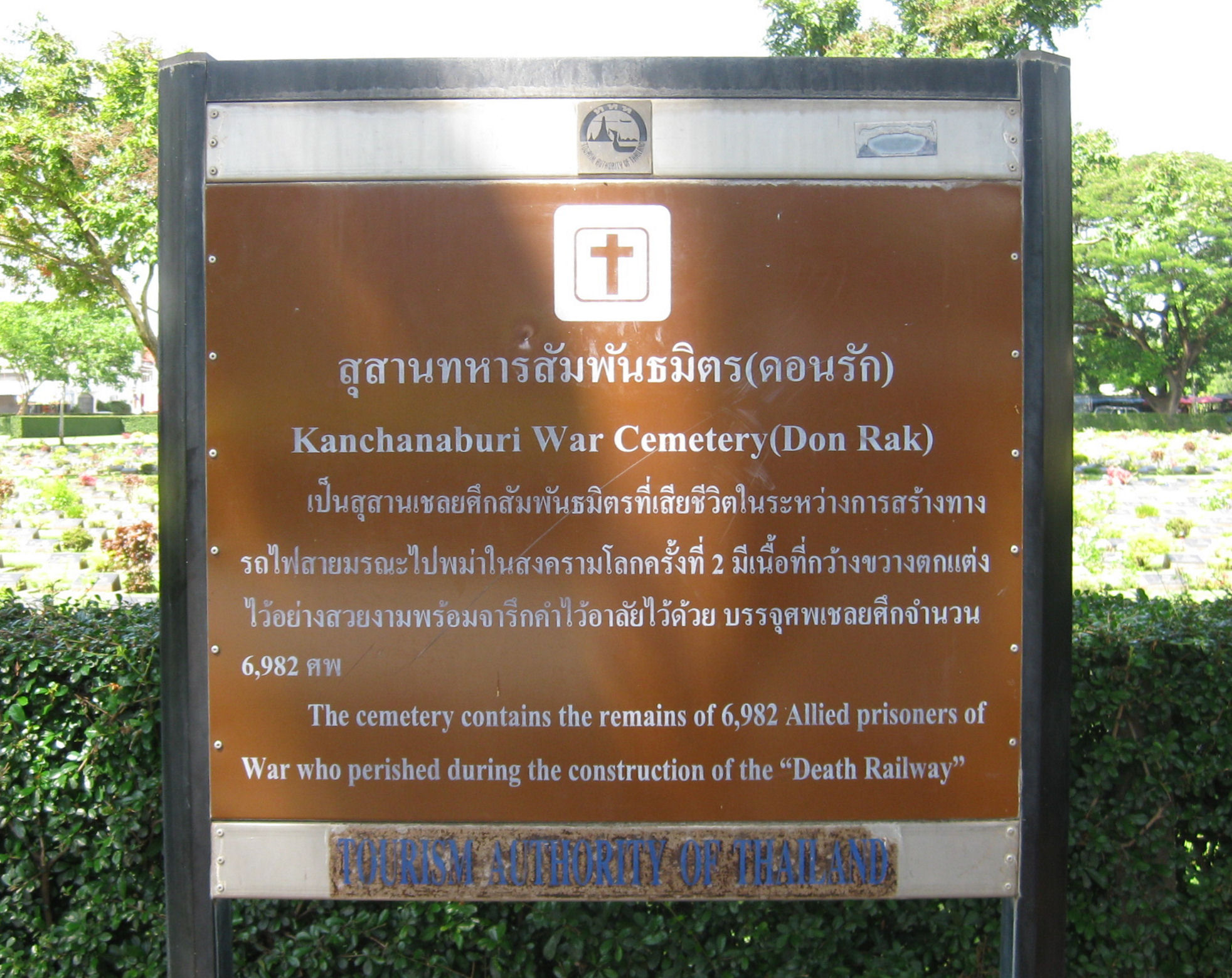
CWGC cemetery at Kachanaburi, Thailand, where many of those who died on the Burma Railway are buried.

== Memorials ==
A stone tablet commemorating the men of all four Hertfordshire Yeomanry artillery regiments who died during World War II was unveiled on 19 September 1954 in the War Memorial Chapel of St Albans Cathedral.

In 1956 Lady de Ramsey created a Lady Chapel at the Church of St Thomas à Becket, Ramsey, as a thanksgiving gift for the safe return of her husband from a Japanese PoW camp.

Fragments from the Burma Railway are included in the Far East Prisoners of War Memorial in St Martin-in-the-Fields, London. A memorial consisting of original rails and sleepers from the Burma Railway was installed at the National Memorial Arboretum at Alrewas, Staffordshire, in 2002. A Far East Prisoners of War Memorial Building was also erected at the Arboretum in 2005.

A memorial to those prisoners who died in the construction of the Burma Railway was erected in Camden High Street, London, in 2012.

== See also ==
- Hertfordshire Yeomanry
- 86th (East Anglian) (Hertfordshire Yeomanry) Field Regiment, Royal Artillery
- Northamptonshire Battery, Royal Field Artillery
