= Highbury (disambiguation) =

Highbury is a suburb of north London, England.

Highbury may also refer to:

== Australia ==
- Highbury, Queensland, a locality in the Shire of Mareeba
- Highbury, South Australia
- Highbury, Western Australia
- Highbury, Centennial Park, a heritage-listed private house in Sydney

== Canada ==
- Highbury Avenue in London, Ontario

== New Zealand ==
- Highbury, Palmerston North, suburb of Palmerston North
- Highbury, Auckland, suburb of Auckland
- Highbury, Wellington, suburb of Wellington

== South Africa ==
- Highbury Preparatory School, a boys' school in Hillcrest

== United Kingdom ==
- Arsenal Stadium, located in Highbury, London, was often also referred to simply as Highbury
- Highbury, Hampshire, an area of Portsmouth
- Highbury, Somerset, a location
- Highbury, Birmingham, a mansion in Birmingham, West Midlands
- Highbury Stadium, Fleetwood, a football stadium in Lancashire
- Highbury C.C., a cricket club which was based in Leeds, between 1946 and 2004
- Highbury (Islington ward), an electoral ward in London
- Hitchin Highbury (ward), an electoral ward in Hertfordshire
