= Florence Davy Thompson =

English-born Canadian biologist

Florence Davy Thompson (née Lucas; 1865–1915) was an English-born Canadian biologist, artist and the founding librarian at the University of Manitoba.

== Early life ==
She was born on 13 September 1865 to Samuel Lucas and Florence Davy in Hitchin, Hertfordshire, where her father owned a brewery. Her mother was the daughter of the American consul in Leeds, and arranged for her own daughter to receive a superb education from a private tutor, William Dawson. In 1892 she married customs clerk William Henry Thompson and moved with him to Winnipeg, Manitoba.

== Career in Winnipeg ==
On arriving in Canada, she demonstrated her artistic talent, winning prizes for her watercolour paintings at the 1892 Winnipeg Industrial Exhibition. (Her grandfather, named Samuel Lucas like her father, had been well-regarded in England for his painting.)

Thompson collaborated with professors at the University of Manitoba and the Manitoba Medical College, writing and illustrating scientific treatises. In 1906 and 1907 she published four papers on pancreatic islets with professor Swale Vincent and in 1909 she worked on a paper on thyroid and parathyroid glands with professor Jasper Halpenny. She published two more physiology papers as sole author.

The faculty of the university were anxious to establish a library and, in 1905 Vincent was asked to lead that effort. In 1908 the library was established and Thompson was made the librarian, but with an honorarium of only $100 rather than the $1,000 Vincent had recommended. In 1910 (by which time her salary had increased to $900) she travelled to McGill University in Montreal to further develop her skills.

In addition to her scientific writing, Thompson presented papers to women's clubs on topics as diverse as furniture and lace-making. She was active in the Local Council of Women, the Women's Canadian Club, and University Women's Club.

Thompson died suddenly of appendicitis in 1915. At the time of her death the library's collection had expanded to over 7,500 works. The man who would be hired to replace her as university librarian in 1916 was paid $2,000.

== See also ==
- University of Manitoba Libraries
