= Samuel Lucas (disambiguation) =

Samuel Lucas (1811–1865) was abolitionist and newspaper editor.

Samuel Lucas may also refer to:

- Samuel Lucas (1805–1870), British amateur painter and brewer
- Sam Lucas (1848–1916), American actor
