= Hitchin =

Market town in Hertfordshire, England

Coordinates: 51.947°N 0.283°W

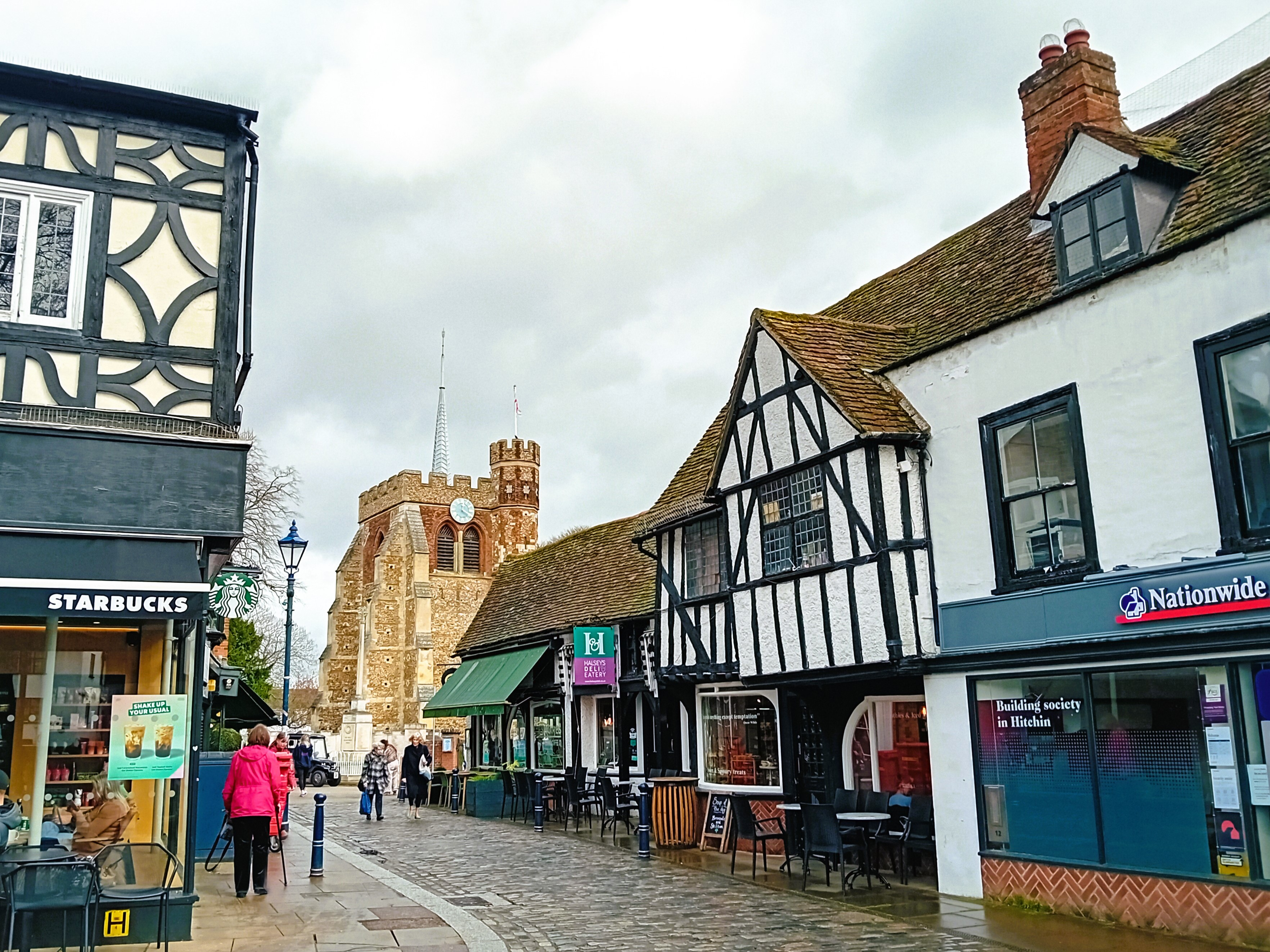
- View from Market Square in Hitchin, with St Mary's Church in the background

- Location within Hertfordshire
- Population: 35,220 (Built up area, 2021)
- OS grid reference: TL181292
- District: North Hertfordshire
- Shire county: Hertfordshire
- Region: East
- Country: England
- Sovereign state: United Kingdom
- Post town: HITCHIN
- Postcode district: SG4, SG5
- Dialling code: 01462
- Police: Hertfordshire
- Fire: Hertfordshire
- Ambulance: East of England
- UK Parliament: Hitchin

Hitchin (/ˈhɪtʃɪn/) is a market town in the North Hertfordshire district of Hertfordshire, England. The town dates from at least the 7th century. It lies in the valley of the River Hiz at the north-eastern end of the Chiltern Hills. It is 16 miles (26 km) north-west of the county town of Hertford, and 35 miles (56 km) north of London. The population at the 2021 census was 35,220.

Hitchin grew around a market place and the adjoining parish church of St Mary on the western bank of the River Hiz. At the southern end of the town centre is Hitchin Priory, a former monastery dating back to 1317, which was partially rebuilt into a large country house with extensive parkland following the dissolution of the monasteries. The ancient parish of Hitchin covered a large rural area as well as the town itself, including several hamlets which subsequently became separate parishes, including Langley, Preston, St Ippolyts, and Walsworth.

The town's economy was historically based on serving as the market town for the surrounding agricultural area, which was primarily arable with some sheep farming. Lavender has long been grown in the fields around the town, and an early industry in the town was lavender distilleries.

The Great Northern Railway built its main line from London King's Cross to York through the town; Hitchin railway station opened with the line in 1850. The Cambridge line opened shortly afterwards, diverging from the main line just north of Hitchin, which therefore became an important junction station. The A1(M) motorway passes Hitchin a short distance to the east. The town's historic character and accessibility make it popular with commuters.

== History ==
The ancient Icknield Way runs just north of Hitchin, passing through the neighbouring village of Ickleford.

Hitchin is first noted as the central place of the Hicce people, a tribe holding 300 hides of land as mentioned in a 7th-century document, the Tribal Hidage. Hicce, or Hicca, may mean the people of the horse. The tribal name is Old English and denotes a Middle Anglian people.

It has been suggested that Hitchin was the location of 'Clofesho', the place chosen in 673 by Theodore of Tarsus the Archbishop of Canterbury during the Synod of Hertford, for the first meeting of representatives of the fledgling Christian churches of Anglo-Saxon England, who were to hold annual synods of the churches as Theodore attempted to consolidate and centralise Christianity in England.

By 1086 Hitchin is described as a Royal Manor in the Domesday Book: the feudal services of avera and inward, usually found in the eastern counties, especially Cambridgeshire and Hertfordshire, were due from the sokemen, but the manor of Hitchin was unique in levying inward. Evidence has been found to suggest that the town was once provided with an earthen bank and ditch fortification, probably in the early tenth century but this did not last. The modern spelling of the town first appears in 1618 in the "Hertfordshire Feet of Fines".

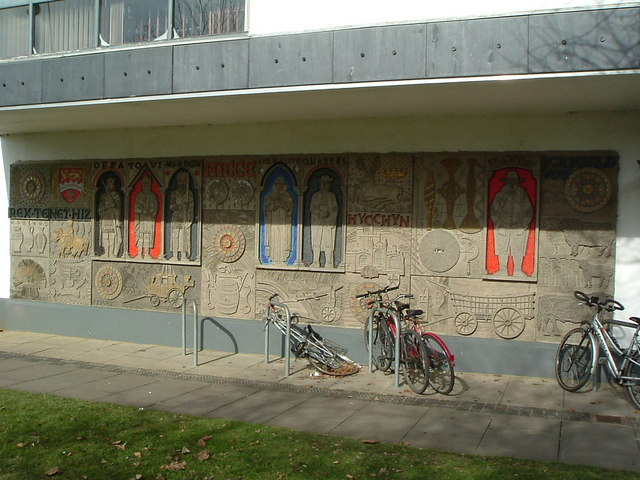
Panel representing the foundational history of Hitchin mentioning: King Offa, the River Hiz and the Hicce tribe. Now on the front of Hitchin Library.

The name of the town also is associated with the small river that runs through it, most picturesquely in front of the east end of St. Mary's Church, the town's parish church. The river is noted on maps as the River Hiz. Contrary to how most people now pronounce the name, that is to say as spelt, the 'z' is an abbreviated character for a 'tch' sound in the Domesday Book (as in the name of the town). It would have been pronounced 'River Hitch'. The Hicca Way is an eight-mile (thirteen-kilometre) walking route along the River Hiz Valley, believed to have been used for trade between the Danes and English in the Anglo-Saxon age. It is also likely that Hitch Wood, which lies some six miles (ten kilometres) south of the town also derives its name from the Hicce tribe, who gave their name to Hitchin.

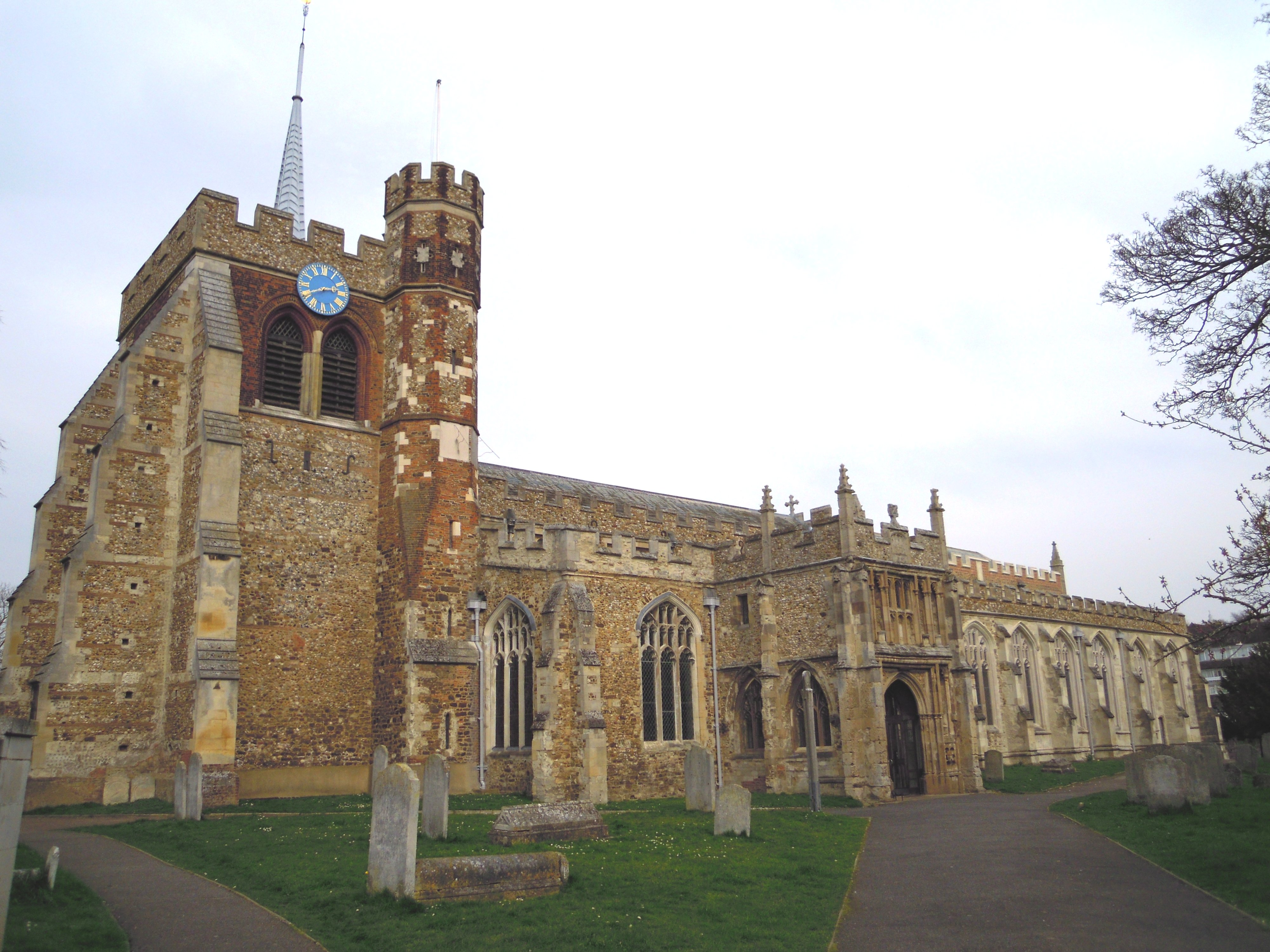
St Mary's, the Hitchin parish church

St Mary's Church is remarkably large for a town of its size and was once a minster. The size of the church is evidence of how Hitchin prospered from the wool trade. It is the largest parish church in Hertfordshire. Most of the church dates from the 15th century, with its tower dating from around 1190. During the laying of a new floor in the church in 1911, foundations of a more ancient church building were found. In form, they appear to be a basilican church of a 7th-century type, with a later enlarged chancel and transepts, perhaps added in the 10th century. This makes the church older than the story (not recorded before the 15th century) that the church was founded by Offa, king of Mercia 757-796.

In 1697, Hitchin (and the nearby village of Offley) were subject to what is thought to have been the most severe hailstorm in recorded British history. Hailstones over 4 inches in diameter were reported.

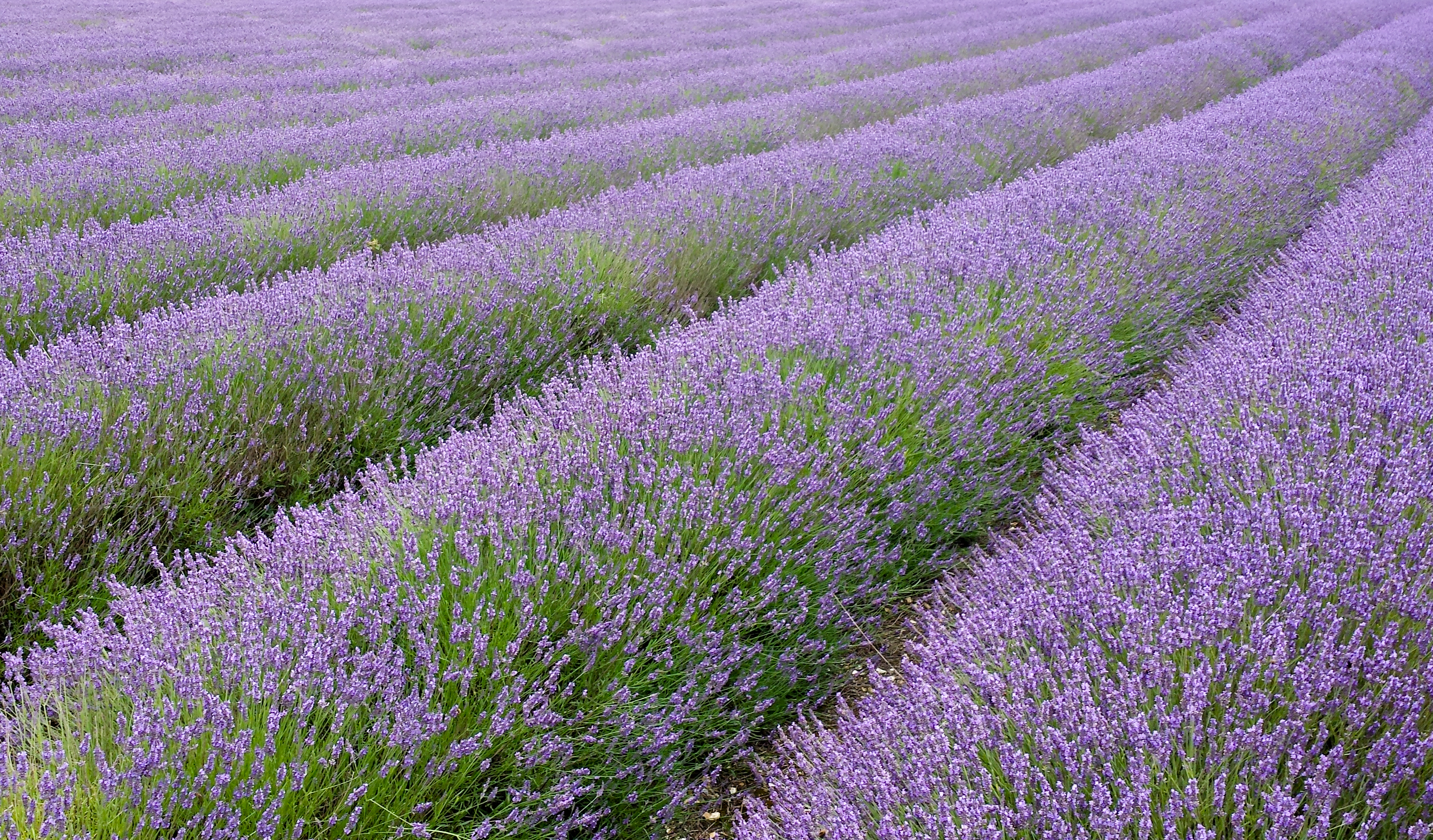
Lavender fields near Hitchin

In the High Medieval Period the town was surrounded by open arable fields, divided into shotts and narrow strips, that survived into the early 19th century. The town flourished on the wool trade, the sheep being pastured on the high hills to the south. By the 17th century the town was a staging post for coaches coming from London. By the middle of the 19th century, the railway had arrived, and with it a new way of life for Hitchin. Hitchin established itself as a major centre for grain trading after the Corn Exchange was built in the market place in 1853. Hitchin was also a centre for manufacturing products from the lavender which was cultivated in the surrounding area, with multiple lavender distilleries operating in the town.

The latter half of the 20th century also brought great changes in communication to Hitchin. Motorways have shortened journey times and brought Luton, a few miles away on the M1, and the A1 (M) even closer. By the close of the 20th century, Hitchin had developed strong commuter interest being midway between London and Cambridge. Hitchin also developed a fairly strong Sikh community based around the Walsworth area.

During the medieval period, both a priory (Newbigging, now known as The Biggin) and a friary (now known as Hitchin Priory) were established, both of which closed during Henry VIII's Dissolution of the Monasteries. They were never reformed, although The Biggin was for many years used as almshouses.

The British Schools Museum in Hitchin is home to the world's only surviving complete Lancasterian Schoolroom, which was built in 1837 to teach boys by the Lancasterian method (peer tutoring).

Girton College – a pioneer in women's education – was established on 16 October 1869 under the name of College for Women at Benslow House in Hitchin, which was considered to be a convenient distance from Cambridge and London. It was thought to be less 'risky' and less controversial to locate the college away from Cambridge in the beginning. The college moved to Cambridge a few years later and adopted its present name, Girton College.

== Governance ==
Hitchin is in the district of North Hertfordshire. There is no town council in Hitchin, which is an unparished area, administered directly by North Hertfordshire District Council, with higher order functions provided by Hertfordshire County Council. Residents elect 13 members to the North Hertfordshire District Council. There are five electoral wards in Hitchin: Bearton, Highbury, Oughton, Priory and Walsworth. The 13 Hitchin councillors on the district council meet as the Hitchin Committee.

The town is represented in Parliament by the constituency of Hitchin. The incumbent Labour Party MP for the former Mid Bedfordshire constituency Alistair Strathern was elected in 2024. Before 1997 Hitchin was included in the constituency of North Hertfordshire. From 1997–2024 it was in the constituency of Hitchin and Harpenden.

=== Parish ===
The ancient parish of Hitchin covered an extensive rural area as well as the town itself, including Langley, Preston and St Ippolyts; the latter became a separate parish in the middle ages. The parish of Hitchin was administered by its vestry, in the same way as most rural areas; no borough corporation was established for the town, despite some limited moves in that direction in the thirteenth century. Hitchin also gave its name to one of the hundreds of Hertfordshire. The Hitchin Poor Law Union was established in 1835, covering the parish of Hitchin and many of the surrounding parishes in north-western Hertfordshire, plus the parish of Holwell which was in Bedfordshire. In 1891 the parish had a population of 9,510.

Hitchin
- Local Board of Health District (1850–1858); Local Government District (1873–1894); Urban District (1894–1974)
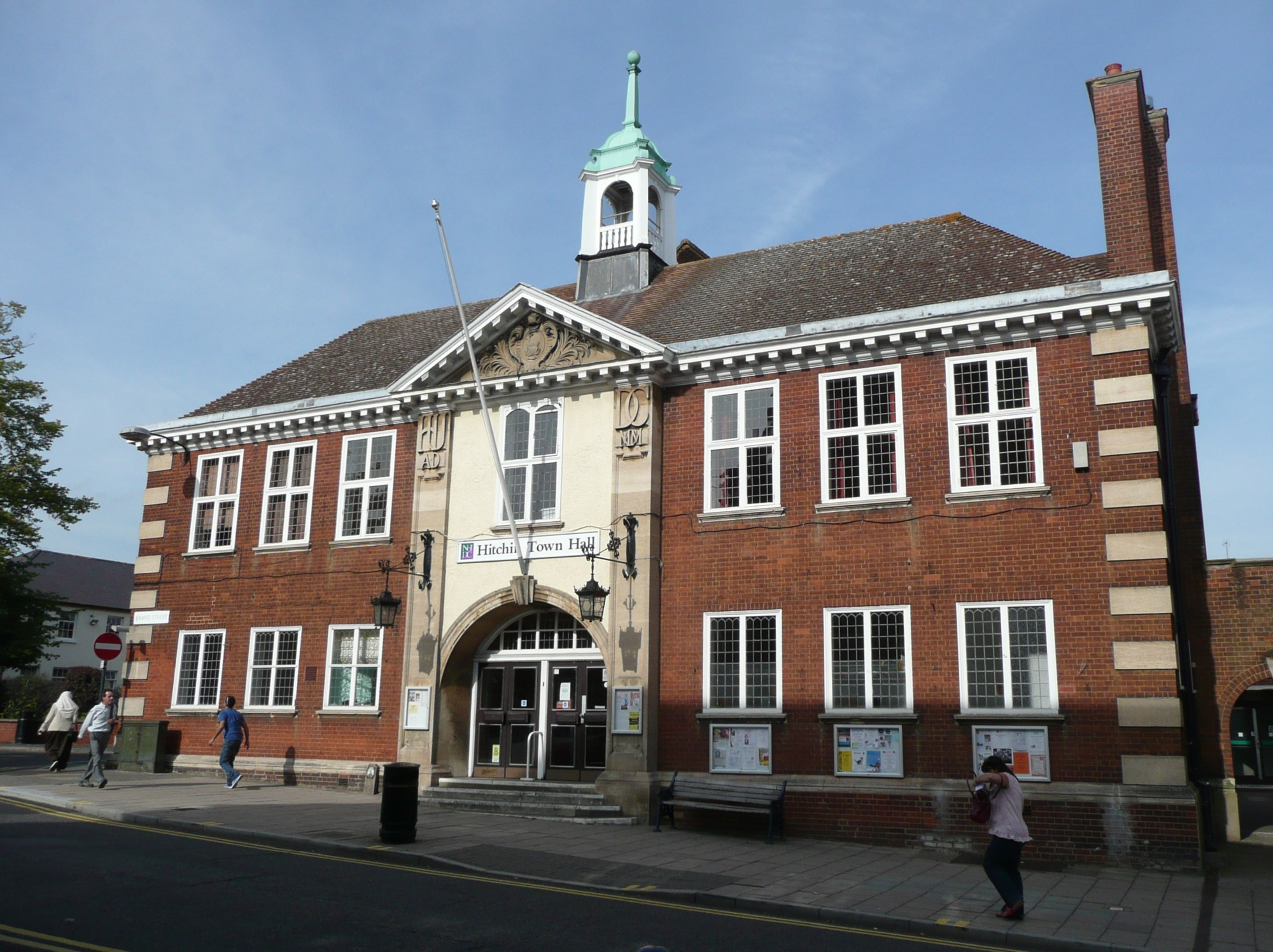
- Town Hall, Brand Street, Hitchin

Coat of arms
- Population
  - 1901: 10,072
  - 1971: 27,625
- History
  - Created: 1850 (first creation); 1873 (second creation)
  - Abolished: 31 March 1974
  - Succeeded by: North Hertfordshire
  - HQ: Hitchin
- Contained within
  - County Council: Hertfordshire

=== Local Board ===
In 1850 a local board of health was established for the town. Such boards were created under the Public Health Act 1848, and were focussed on improving public health in towns. The first election to the Hitchin Local Board was held on 2 May 1850. The board proceeded to build a waterworks and install new sewers for the town, which had previously used the River Hiz as a public sewer. However, the board quickly became embroiled in legal disputes with Joshua Ransom, owner of Grove Mill, who complained about the flow of water and sewage at his mill. No solution could be found which would allow the board to continue to operate, and gradually all the board members resigned.

By December 1857 the board only had three members, at which point it effectively ceased to function. New members were elected in March 1858, but none was prepared to take the declaration of office unless Ransom accepted an offer of settlement which had been put to him. He did not accept the offer and so the board became defunct, and the town was once again governed by the parish vestry alone. The Times was scathing of the Hitchin Local Board's inability to negotiate a solution, saying "...they simply resigned, like rustics of unfertile brains...". Legal action continued for some years afterwards trying to resolve who was liable for the old board's debts.

In August 1872 sanitary districts were established, with public health and local government responsibilities being given to boards of guardians of the poor law unions for all areas which did not have urban authorities (including local boards). As Hitchin's previous local board was defunct, the town therefore became part of the Hitchin Rural Sanitary District, governed by the Hitchin Board of Guardians. On 31 October 1872 a meeting was held in the town with the aim of securing a new board to allow the town to govern itself independently. A new board was eventually granted, with the first meeting being held on 24 December 1873 at the (old) Town Hall.

=== Hitchin Urban District ===
Under the Local Government Act 1894, urban sanitary districts became urban districts on 31 December 1894. Hitchin Local Board therefore became Hitchin Urban District Council. The act also stipulated that a parish could not be partly in an urban district and partly outside it. The old parish of Hitchin was therefore split, with the parts outside the urban district becoming the three separate civil parishes of Langley, Preston, and Walsworth with effect from their first parish meetings on 4 December 1894. The three new rural parishes were all included in the Hitchin Rural District.

The Urban District Council took over the existing Town Hall on Brand Street, which had been built in 1840. In 1900 the council built a new Town Hall on the opposite side of the street, incorporating a large public hall. The older building became known as Old Town Hall, but continued to serve as office space for the council in addition to the new Town Hall.

On 1 April 1921, Walsworth parish was abolished and the area was incorporated into Hitchin Urban District.

Hitchin Urban District Council was granted a coat of arms on 25 November 1936.

Hitchin Urban District was abolished under the Local Government Act 1972, becoming part of the district of North Hertfordshire on 1 April 1974. No successor parish was created for the town, and so it became an unparished area.

== Transport ==
=== Rail ===
Hitchin railway station is on the East Coast Main Line Great Northern Line, and is also on the Cambridge Line as the last stop before it diverges towards Cambridge, 1.42 kilometres (0.88 mi) to the northeast of Hitchin. The station is a call on services provided by Govia Thameslink Railway under its Great Northern and Thameslink brands. These provide direct connections to Cambridge, Letchworth Garden City, Peterborough and London King's Cross; as well as St Pancras International, Gatwick Airport, Three Bridges and Brighton. Journeys to London and Cambridge typically take 33 minutes. Journeys to Stevenage take 5 minutes, Peterborough 45 minutes, and Gatwick Airport 78 minutes.

Hitchin Rail Users Group serves as the local voluntary group actively consulting with train companies on behalf of local people.

=== Road ===
The A505, A600 and A602 roads intersect in Hitchin, which is about three miles (5 km) from the A1(M) motorway and about ten miles (16 km) from the M1 motorway.

=== Aviation ===
Hitchin is about 14.48 km (9.00 mi) from Luton Airport, with a direct bus service linking the two. The connections are provided by National Express (number 787) & Arriva in Herts & Essex (100 Sapphire services).

=== Buses ===
Hitchin is well served by local buses including Arriva, Centrebus, Grant Palmer, Stagecoach and Uno.

== Education ==
There are several primary schools in Hitchin. Secondary education is provided at Hitchin Girls' School, Hitchin Boys' School, the Priory School and Kingshott School, Hitchin. There is a campus of the North Hertfordshire College in Hitchin, and it is also the home of the Benslow Music Trust which provides music education for adults, while North Herts Music School adjoined to Hitchin Girls' School delivers music lessons & activities for children & young people.

The Emil Dale Academy was formerly located on Wilbury Way in Hitchin before moving to Letchworth. EDA is a drama school where students train and study for a BA (hons) degree in Musical Theatre in partnership with the University of Bedfordshire. The school also has a sixth form and a weekend school.

North Hertfordshire Museum has an extensive collection that tells the story of the town and wider area from prehistoric times. The British Schools Museum is housed in original Edwardian and Victorian school buildings.

== Culture and community ==
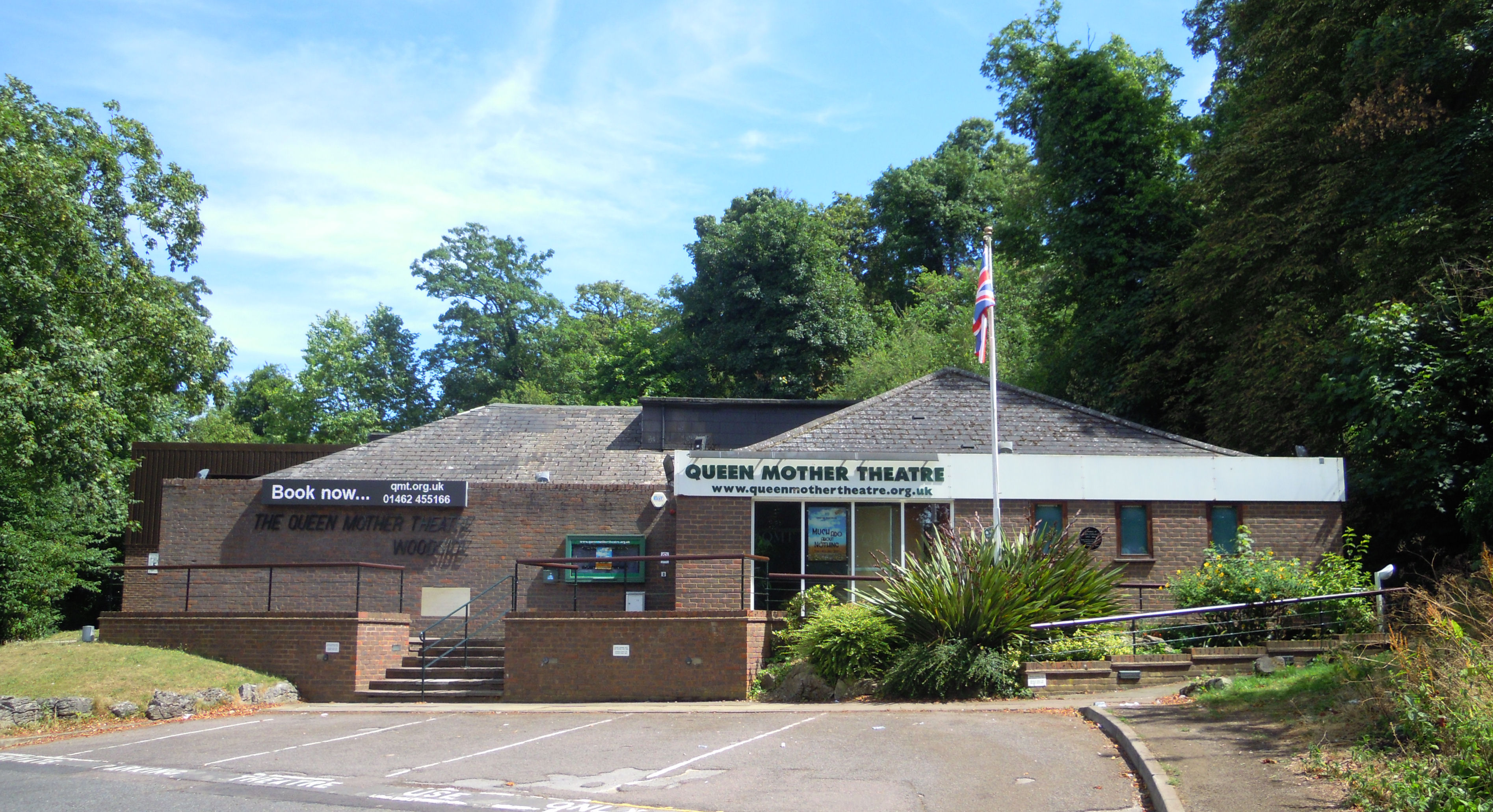
The Queen Mother Theatre in the town

In March 2013 a poll in The Times voted Hitchin the 9th best town in the UK in which to live.

Hitchin hosts an annual Arts and Music Festival with over 100 events taking place during the month. Hitchin Festival includes picnics, concerts, theatre, ghost walks, art exhibitions, comedy club, talks, summer fetes and fireworks. Since 2014, Hitchin has hosted a yarn festival.

Music plays a very big part all year round with many venues hosting regular gigs. Hitchin Folk Club meets at The Cricket Pavilion, Lucas Lane on Sunday evenings; Hitchin Light Orchestra, Hitchin Symphony Orchestra and Hitchin Chamber Orchestra give regular concerts, often in St Mary's Church, and the Hitchin Band performs around the country in brass band championship competitions as well as the home town.

An independent music venue, Club 85, hosts an "eclectic mix of contemporary bands and DJs" in the area.

There are three theatres in the town. The Factory Playhouse is located on Wilbury Way and is the theatre of Emil Dale Academy. They host several full-scale musicals each year with professional producers, directors, choreographers and West End musicians. The Market Theatre, Hitchin is a professional theatre, has a year-round programme including comedy plays, thrillers, historical shows, jazz nights and cocktail evenings. The Market Theatre is known for its annual Adult Panto (running between December and May) which also tours nationally. Additionally, the Queen Mother Theatre hosts the town's Bancroft Players, Big Spirit Youth Theatre and occasional visiting companies as well as Hitchin Films in the Richard Whitmore Studio.

Hitchin Market remains one of the largest in the area with general markets every Tuesday and Saturday, a bric-a-brac and collectables market on Fridays, and a Sunday Car Boot. There are also Local Produce and Crafts specialist markets on the last Saturday of each month. A Lifestyle market is held on every second Saturday of the month, while infrequently there are occasional Art Markets. Hitchin Markets is also the venue for the annual Duck Race during Hitchin Festival.

The town centre has a wealth of independent retailers in food and drink and fashion and the historic core is a place to find niche boutiques. Since 1995, Hitchin has benefited from award-winning town centre management and in 2009 established one of Hertfordshire's first Business Improvement Districts.

In 2019 the town's centre was a finalist for England in the Visa/UK Government Great British High Street Awards.

There are a number of organisations for young people, including 1066 Hitchin Squadron ATC, Hitchin Army Cadets, Sea Cadets Letchworth and Hitchin, as well as various scouting groups.

The main burial ground for the town is Hitchin Cemetery on St. John's Road.

Hitchin is twinned with:

- Nuits-St-Georges, France
- Bingen am Rhein, Germany

== Sport in Hitchin ==
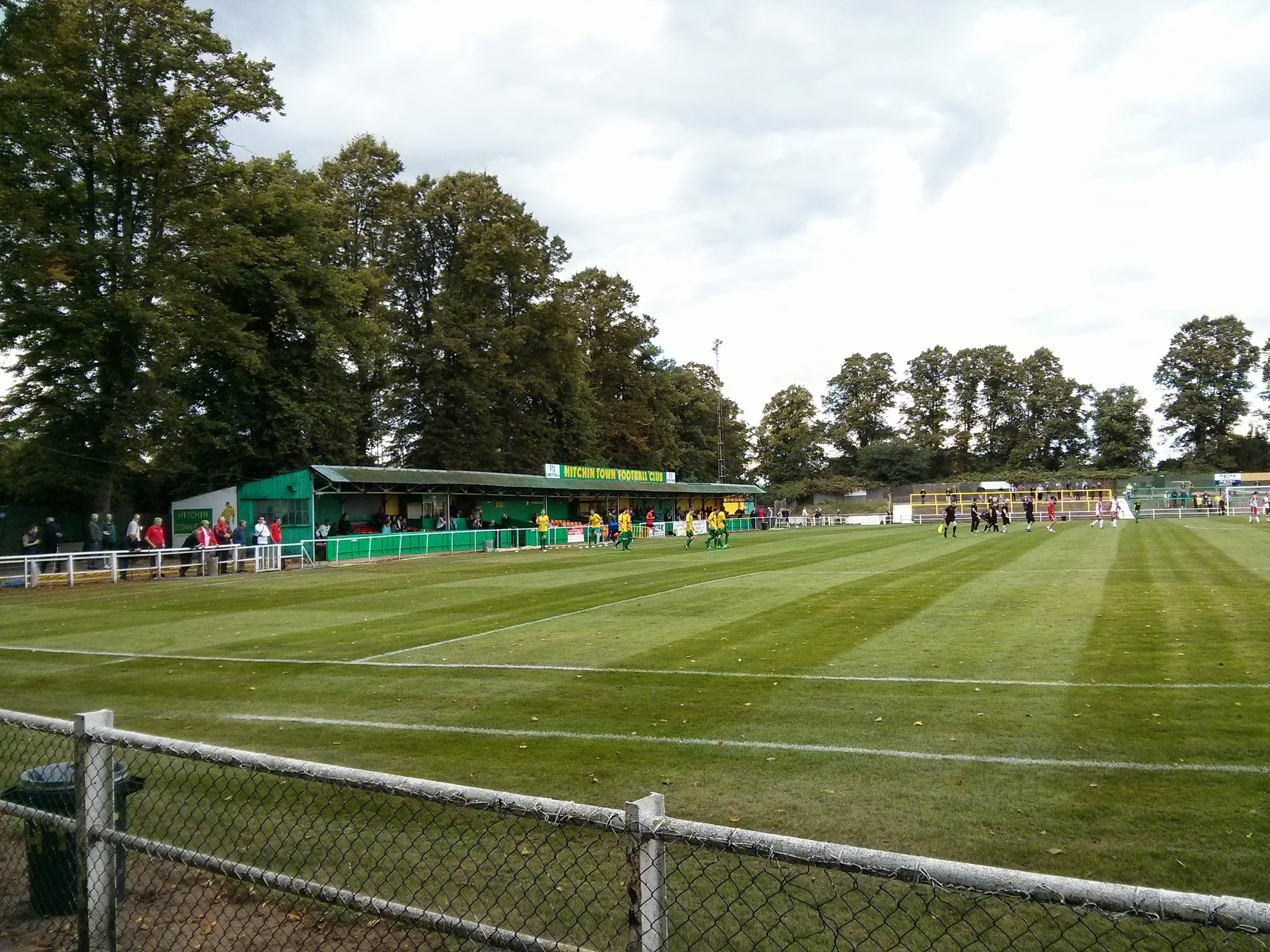
Top Field, the home ground of Hitchin Town F.C.

=== Rugby Union ===
Hitchin Rugby Club was founded in 1954 and competes in rugby union at all age levels within the Hitchin area. This includes teams at ages 7 to 12, 13 to 17, under 19s, seniors, over 35s, and a Ladies side.

The club's highlights have included playing at Twickenham in the final of the national Junior RFU Cup in 1993 and the establishment of the country's first Academy. Currently membership stands at over 500 people. The club are also active as a voluntary group with their community development programme.

=== Association Football ===
Hitchin Town F.C. was established in 1865 and later reformed in 1928. It is one of only three clubs who competed in the inaugural FA Cup, paying the then £25 entry fee (£2,892 in 2019 adjusted for inflation), and continue to compete. They claim to be the second oldest club in English football, but some dispute this due to the reformation in the 1920s.

The side currently compete in the Southern League Premier Division Central, the seventh tier of English football. The club play at 4,554-capacity ground Top Field, in the north of the town, and came close to achieving promotion in the late 2010s, but have recently come into a more troubled spell.

Their highlights include wins in the F.A. Cup against higher ranked sides Hereford United in 1994 and Bristol Rovers in 1995 during which period they developed a reputation for "giant-killing".

The side count Hitchin-born England international Jack Wilshere among their supporters. Wilshere studied at the Priory School in the town and now runs a youth scheme called the Jack Wilshere Soccer School.

The club were featured by Sky Sports during their coverage of Non-League Day 2019 (taking place on 12 October each year), with the broadcaster following the match day experience at the club.

=== Other sports ===
Hitchin is also home to Blueharts Hockey Club, a leading club since 1946, with 7 men's teams and 7 women's teams plus a thriving junior section. It also houses Hitchin Cricket Club, which has been an important cricket club in the area since 1866.

Hitchin Swimming Club is based locally and competes at local, county and regional level.

The Hitchin Nomads Cycling Club, which caters for many competitive and non-competitive cycling disciplines, was formed in the town in 1931. It is affiliated to British Cycling, the Cyclists' Touring Club, Cycling time trials and local cycling associations. Notable former members include pre-eminent cycling travel writer Harold Briercliffe and Max Pendleton, father of Olympic gold-medallist and track cycling World Champion Victoria Pendleton.

Formed in 2003 and known as FVS TRI until November 2009, Team Trisports is a Hitchin-based triathlon club. In addition to triathlon, the club is an England Athletics and British Cycling affiliate.

Hitchin Running Club was formed in 2008 and is one of the most popular clubs in the town. They enjoy a large fan base and many local people of all abilities take part in the social activities. They are based at the rugby club and are a not for profit organisation.

== Districts of Hitchin ==
- Bearton
- Benslow
- Poets Estate
- Purwell
- Sunnyside
- Walsworth
- West Hitchin
- Westmill

== Nearby settlements ==
Ickleford is a village situated on the northern outskirts of Hitchin, and to the south are St Ippolyts, Charlton and Gosmore. The nearest towns are Letchworth, Baldock, Stevenage and Luton.

== Notable people ==
- Ken Leslie, "The Bishop Who Walked"
- Tim Downie, Actor
- Alison Balsom, Musician
- Dorothy Atkinson, actress
- Guillem Balagué, Spanish football journalist
- James Bay, musician
- Tom Bentley, philanthropist
- Robert Bentley, botanist
- Henry Bessemer, engineer
- The Bleach Boys, Punk Band dating from 1976
- Jennie Bond, journalist
- Sally Bretton, actress
- Harold Briercliffe, cyclist and author
- Drewe Broughton, footballer
- Edward Chapman, publisher
- George Chapman, poet
- Oliver Cheshire, fashion model
- Chris Cleaver, footballer
- Bill Coleman, cricketer
- L. S. Cousins, Buddhist scholar
- Mary Angela Dickens, novelist and granddaughter of Charles Dickens
- Monica Dickens, novelist and great granddaughter of Charles Dickens
- Karl Duguid, footballer
- Willie Duncan, musician, of Spider Murphy Gang
- Gail Emms, badminton player
- Iain Farrington, pianist, composer, arranger
- Ross Flitney, footballer
- Mathew Gates, figure skater
- Martin Gordon, musician
- F.L. Griggs, etcher
- Molly-Mae Hague, social media influencer
- Henry Hawkins, 1st Baron Brampton, judge
- E O Higgins, author
- Reginald Hine, solicitor and historian
- Paul Jesson, actor
- Roy Kettle, author
- Thea King, clarinettist
- Dave Kitson, footballer
- Kane Kramer, inventor of the digital audio player
- Frank Launder, film director
- Chi Lewis-Parry, actor, stunt performer, mixed martial artist and kickboxer
- Joseph Lister, pioneer of antiseptic surgery
- John Lloyd, co-founder of the international design consultancy Lloyd Northover.
- Samuel Lucas, brewer and artist
- Ed Macfarlane, lead singer of the English electronic music band Friendly Fires
- Anne Macnaghten (1908–2000), classical violinist and teacher, lived at 23 Wymondley Road from the late 1960s
- Gavin McInnes, writer, political commentator, founder of the Proud Boys
- Sally Biddulph, journalist and presenter
- Elaine Murray, Scottish politician
- Robert Newman, comedian
- David Noble, footballer
- Arvind Parmar, tennis player
- Caroline Pellew (1882--1963), geneticist, died in Hitchin
- Ian Perkins, Musician
- Kevin Phillips, footballer
- Kevin Pilkington, footballer
- Ian Poulter, golfer
- Pam Rhodes, BBC TV presenter
- Helen Richardson-Walsh, England and Great Britain hockey player
- Michael Robbins, actor
- Andrew Rumsey, Anglican bishop
- Claire Rushbrook, actress
- Robert Tor Russell, architect of New Delhi
- Martin Savage, actor
- Steve Sheppard, B.B.C. Cricket and football commentator and owner of One World Music
- Valerie Singleton, TV presenter
- Richard Walker, angler
- Diana Wallis, politician (MEP)
- Kristiina Wheeler, an English-Finnish singer
- Richard Whitmore, former newsreader
- Sir Frank Whittle, inventor of the jet engine
- Jack Wilshere, footballer
- Henry Wood, conductor
- Second Lieutenant Frank Young, recipient of the Victoria Cross.

== Filmography ==
- Mike Leigh's 1982 film Home Sweet Home for BBC Television was set in Hitchin.
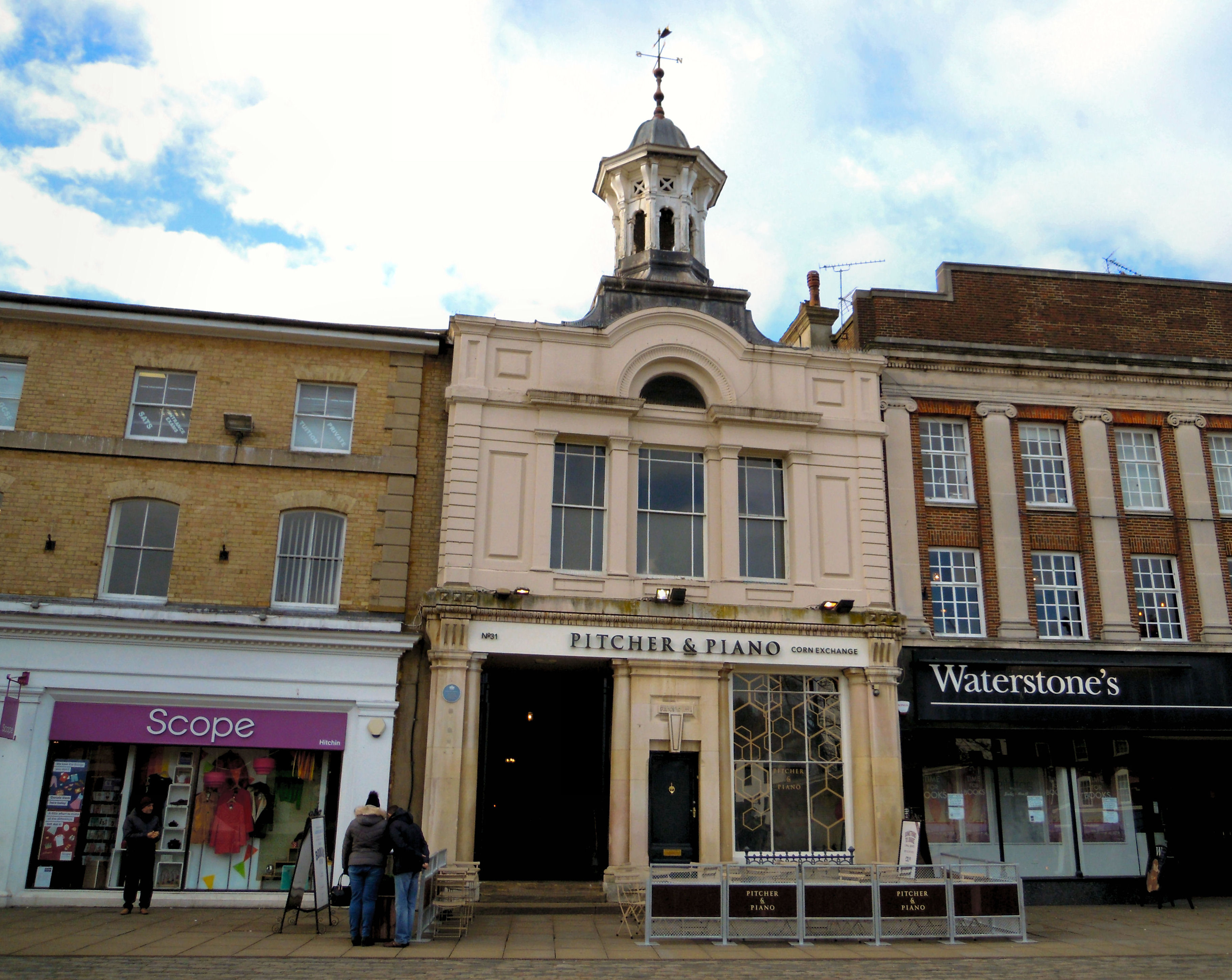
  Various scenes in Doctor Foster were filmed at the Market Square in Hitchin
- Part of the 2010 BBC TV series Just William was filmed at the British Schools Museum.
- Scenes from the BBC drama series Doctor Foster were filmed in Hitchin.
- The Channel 4 science fiction TV series Humans was also filmed in the town.
- BBC One "Lens" idents have been filmed at Windmill Hill in Hitchin.
- Scenes from 2022 film My Policeman were filmed at Hitchin Swimming Centre.
- In September 2023, scenes from series 2 of the ITV drama Tell Me Everything were filmed in Hitchin; locations included Windmill Hill and outside St Mary's Church.

== Media ==
Local news and television programmes are provided by BBC East and ITV Anglia. Television signals are received from the Sandy Heath TV transmitter. The town's local radio stations are BBC Three Counties Radio on 95.5 FM and Heart Hertfordshire (originally BOB FM) on 106.9 FM. The local newspapers are The Comet and Hertfordshire Mercury.
