= Hitchin Rural District =

History of Hertfordshire

Coordinates: 51.950°N 0.280°W

- Rural district
- Population
  - 1901: 12,828
  - 1971: 24,760
- History
  - Created: 28 December 1894
  - Abolished: 31 March 1974
  - Succeeded by: North Hertfordshire
  - HQ: Hitchin
- Contained within
  - County Council: Hertfordshire

Hitchin Rural District was a rural district in Hertfordshire, England from 1894 to 1974, covering an area in the north of the county.

== Evolution ==
The district had its origins in the Hitchin Rural Sanitary District. This had been created under the Public Health Acts of 1872 and 1875, giving public health and local government responsibilities for rural areas to the existing boards of guardians of poor law unions. The Hitchin Rural Sanitary District covered the area of the Hitchin Poor Law Union excluding the towns of Hitchin, Baldock, and Stevenage.

Under the Local Government Act 1894, rural sanitary districts became rural districts from 28 December 1894. The link with the poor law union continued, with all the elected councillors of the rural district council being ex officio members of the Hitchin Board of Guardians. The first meeting of the new council was held on 8 January 1895, immediately after a meeting of the board of guardians. The first chairman of the council was Joseph Neville Hine (who was known by his middle name), a Conservative. He would hold the role of chairman for over 23 years.

The Local Government Act 1894 also directed that the new rural districts should be only in one county. Where rural sanitary districts straddled county boundaries, as Hitchin Rural Sanitary District did, they should be split into separate rural districts in each county, or otherwise boundary amendments should be made. Most of Hitchin Rural Sanitary District was in Hertfordshire, but the single parish of Holwell was in Bedfordshire. The Local Government Board agreed to allow the new Hitchin Rural District to initially straddle Hertfordshire and Bedfordshire. This anomaly was resolved when Holwell was transferred to Hertfordshire on 30 September 1897, and thereafter Hitchin Rural District was entirely in Hertfordshire.

In 1903 work began on the new town of Letchworth Garden City. It straddled the three parishes of Letchworth, Norton, and Willian, all of which were in Hitchin Rural District. Much of the early development of the garden city was therefore carried out under the byelaws and supervision of Hitchin Rural District Council. Letchworth parish was enlarged in 1908, when Norton parish was abolished and the northern part of Willian parish was transferred to Letchworth parish. The enlarged Letchworth parish remained part of Hitchin Rural District at that time. Letchworth was eventually removed from Hitchin Rural District in 1919, when it became Letchworth Urban District.

In 1921 Hitchin Rural District ceded the parish of Walsworth to Hitchin Urban District.

Hitchin Rural District was substantially enlarged in 1935 when the neighbouring rural districts of Ashwell and Buntingford were abolished. A small area from Ashwell Rural District was given to Royston Urban District but the remainder became part of Hitchin Rural District, as did the three parishes of Sandon, Rushden, and Wallington from Buntingford Rural District. The parish of Willian was ceded to Letchworth Urban District at the same time.

In 1953 the parish of Shephall was ceded to Stevenage Urban District, along with parts of the parishes of Graveley, Knebworth and Wymondley, reflecting the ongoing growth of Stevenage, which had been designated as a new town in 1946.

== Parishes ==
Hitchin Rural District contained the following civil parishes.

Parish	From	To	Notes
Ashwell	1935	1974	From Ashwell Rural District.
Barkway	1935	1974	From Ashwell Rural District.
Barley	1935	1974	From Ashwell Rural District.
Bygrave	1894	1974	
Caldecote	1894	1974	
Clothall	1894	1974	
Codicote	1894	1974	
Graveley	1894	1974	
Great Wymondley	1894	1937	Merged with Little Wymondley to become Wymondley parish.
Hexton	1894	1974	
Hinxworth	1935	1974	From Ashwell Rural District.
Holwell	1894	1974	In Bedfordshire until 1897.
Ickleford	1894	1974	
Kelshall	1935	1974	From Ashwell Rural District.
Kimpton	1894	1974	
King's Walden	1894	1974	
Knebworth	1894	1974	
Langley	1894	1974	
Letchworth	1894	1919	Became Letchworth Urban District.
Lilley	1894	1974	
Little Wymondley	1894	1937	Merged with Great Wymondley to become Wymondley parish.
Newnham	1894	1974	
Norton	1894	1908	Parish abolished to become part of Letchworth.
Nuthampstead	1935	1974	From Ashwell Rural District.
Offley	1894	1974	
Pirton	1894	1974	
Preston	1894	1974	
Radwell	1894	1974	
Reed	1935	1974	From Ashwell Rural District.
Rushden	1935	1974	From Buntingford Rural District.
St Ippolyts	1894	1974	
St Paul's Walden	1894	1974	
Sandon	1935	1974	From Buntingford Rural District.
Shephall	1894	1953	Parish abolished to become part of Stevenage Urban District.
Therfield	1935	1974	From Ashwell Rural District.
Wallington	1935	1974	From Buntingford Rural District.
Walsworth	1894	1921	Parish abolished to become part of Hitchin Urban District.
Weston	1894	1974	
Willian	1894	1935	Northern part of parish given to Letchworth parish 1908. Parish abolished 1935 to become part of Letchworth Urban District.
Wymondley	1937	1974	Created from merger of Great Wymondley and Little Wymondley parishes.

== Premises ==
Hitchin Rural District Council did not have purpose-built offices of its own. Meetings were held at the board room at Hitchin Workhouse or at Hitchin Town Hall in the early years, with administrative office functions being carried out at 5 Bancroft and 9 Bancroft in Hitchin, which were the offices of the solicitor who acted as clerk to the council.

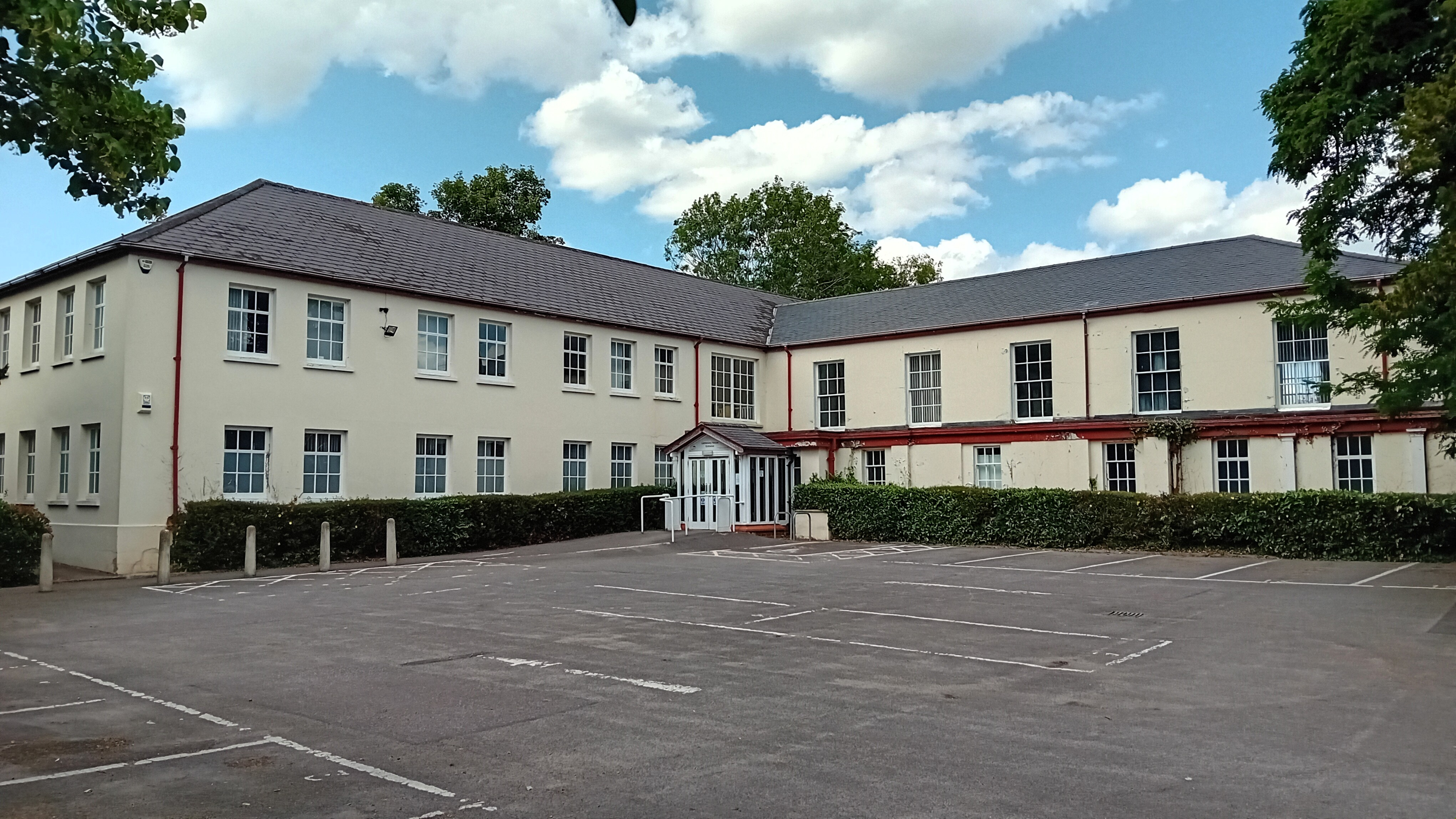
Council Offices (Centenary House), Grammar School Walk, Hitchin

From the 1930s to the early 1960s the council was based at 21 Bancroft in Hitchin. Around 1961 the council took over the former Society of Friends' Meeting House at the junction of Grammar School Walk and Bedford Road in Hitchin, which the Society had recently vacated following the construction of their new meeting house on the opposite side of Bedford Road. The old meeting house became known as the Rural District Council Offices, and was substantially extended.

== Abolition ==
Hitchin Rural District was abolished under the Local Government Act 1972, merging with the urban districts of Hitchin, Letchworth, Baldock, and Royston on 1 April 1974 to form the new district of North Hertfordshire. The Grammar School Walk building continued to be used as council offices, initially by North Hertfordshire District Council, then by Hertfordshire County Council. The building was later renamed Centenary House.
