= Walsworth =

Area of Hitchin, Hertfordshire, England

Coordinates: 51.95647°N 0.25656°W

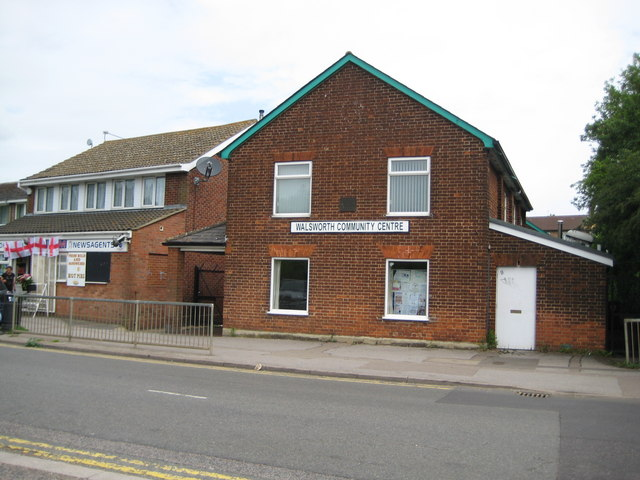
- Walsworth Community Centre

- Location within Hertfordshire
- Population: 7,877 (2011 Census. Hitchin Walsworth Ward)
- OS grid reference: TL199301
- District: North Hertfordshire
- Shire county: Hertfordshire
- Region: East
- Country: England
- Sovereign state: United Kingdom
- Post town: Hitchin
- Postcode district: SG4

Walsworth is a part of the town of Hitchin in Hertfordshire, England. It was originally a village about a mile north east of the town, and later became incorporated into it, although it is still referred to as a village by some locals. Hitchin Walsworth is one of five wards for the purposes of electing councillors to North Hertfordshire District Council. The ward includes the Purwell neighbourhood, south of Walsworth, which is named after the River Purwell.

Walsworth comes under the control of North Hertfordshire District Council with three elected Labour councillors, Kay Tart, Mike Hughson and Elizabeth Dennis.

== Amenities ==
Walsworth has a primary school, Highover Primary School, and a community centre. Another primary school, Purwell JMI is within the ward, in the Purwell neighbourhood.

Walsworth has two pubs: The Millstream (formerly known as the Ship) on Cambridge Road next to the River Purwell, and the Anchor also on Cambridge Road, about 100 m to the East of the Millstream. Both pubs have been renovated in recent years. A third pub, The Sailor (formerly the Sailor Boy) on Woolgrove Road, opposite a playing field (Walsworth Common) was closed in 2013. On 29 May 2015, it caught fire, shortly after which the local council approved plans to change the site into flats and a convenience store.

St Faith's Church lies at the centre of the ward at the crossroads on the A505 with Willian Road and Woolgrove Road, built in the 1890s by the Rev'd Gainsford as a Mission Church.

== Governance ==
Walsworth was part of the ancient parish of Hitchin. It became a separate civil parish under the Local Government Act 1894, which stipulated that parishes could not straddle urban and rural districts. The parts of Hitchin parish outside the Hitchin Urban District therefore became the parishes of Langley, Preston, and Walsworth, with effect from the first parish meetings on 4 December 1894. The three rural parishes were included in the Hitchin Rural District. Walsworth ceased to be a separate civil parish in 1921, with the area being absorbed into Hitchin Urban District on 1 April 1921. In 1911 the parish had a population of 592. Walsworth has since then been administered as part of the town of Hitchin, although gives its name to one of the town's five electoral wards on North Hertfordshire District Council.

== Culture ==
The Walsworth community festival takes place each May on Walsworth Common. Run by volunteers, it is held on a Sunday in the middle of the month. The Festival has been running since 1974, and has charity stalls, funfair rides and refreshments as well as live entertainment in the form of arena events and a music tent.

== Nature ==
There is a nature reserve and recreational area at Purwell Meadows. The areas alongside the River Purwell were once notorious for regular flooding although in recent years, drainage improvements associated with house building appear to have alleviated the problem. However, heavy rain has caused flooding at the Walsworth cross roads as recently as September 2011, causing the road to be closed by the college. Flooding to a depth of approximately 8 cm affects the entrance of Chaucer Way with the meadows adjoining Chaucer Way and Purwell Lane regularly becoming flooded to a depth of 20 cm (7.9 in). Since the construction of housing along the flood plain, the river can completely dry up during periods of drought.
