= Poets Estate (Hitchin) =

Settlement in the United Kingdom

Coordinates: 51°57′00″N 0°15′20″W

The Poets Estate is a residential area of Hitchin, Hertfordshire, England. It lies to the east of the town centre, based around St Michael's Road and the surrounding roads, which are named after famous British poets. There is a primary school (Mary Exton JMI) and a community centre called St Michael's Mount.
