= Benslow Music Trust =

Coordinates: 51.9498°N 0.2647°W

Benslow Music Trust is a charitable trust established to promote music education. The trust is based in the Benslow area of Hitchin in Hertfordshire, England, and primarily operates as an adult education college.

Under its trading name of Benslow Music, Benslow Music Trust operates a wide range of courses for instrumentalists and singers at all competency levels and also offers courses in music appreciation. Most are two- or three-day residential courses, but there are also day courses and longer summer schools. Courses in classical, early, jazz and folk music take place all through the year both at weekends and in midweek.

The trust also promotes its own International Concert Series, with concerts held at the trust headquarters throughout the year. The President until his death in March 2016 was Sir Peter Maxwell Davies. The current President is Judith Weir. Vice-Presidents include Steven Isserlis, Melvyn Tan and John Rutter.

The trust is the parent charity for the Benslow Music Instrument Loan Scheme which lends musical instruments to school and college students throughout the United Kingdom.
