= Benslow =

Coordinates: 51°57′00″N 0°15′50″W

Benslow is a district of Hitchin, Hertfordshire, England. It is located very close to the railway station. Houses in the area range from those built in the late 19th century to a more modern housing estate at the top of Benslow Lane built in the 1990s. The original properties were built as a response to the arrival of the railway in Hitchin and the housing needs this created, and consist mainly of terraced housing, with some larger properties.

Situated in the area is Pinehill private hospital, St Andrew's CofE primary school, and a nursing home Benslow House which was originally the first Higher Education College for women, founded by Emily Davies, which later moved to Girton College, Cambridge.

Linking Benslow Lane with Chiltern Road is a large green open space, often referred to as Benslow or Pinehill field, which is detached playing field for Hitchin Girls' School.

Also in the district of Benslow is the Benslow Music Trust, an independent charity which hosts residential and day courses for adult amateur musicians of all standards. It occupies the 1859 house originally known as 'Fairfield' and later as 'Little Benslow Hills', which was built by Quaker William Ransom and bequeathed to the Rural Music Schools Association by Esther Seebohm on her death in 1951. It was the first of the Rural Music Schools, and their Association was founded in Hitchin in 1929 by (Ellen) Mary Ibberson (1892–1979), who held the role of Director until 1947.
