= Corn Exchange, Hitchin =

Commercial building in Hitchin, Hertfordshire, England

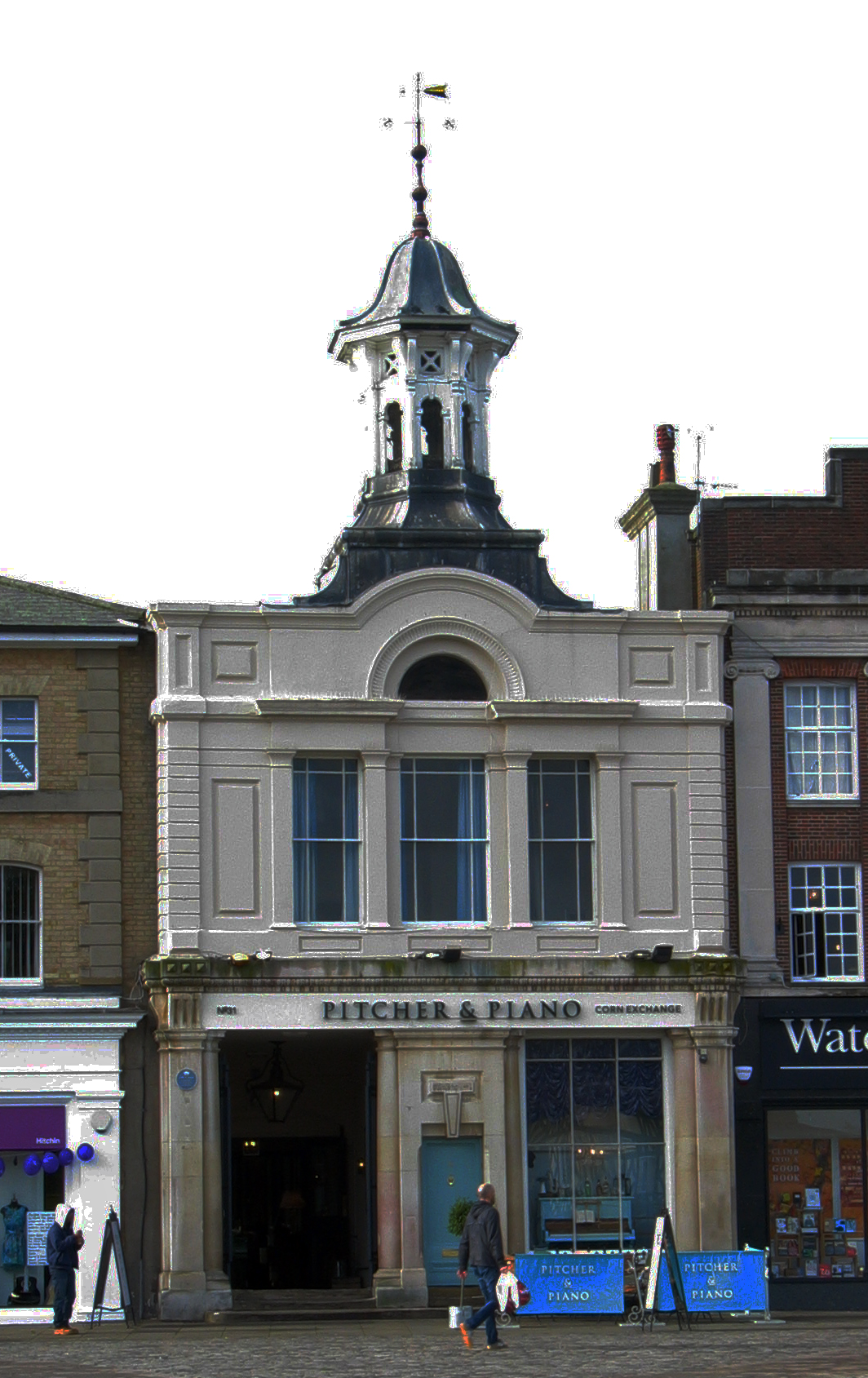
- Corn Exchange, Hitchin

- Shown in Hertfordshire
- 51.9475°N 0.2792°W
- Location: Market Place, Hitchin

History
- Built: 1853

Site notes
- Architect: William Beck
- Architectural style: Neoclassical style

Listed Building – Grade II
- Official name: Former Corn Exchange
- Designated: 14 October 1988
- Reference no.: 1102132

The Corn Exchange is a commercial building in the Market Place in Hitchin, Hertfordshire, England. The structure, which is currently used as a bar and restaurant, is a Grade II listed building.

== History ==
Until the mid-19th century, corn merchants in the town traded in the open at stalls in the High Street. However, in September 1850, a group of local businessmen decided to form a private company, to be known as the "Hitchin Market Company", to finance and commission a purpose-built corn exchange for the town. The site they selected was occupied by the Red Lion Inn, which was captured in a painting by the local artist, Samuel Lucas, shortly before it was demolished.

The new building was designed by a London-based architect, William Beck, in the neoclassical style, built by George Jeeves in red brick with a stucco finish at a cost of £2,600 and was officially opened on 22 March 1853. The design involved a symmetrical main frontage of three bays facing onto the Market Place. The central bay featured a doorway with an architrave and prominent keystone flanked by wide Tuscan order pilasters supporting an entablature. It was fenestrated by large windows with glazing bars on the ground floor and by a central Venetian window on the first floor. At roof level, there was a cornice, a timber cupola and a weather vane. Internally, the principal room was the main hall which was 82 feet (25 m) long and 51 feet (16 m) wide and featured a roof supported by cast iron columns.

The use of the building as a corn exchange declined significantly in the wake of the Great Depression of British Agriculture in the late 19th century. The Hitchin Market Company's financial difficulties were compounded by the fact that it had secured a lease on the market tolls from the Crown which expired in 1882: it tried to secure an extension but was out-bid by the local board. Instead, the building was used as a public events venue: the local suffragette, Elizabeth Impey, gave a speech in the building in 1907. After having been found guilty of disorderly conduct while campaigning in London, she was sentenced to 14 days in HM Prison Holloway in March 1906. This led to her being treated as a social outcast in Hitchin and, after delivering her speech in the corn exchange, she was smuggled out of a side door to prevent her being attacked by the crowds.

During the Second World War the corn exchange served as a British Restaurant providing meals for needy people. After the war it accommodated a skating rink and, in the 1980s and 1990s, it served as a crafts and antiques centre. It then became a night club known as "Que Pasa" (Spanish for "What's up") in 2009, and became a bar and restaurant known as the "Pitcher and Piano" in 2013. In August 2024, the bar changed its name to The Glasshouse after a management change, although Marston's plc retained ownership.

== See also ==
- Corn exchanges in England
