= Langley, Hertfordshire =

Hamlet in Hertfordshire, England

Coordinates: 51.88799°N 0.23398°W

Langley
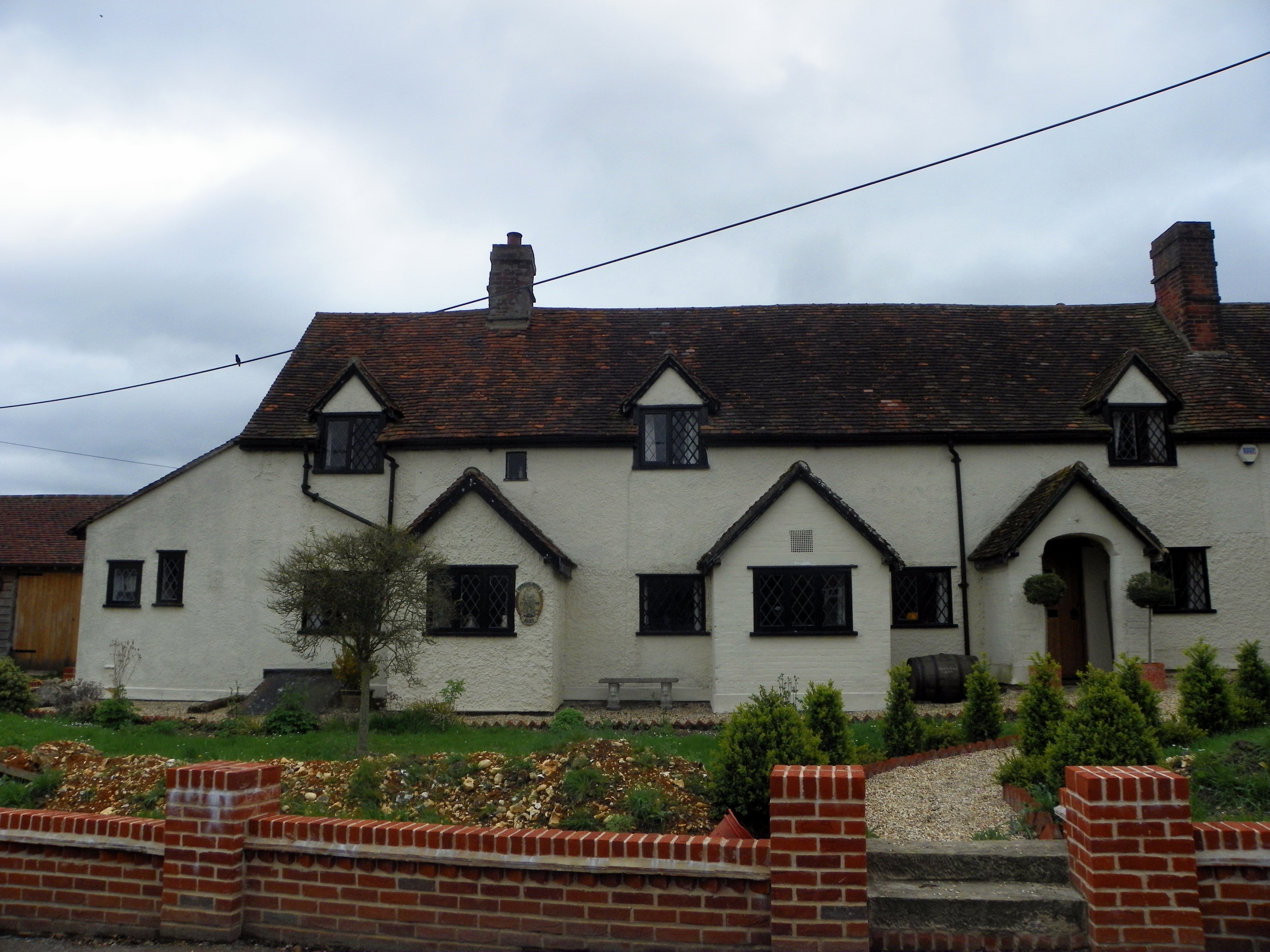
- Former Farmer's Boy Public House, Langley

- Location within Hertfordshire
- Population: 201 (Parish, 2021)
- OS grid reference: TL217224
- Civil parish: Langley
- District: North Hertfordshire
- Shire county: Hertfordshire
- Region: East
- Country: England
- Sovereign state: United Kingdom
- Post town: Hitchin
- Postcode district: SG4
- Dialling code: 01438
- Police: Hertfordshire
- Fire: Hertfordshire
- Ambulance: East of England
- UK Parliament: Hitchin and Harpenden

Langley is a hamlet and civil parish in the North Hertfordshire district of Hertfordshire, England. It is located four miles south of Hitchin, on the B656 road west of Stevenage. The ruined Minsden Chapel lies within the parish.

== History ==
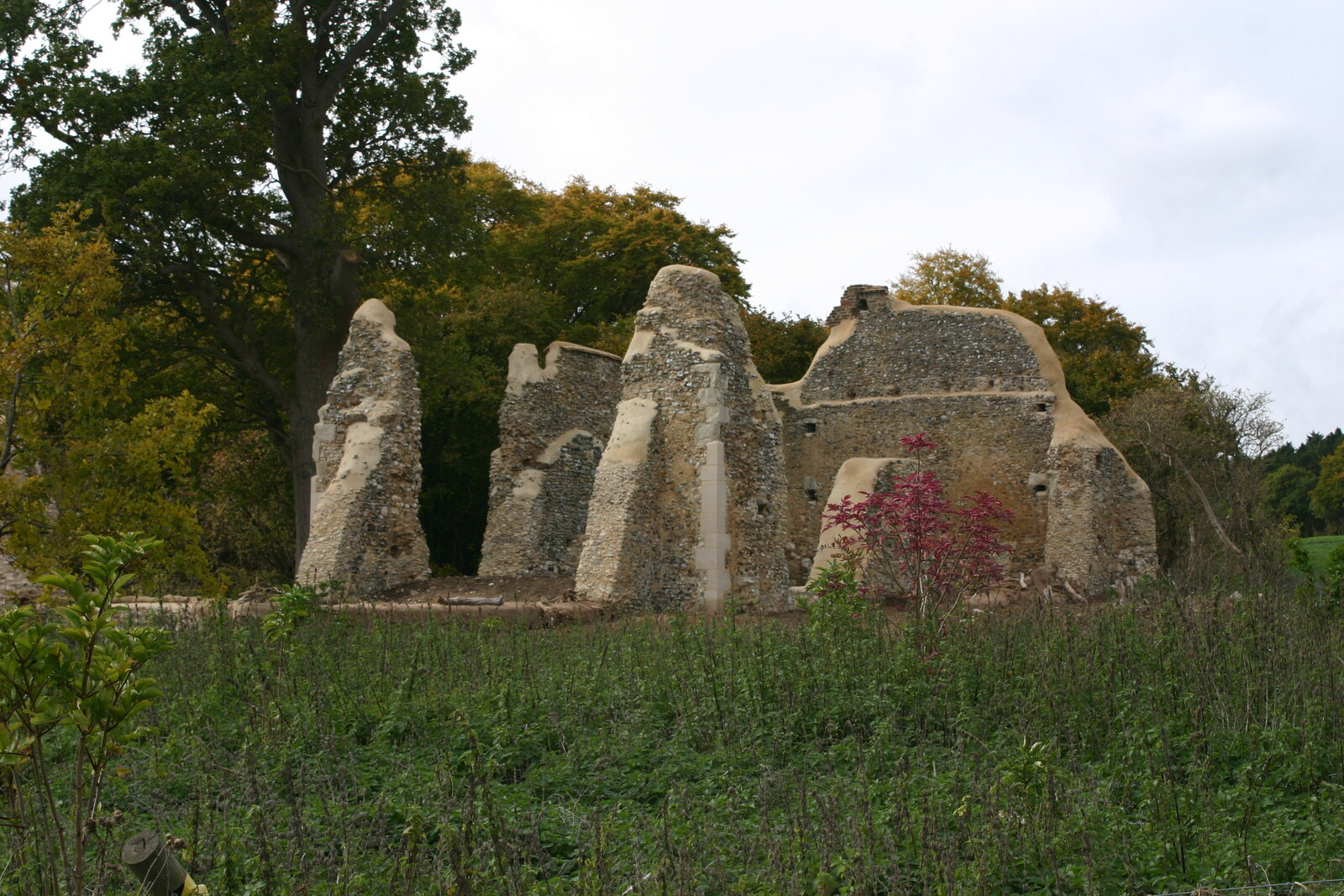
Minsden Chapel

Langley and neighbouring Preston historically formed part of the ancient parish of Hitchin, together forming a long salient to the south of the town itself. Minsden Chapel was built, probably in the 14th century, to serve as a chapel of ease for the rural southern part of Hitchin parish. It stands in an isolated location halfway between Langley and Preston, the two main settlements it was intended to serve. The chapel had been abandoned and fallen into ruin by the end of the 17th century.

From 1873, the town of Hitchin was constituted a local government district. Under the Local Government Act 1894, such districts were reconstituted as urban districts, and civil parishes were no longer allowed to straddle district boundaries. The parts of Hitchin parish outside the urban district were therefore made into three new parishes in December 1894: Langley, Preston, and Walsworth. Langley civil parish was then included in the Hitchin Rural District between 1894 and 1974, when it became part of North Hertfordshire.

== Governance ==
There are two elected tiers of local government covering Langley, at district and county level: North Hertfordshire District Council and Hertfordshire County Council. Due to its low population, Langley has a parish meeting comprising all residents instead of an elected parish council.

== Population ==
At the 2021 census, the population of the parish was 201. The population had been 175 in 2011.
