= Kane Kramer =

British inventor and businessman (born 1956)

- Born: 11 March 1956 (age 70); Hackney, London
- Citizenship: British
- Known for: Inventor
- Website: www.kanekramer.com

Kane Kramer is a British inventor and businessman. He is credited with the initial invention of the digital audio player, in 1979.

== Invention of the DAP ==
In 1981 Kramer filed for a UK patent for his newly conceived digital audio player, the IXI. UK patent 2115996 was issued in 1985, and U.S. patent 4,667,088 was issued in 1987. The player was the size of a credit card with a small LCD screen and navigation and volume buttons and would have held data of at least 8 MB of solid-state bubble memory chip with a capacity of 3½ minutes' worth of audio. Plans were made for a 10-minute stereo memory card and the system was at one time fitted with a hard drive enabling over an hour of recorded digital music. His first investor was Sir Paul McCartney. Later, Kramer set up a company to promote IXI and five working prototypes were produced with 16-bit sampling at 44.1 kilohertz with the pre-production prototype being unveiled at the APRS Audio/Visual trade exhibition in October 1986. In a 2004 interview with The Guardian, Kramer stated that the company at the time had "orders worth £60 million" (value at current day) for the device from the recording industry. However, in 1988 a boardroom dispute within Kramer's company and the subsequent failure to raise the £60,000 required to renew the patent resulted in the patent lapsing and entering the public domain, though Kramer is still the owner of the designs.

== iPod testimony ==
In 2008, Kramer was called as a witness by Apple Inc. to defend itself from charges of patent infringement for its iPod digital audio player.

== Current work ==
Kramer is still professionally involved in the technology sector. He is the Chairman of the British Inventor's Society and Organizer of the British Invention Show & World Invention Awards. He acts as a technology advisor to International Clean Energy Circle (ICI) and a number of multinational companies. Kramer gives talks on innovation around the World, notably to the Directors at Argonne National Laboratory architects of the Manhattan Project, and Kramer followed Al Gore on the subject of climate change at the Royal Courts of Justice. Kramer is director and executive producer of the film Disparity which completed filming in late 2018 followed with the production of a new TV series and film Humankind. Disparity: The Search for Real-Aid, a 100-minute documentary film and aid face-off, was Kramer's third production. The film was released in 23 October 2019. Other productions are 10CC Live in Concert at Wembley in 1982, his first, and The Sweet Live in Concert at the Marquee Club in London 1986, his second.
