= Non-League Day =

English football event

Non-League Day is a day set aside in English football where supporters of clubs playing at the highest levels of the game are encouraged to experience football at non-league level with which they may be unfamiliar.

The idea was suggested in 2010 by James Doe. It is a non-profit and volunteer-run initiative and is set to coincide with a break in fixtures within the football calendar when the Premier League and Championship sides do not have games. This is so that international fixtures can be played and top level players will be on international duty.

It has received widespread backing from the Premier League and from Football League clubs as well as MPs, media organisations, charities and from non-league clubs themselves. The Football Association also gives its backing to the campaign.

Clubs often look to this day for a boost in attendance figures and offer reduced admittance prices to fans of other clubs for games played on Non-League Day. Clubs can also offer incentives for fans to attend. In August 2014, Bungay Town handed-out mushrooms to supporters attending their match with Martham in the Anglian Combination League Division Two doubling their normal match-day attendance to 100.
