= Samuel Lucas (1805–1870) =

British painter

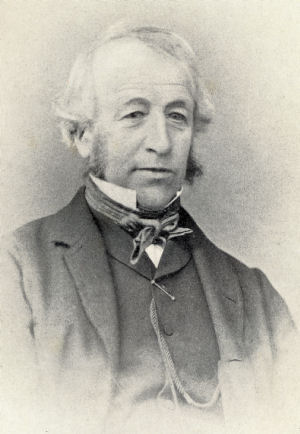
- Born: 1805; Hitchin, Hertfordshire, England
- Died: 1870 (aged 64–65); Hitchin, Hertfordshire, England
- Education: Society of Friends School in Bristol

Samuel Lucas (1805–1870) was a British brewer and amateur painter based in Hitchin.

His works range from extremely detailed representations to impressionistic views and he is likely to have been influenced by J. M. W. Turner.

== Biography ==
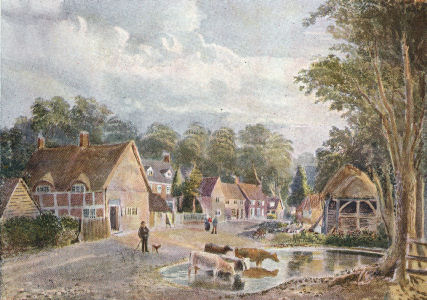
Gosmore by Samuel Lucas (1805–1870)

=== Early years ===
Samuel Lucas was born to William and Ann Lucas in Hitchin, Hertfordshire. He was the descendant of yeomen and brewers who were based in the area since the 1500s.

Samuel Lucas was educated at the Tilehouse Free School in Hitchin and at the Society of Friends School of Fishponds, Bristol. It was there that he discovered a passion for drawing. However, as his family were members of the Society of Friends and disapproved strongly of any artistic activity, Samuel was required to focus solely on his studies.

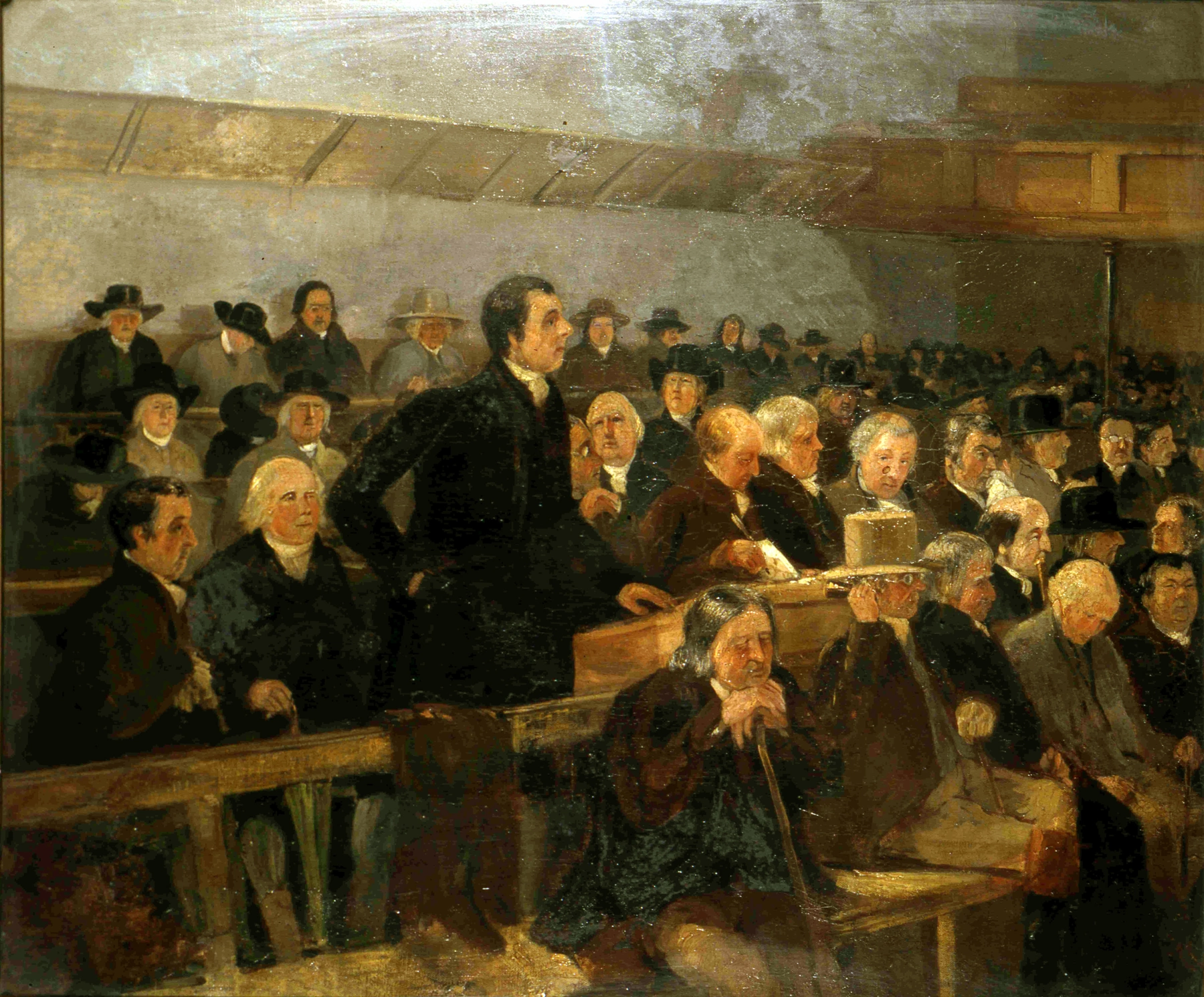
The London Yearly Meeting, circa. 1840, by Samuel Lucas

As an apprentice (first to a shipowner in Shoreham and then to a corn merchant in Wapping), Samuel strived to pursue his passion. Later on, after his mariage to Matilda Holmes, a pupil of John Bernay Crome, in 1837, he returned to the family business in Hitchin and carried on painting in his spare time.

=== Painting ===
Samuel Lucas predominantly used oils, watercolours and ink to depict beloved landscapes, wildlife and fauna, as well as local Hitchin characters. He rarely exhibited his work although we know that in 1828, he sent his painting The Ship Broxbournbury off the Islands of Amsterdam to the Royal Academy.

Samuel Lucas and his friend Jacob Thompson used to paint in the valley of Mardale, currently beneath Haweswater Reservoir in the Lake District.

Samuel Lucas's most famous painting, Hitchin Marketplace (1860), was very popular at the time and he was asked to paint miniature versions of the work.

=== Death ===
In 1865, Samuel Lucas developed paralysis and died five years later in Hitchin.

=== Personal life ===
Lucas was a member of Hitchin Quaker Meeting.

Samuel and his wife had six children together. Sadly, Mathilda died in childbirth in 1849. Thirteen years later, Samuel remarried Elizabeth Manser of Hertford, a poet.

Two of Samuel Lucas's daughters, Matilda and Ann(e) Mary, were skilled artists. They studied painting and pottery in Rome. Lucas's son, Samuel, as well as his own daughter, Florence Davy Thompson, the founding librarian of the University of Manitoba, also became accomplished painters.

== Legacy ==
A number of Samuel Lucas's works are held by the British Museum, the North Hertfordshire Museum and the Bingham Gallery. The Old Hitchin Market can be found at the Hitchin Corn Exchange. Samuel Lucas's botanical drawings are displayed in The Florist (Chapman and Hall) as well as in Reginald Hine’s History of Hitchin and Hitchin Worthies.

The junior school in Hitchin, Samuel Lucas JMI School, is named after him. It was inaugurated in 1975 by the Reverend Richard Lucas, a descendant of Samuel Lucas.

His biography, Samuel Lucas, His Life and Art Work by Reginald Hine, was published by Walkers Galleries Ltd in 1928.

North Hertfordshire Museum hosted an exhibition on Samuel Lucas from 9 September to 12 November 2023.
