= Bearton =

Human settlement in the United Kingdom

- Hamlet (former)
- Interactive map of Bearton
- Coordinates: 51.95777°N 0.28416°W
- Country: England
- County: Hertfordshire
- District: North Hertfordshire
- Town: Hitchin

Population (2021)
  - Total: 8,625

Bearton was a small hamlet lying to the north of Hitchin in Hertfordshire, England. It was incorporated into Hitchin over a century ago, and now forms part of the Hitchin Bearton ward of North Hertfordshire District Council. In the UK Census 2021 the population of Hitchin Bearton was 8,625.

The name Bearton survives in a number of street names - Bearton Road, Bearton Green, Bearton Avenue and Bearton Close. Bearton Lodge, on the corner of Bedford Road and Bearton Road, dates from the early 19th century. In the First World War, it was used as the guard house for the Royal Engineers Signal Depot Camp. It is now in private ownership.

The ward of Hitchin Bearton elects three councillors to North Hertfordshire District Council. Traditionally it has been a Labour ward, but in the May 2010 district council elections the Liberal Democrats won their first seat in the ward.

Bearton Green was the name of a large area of land to the north of Hitchin. The name survives as a 1930s built residential road. Adjacent to Bearton Green is a playing field known locally as St Michael's, as it was once the playing field of St Michael's College. The college itself was on the site now occupied by Hitchin police station.
