= Hitchin Highbury =

Electoral ward in Hertfordshire, England

Coordinates: 51.9460°N 0.2628°W

Hitchin Highbury is an electoral ward in Hitchin, Hertfordshire. It covers 230.174 hectares. It is a largely residential area bounded roughly to the north by the A505, to the south west by the A602, and by the railway line to the east. Schools in the ward include Highbury JMI and Whitehill Junior School.

The Red House, a large red brick house that used to be the seat of the owner of the orchards that made up most of the surrounding area up until the Industrial Revolution, is also found on Whitehill Road.

Wymondley Park FC is probably Hitchin's longest-established youth football club. It was started by parents of children at William Ransom school in 1981. It now caters for 200–250 players aged 8–18 years in around a dozen team, generally playing in the Royston Crow League. In 2009 a group of former Wymondley Park FC players formed an adult team playing in the Hitchin Sunday League, Wymondley Park Old Boys FC. They play at The Priory School in Hitchin.
