= Harold Briercliffe =

Harold Briercliffe (1910–1994) was an English author of a series of cycle touring guides. These were a spin-off from the magazine Cycling (a magazine now published as Cycling Weekly). They were cheaply made volumes with attractive colour print covers, designed to be kept in the pocket of saddlebags.

In 2010, Clare Balding presented a BBC TV series called Britain By Bike that retraced some of Briercliffe's routes using his old Dawes Super Galaxy.

As a result of the publicity arising from Clare Balding's television series, the popularity of the books rose greatly and three (north, south and central England) were republished by Batsford Books in 2012; with brief additions by Mark Jarman and Sustrans indicating that alternative routes exist to those suggested by Harold Briercliffe where those routes have become subject to heavy road traffic.

== Books ==
- (1947) Cycling Touring Guides. no. 1. Northern England
- (1947) Cycling Touring Guides. no. 2. Wales
- (1948) Cycling Touring Guides. no. 3. Scottish Highlands
- (1948) Cycling Touring Guides. no. 4. South West England
- (1949) Cycling Touring Guides. no. 5. The Midlands
- (1950) Cycling Touring Guides. no. 6. Southern England

All published by Temple Press

== Unpublished or abandoned ==
- Eastern England
- The Borderlands and Southern Scotland
- Ireland
