= Wymondley Roman Villa =

Ruined Roman villa in Hertfordshire, England

Coordinates: 51°56′52.85″N 0°14′39.54″W

Wymondley Roman Villa is a Roman site, which has often been described as a Roman villa, near Hitchin, Hertfordshire, England. It is also known as Ninesprings Roman Villa. Recent archaeology interpreted the ruins as a bathhouse connected to a complex of ritual buildings and not a villa.

It is situated in the valley of the River Purwell, where the river forms a boundary between the outskirts of Hitchin and the largely rural parish of Great Wymondley. In Roman times, as now, the site would have been above a wetland. This natural feature is protected as the Purwell Ninesprings nature reserve.

== Excavation and access ==
The site was partly excavated in 1884, revealing the remains of several rooms. Three of the rooms were heated by hypocaust. Such heating systems were often used for residential accommodation, and the remains have traditionally been described as a villa. However, Historic England has referred to the scope for further investigation, pointing out deficiencies in what was known about the site. It has been posited that the 19th-century investigation revealed the integral bath suite of a villa, or alternatively a separate bathhouse.

Studies of the site were conducted in 2021 and 2022 by North Hertfordshire Museum, a second and possibly a third building were located on the site. Fieldwalking revealed little evidence of domestic occupation, and there has been speculation that the site had ritual purposes and that the buildings included a nymphaeum.

The site, which is now under farmland, can be accessed via the Hitchin outer orbital path (HOOP).

== Finds ==
Finds at the site include Roman mosaic, and Roman currency including a coin hoard, believed to have been deposited in the 3rd century, which consisted of radiates. On the evidence of coins found at the site, the building complex may have been established shortly after 200 with occupation continuing until the 4th century.

== Wymondley in Roman times ==
As well as the "villa" site, there were Roman buildings in the centre of the modern village.

East of the River Purwell there is an agricultural landscape extending towards Graveley, where a Roman road leads towards Baldock. In the 20th century, Applebaum speculated that some of the land was farmed by tenants of the villa's owners, but we do not know on basis the Romans allotted land in this part of Hertfordshire. However, we do know that the landscape is likely to preserve a field system of Roman origin; this early date for the field boundaries of Wymondley was posited by Frederic Seebohm in the late 19th century (around the time the villa was excavated). The landscape we see today has been affected by enclosure in the 19th century and other relatively recent changes, but Seebohm, who lived in Hitchin, was able to study maps of the medieval open fields. His theory regarding fossilised Roman boundaries at Wymondley is largely accepted by later scholars.

== Continuity between Roman and Anglo-Saxon Wymondley ==
On the evidence of the continuity in field boundaries, the Anglo-Saxon settlement did not make a big change in the way the land was managed. (Seebohm believed that this did not only apply to Wymondley and he emphasised similarities between the Roman villa as an institution and the manor, arguing that the medieval manor can be explained as an amalgamation of the Roman villa with the Germanic tribal system). However, the life-style of the Anglo-Saxon elite would have been different from their Romano-British predecessors. Excavations at Wymondley found evidence of "squatter hearths" . These features indicate activity, probably in the post-Roman period, by people who had no use for the luxurious installations such as heating by hypocaust and mosaic flooring. (Similar post-Roman features have been identified at sites like Chedworth Roman Villa).
