= Hannath Marshall =

Hannath Arnold Marshall (1883–1962) was Dean of Nassau from 1945 to 1947.

He was educated at Jesus College, Cambridge and ordained in 1908. After curacies in Hinckley and Germiston he held incumbencies in Johannesburg, Pilgrim's Rest, Royston and Great Wymondley. During the Great War, Marshall served in German East Africa as a corporal in the S Africa Medical Corps and, from 1916, as chaplain to the 5th and 6th South African infantry. In June 1917, he was interviewed in England for a commission as a Temporary Chaplain to the Forces, was described as ‘Bright, suitable’ and, after his appointment, was posted to France. However, he was gassed, and his recovery was delayed by a recurrence of malaria contracted in East Africa. He returned to France after convalescence, and ended the war as Senior Chaplain to 47th Division. He was Priest in charge of Exuma before his time as Dean, and Vicar general of Nassau afterwards.
