= St Leonard's Church, Bengeo =

Church in Hertfordshire, England

Coordinates: 51.8053°N 0.0800°W

St Leonard's, Bengeo
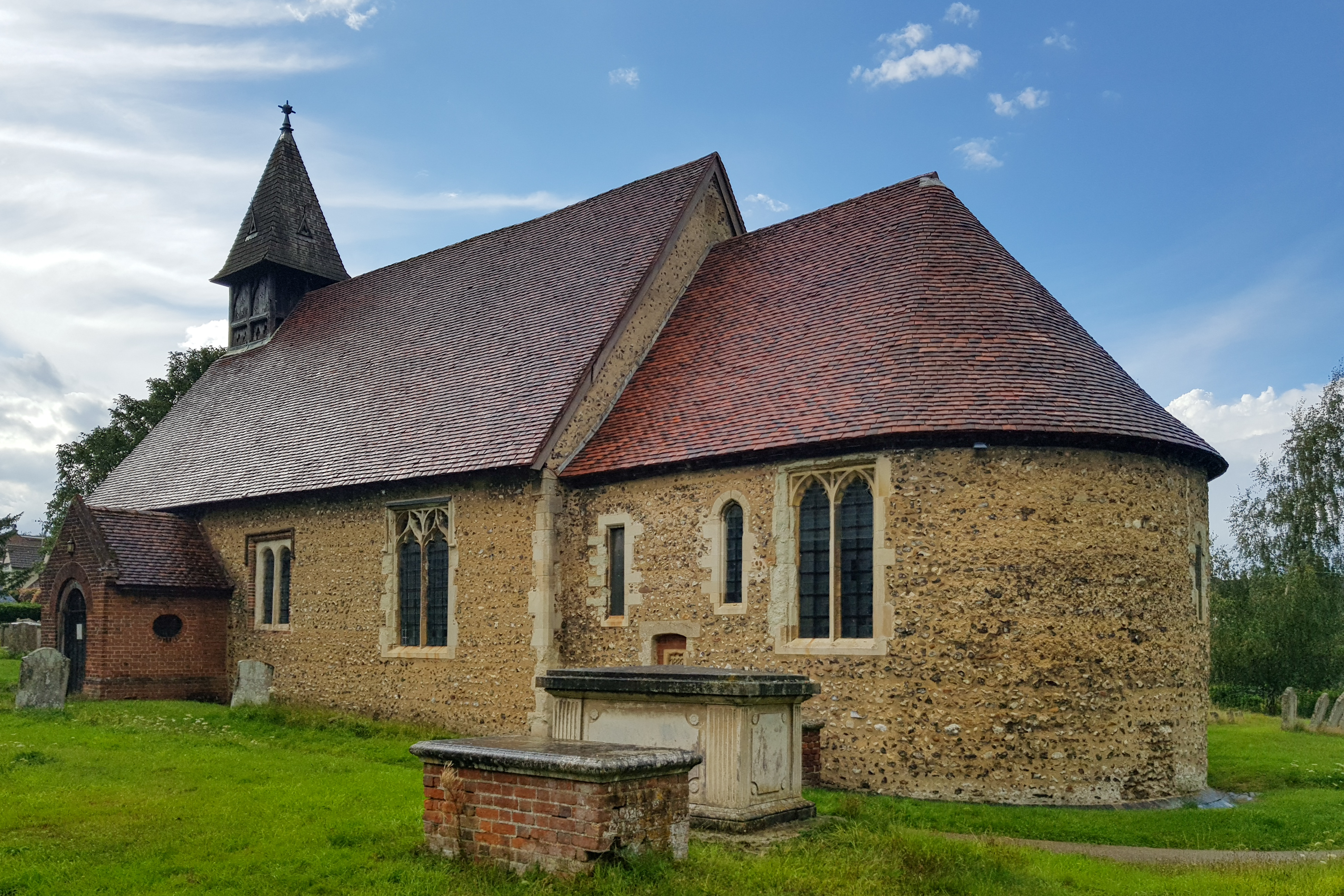
- St Leonard's Church, Bengeo, Hertfordshire
- St Leonard's, Bengeo
- OS grid reference: TL 33018 13638
- Location: Bengeo
- Country: England
- Denomination: Church of England

History
- Dedication: St Leonard

Architecture
- Heritage designation: Grade I
- Architectural type: Parish church
- Years built: 1120

Administration
- Diocese: St Albans
- Archdeaconry: Hertford
- Parish: Bengeo

The Church of Saint Leonard is a Norman church in Bengeo, Hertfordshire, England. Located on the hillside overlooking the shared Beane and Lea valley, the Grade I Listed church dates from about 1120, and is the oldest building in Hertford.

== History ==
The building served as the parish church of Bengeo until the larger Holy Trinity Church was opened in 1855, after which St Leonard's was stripped of its fittings and stood empty and unused for some years. The Gosselin family of nearby Bengeo Hall commissioned John Thomas Micklethwaite to restore and refit the church between 1884 and 1894. In the 13th century, against the north-east end of the chancel, was an anchorite's cell which consisted of a wooden hut. Of eight feet by six feet, there was a recess in the wall for the anchorite’s bed and seat, and an access to the church.

== Architecture ==
The church is built of flint with stone dressings and has a tiled roof.

The wooden west bellcote dates from the 19th-century restoration. The bellcote houses a single bell, dated 1636.

The south doorway dates from the 12th century, with the addition of a Georgian brick porch. The south door itself dates from the 14th century.

=== Apse ===
The apse is an unusual feature, found in only two other medieval churches in Hertfordshire, St John the Baptist, Great Amwell, and St Mary's, Great Wymondley. The roof dates from the 19th-century restoration.

== Interior ==
The nave is coated with plaster with an open collar-beam roof. Remains of medieval wall paintings were uncovered during restoration work in 1938 by William Weir.

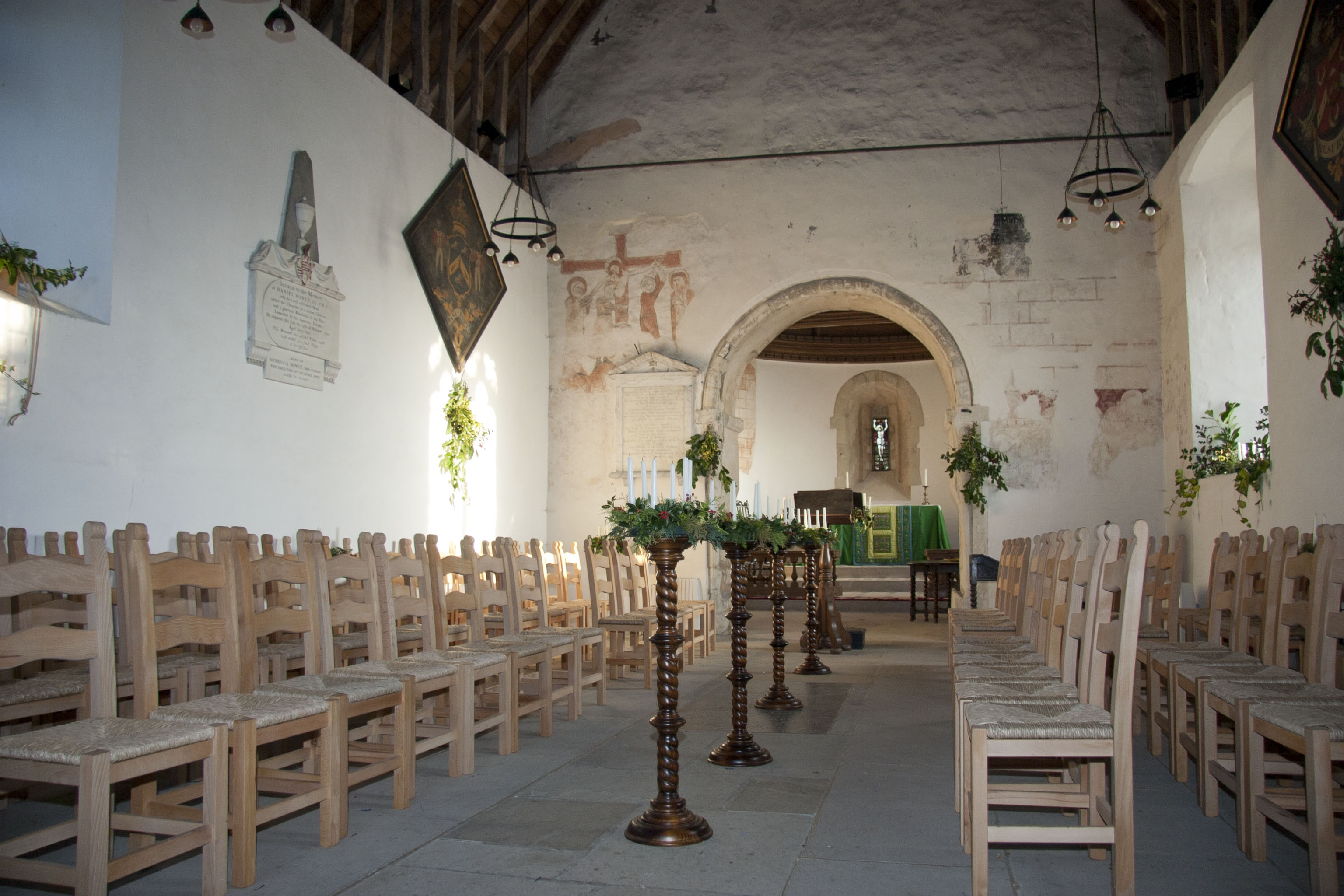
Interior showing medieval wall painting and Norman chancel arch

The church is used for Sunday services during summer months, and also hosts exhibitions and concerts.

== Gallery ==
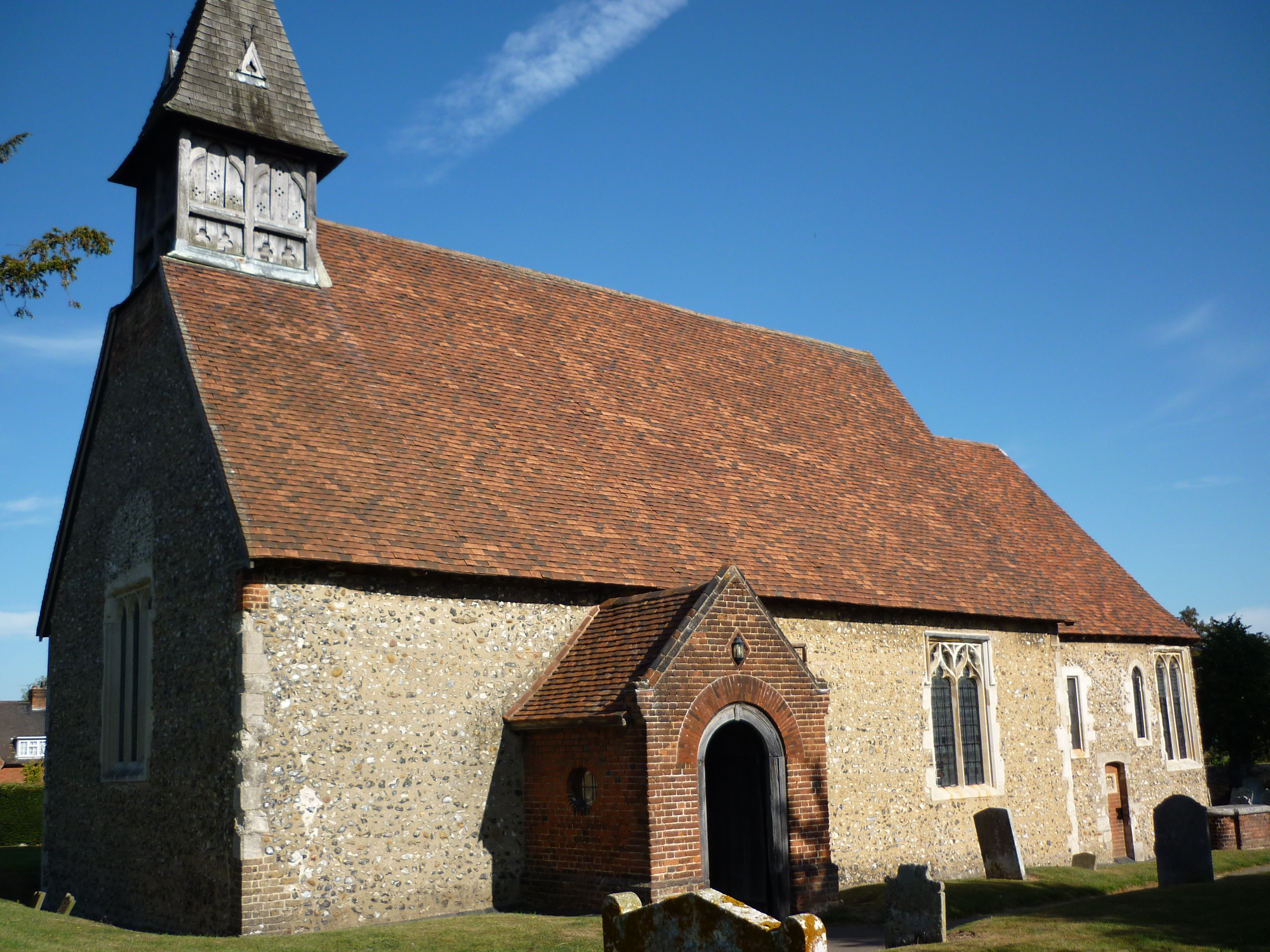
St Leonard's Church – porch, west wall and modern wooden bellcote

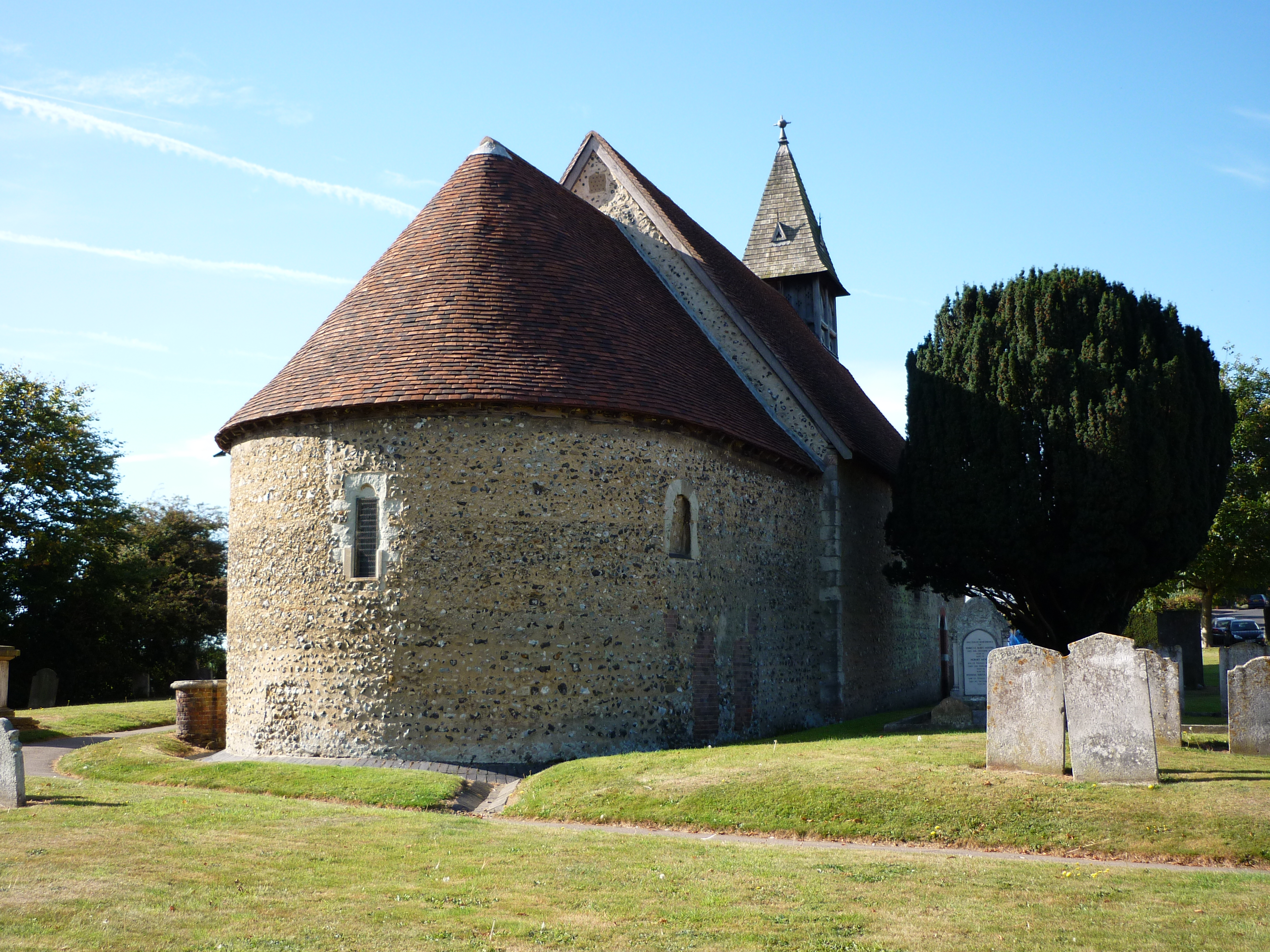
St Leonard's Church – the east end of the church with its apse

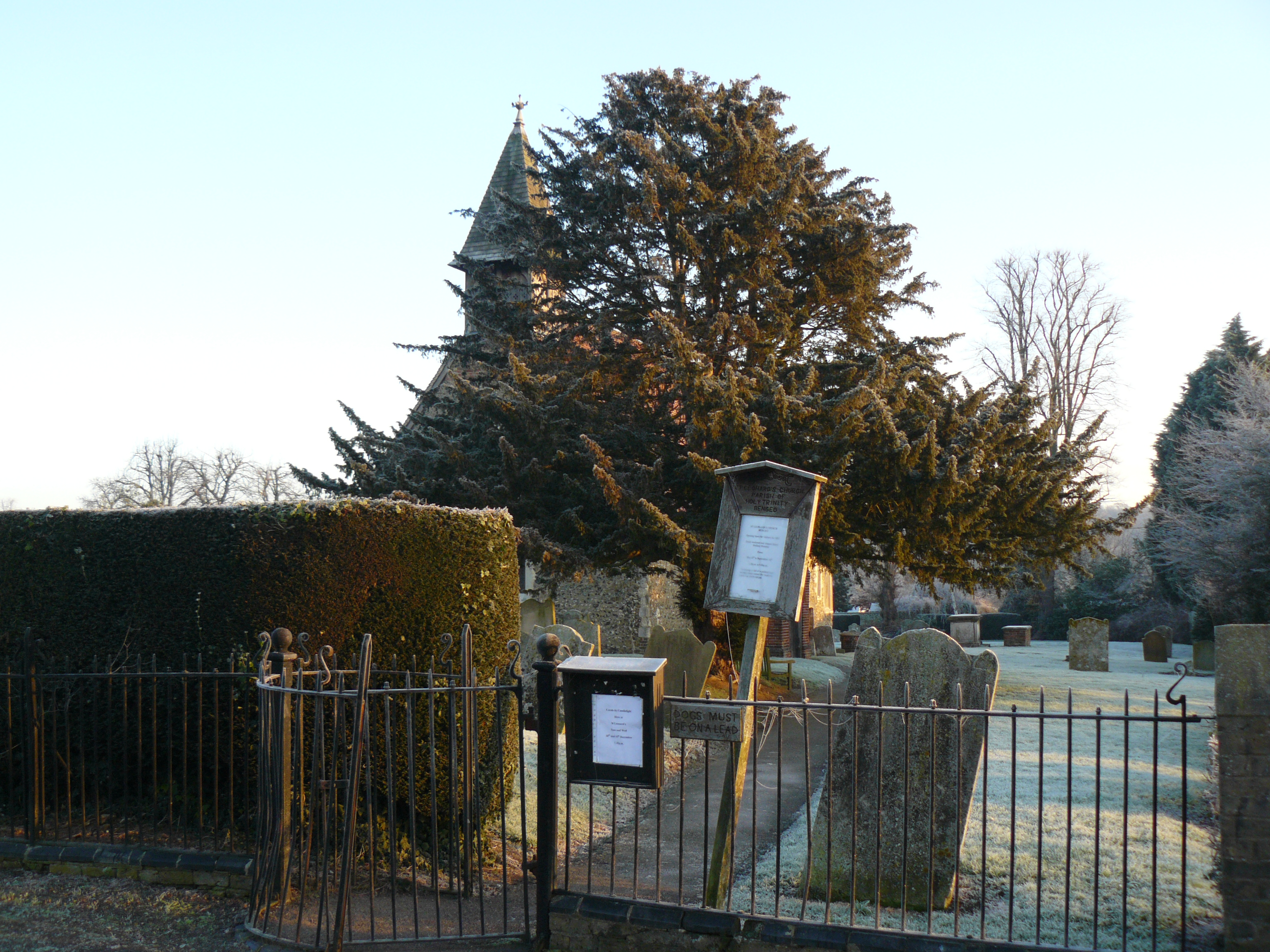
St Leonard's churchyard.

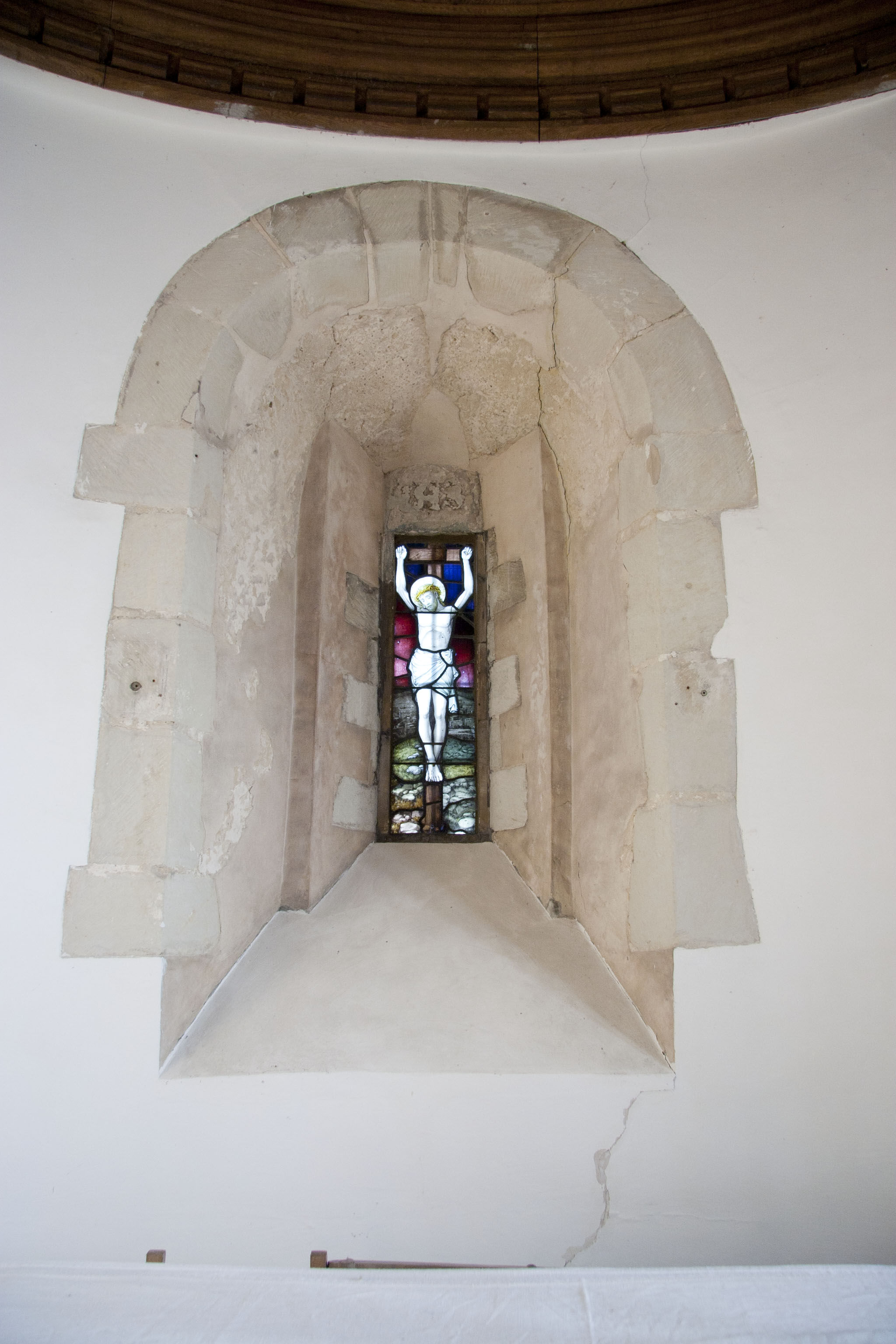
Stained-glass window

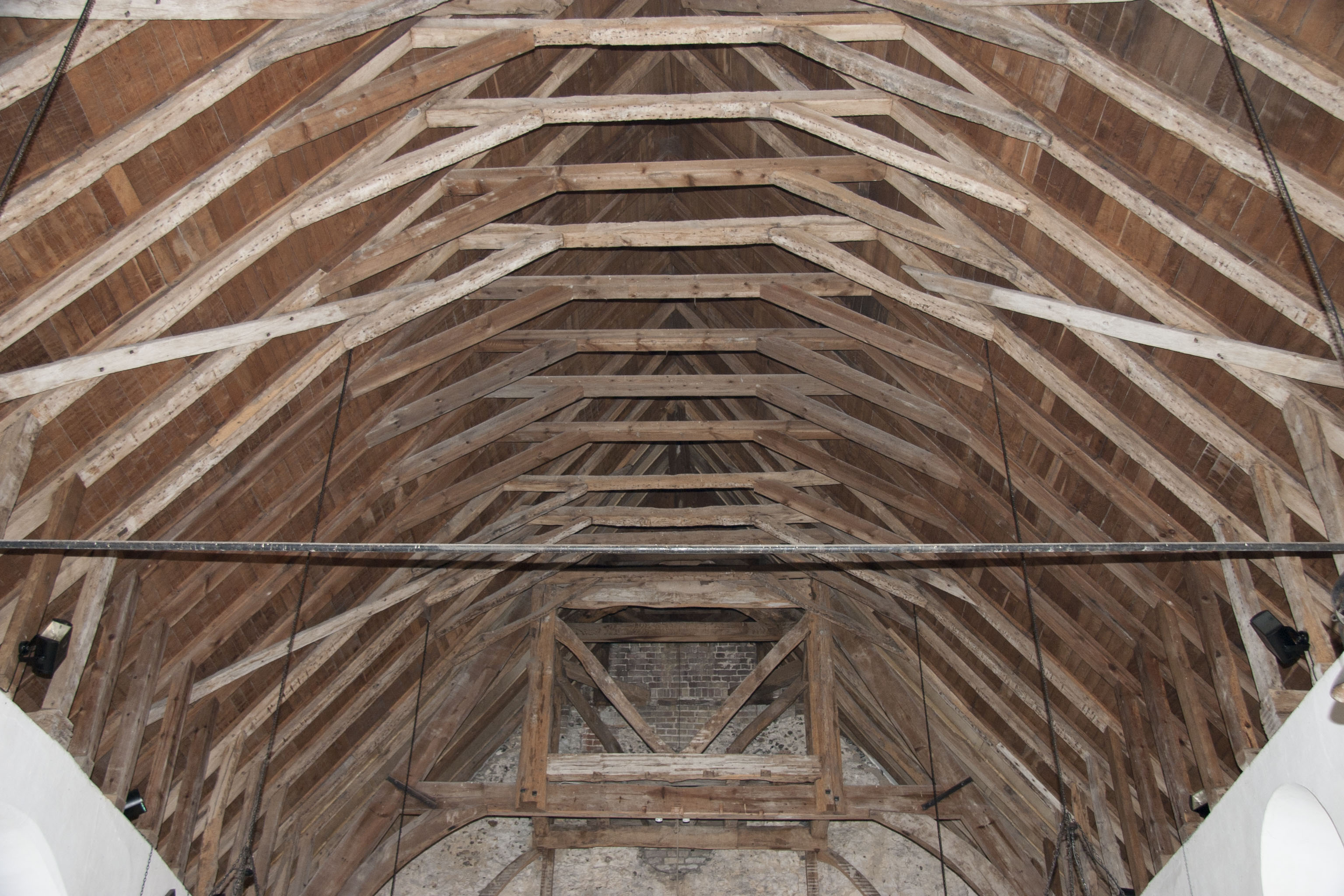
Roof timbers
