= Church of St Mary the Virgin, Great Wymondley =

Church in Hertfordshire, England

Church of St Mary the Virgin
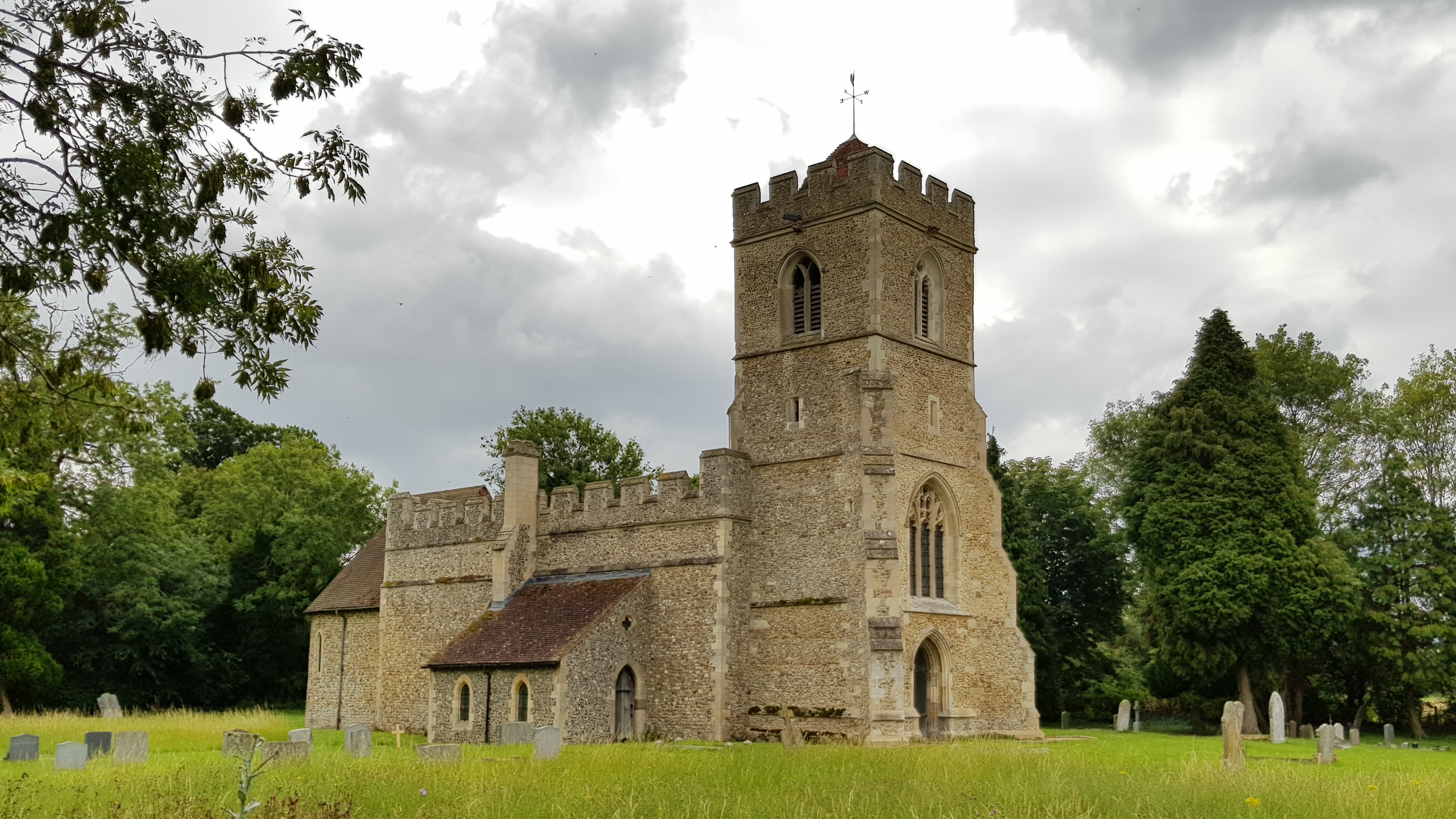
- View of the church
- Church of St Mary the Virgin
- 51°56′31″N 0°14′03″W
- OS grid reference: TL 21475 28530
- Country: England
- Denomination: Church of England

History
- Status: Active

Architecture
- Heritage designation: Grade I listed
- Designated: 1968

Administration
- Diocese: Diocese of St Albans

St Mary's Church is an active Anglican church in Great Wymondley, Hertfordshire, England. It is a Grade I listed building.

== History ==
In 1199, Reginald de Argentein, lord of the manor of Great Wymondley, brought a case against the Abbess of Elstow over the advowson of the chapel, as it then was. The Abbess claimed that the chapel was part of the possessions of the church at Hitchin, and had been granted to the Abbey by Judith of Lens, niece of William I. Richard lost the case. Although vicars were appointed to Great Wymondley from 1361, the church remained under Elstow Abbey until the Dissolution.

The benefice is currently St Ippolyts with Great and Little Wymondley.

== Architecture ==
It has a Norman nave and chancel, the latter being an apse built of small rounded stones. Only two other medieval churches in Hertfordshire retain an apse (St Leonard's Church, Bengeo and St John the Baptist's Church, Great Amwell), but originally the church at Little Wymondley had an apsidal east end too.
