= Frederic Seebohm =

Frederic Seebohm may refer to:

- Frederic Seebohm (historian) (1833–1912), British economic historian
- Frederic Seebohm, Baron Seebohm (1909–1990), British life peer and banker; grandson and namesake of the historian
