= Wymondley Castle =

Ruined castle in Great Wymondley, England

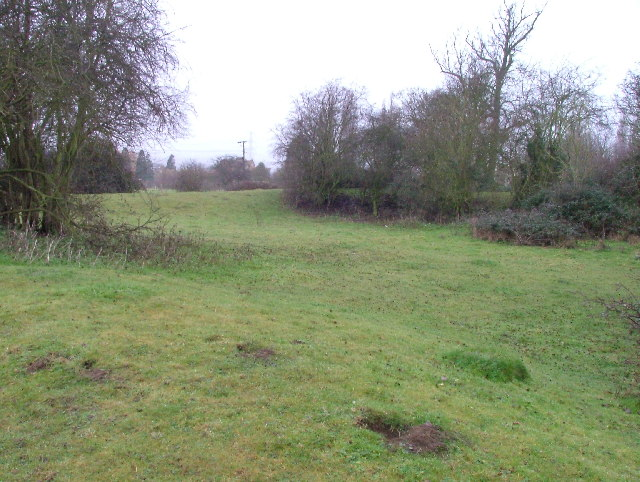
The remains of Wymondley Castle

Wymondley Castle, also known as Great Wymondley Castle, is a ruined castle in the village of Great Wymondley, near Hitchin in Hertfordshire, England.

It has been seen as being part of a group of unlicensed (adulterine) castles in Hertfordshire, including Pirton and Therfield. The castle was possibly erected by the Argentein family, who were of Norman origin. They were lords of the manor and are associated with St Mary's church near the castle which dates from the 12th century.

== Description ==
Only earthworks remain. The castle is of the "motte and bailey" type. It is set in a rectangular feature which Historic England describes as a "manorial enclosure". This feature possibly dates from Roman times (there is evidence of Roman occupation). Historic England suggests archaeological investigation is needed to establish its use.

== Conservation ==
The remains are protected as an ancient monument, "Great Wymondley Castle: a motte and bailey castle and associated manorial enclosure 20m east of St Mary's Church, Great Wymondley".
