= Rickman Godlee =

English surgeon (1849–1925)

Sir Rickman Godlee KCVO
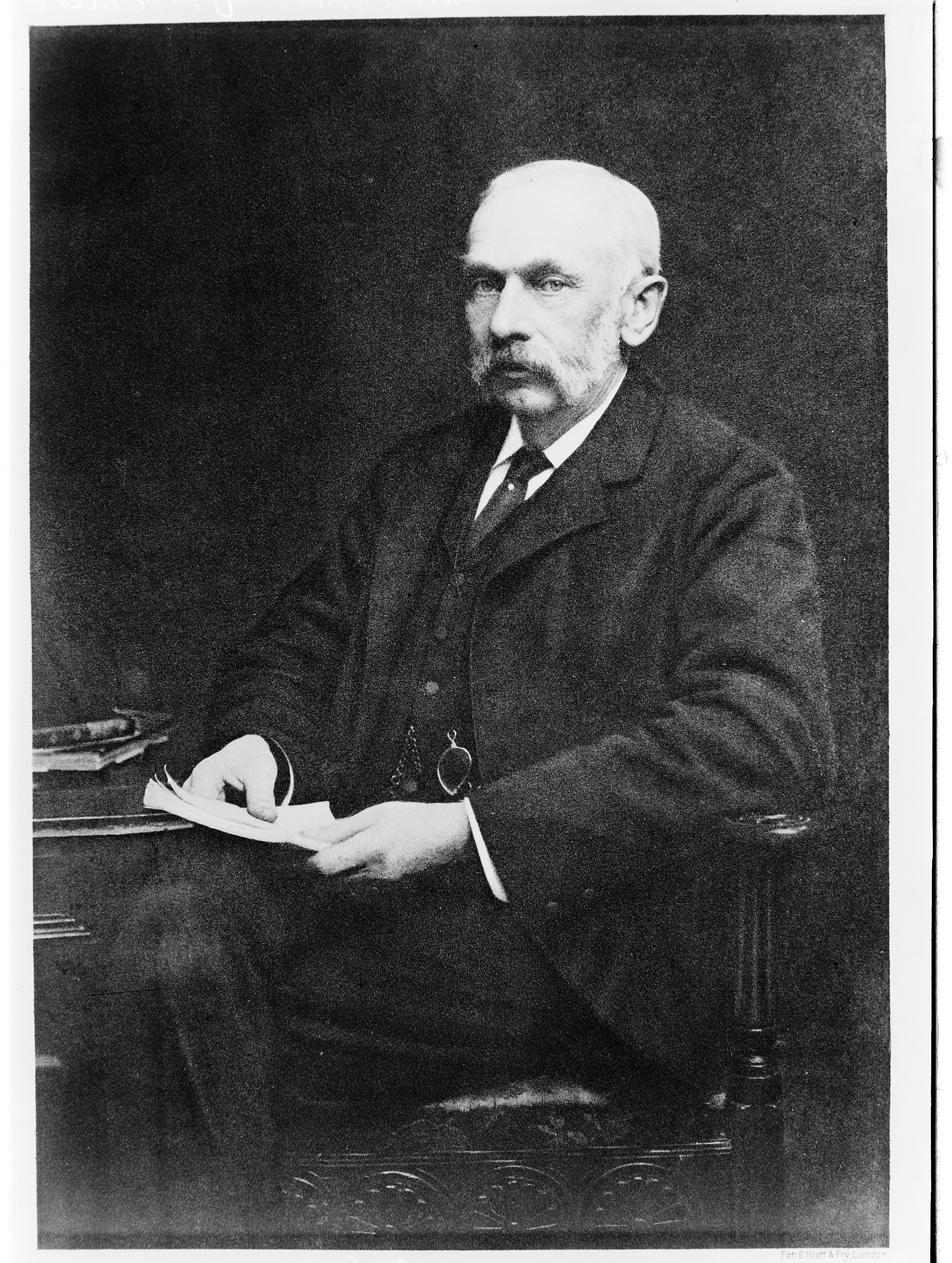
- Portrait of Sir Rickman John Godlee Wellcome
- Born: 15 February 1849; Upton, Essex, England
- Died: 18 April 1925 (aged 76); Whitchurch-on-Thames, Oxfordshire, England
- Education: University College London
- Known for: First to surgically remove a brain tumour

Signature
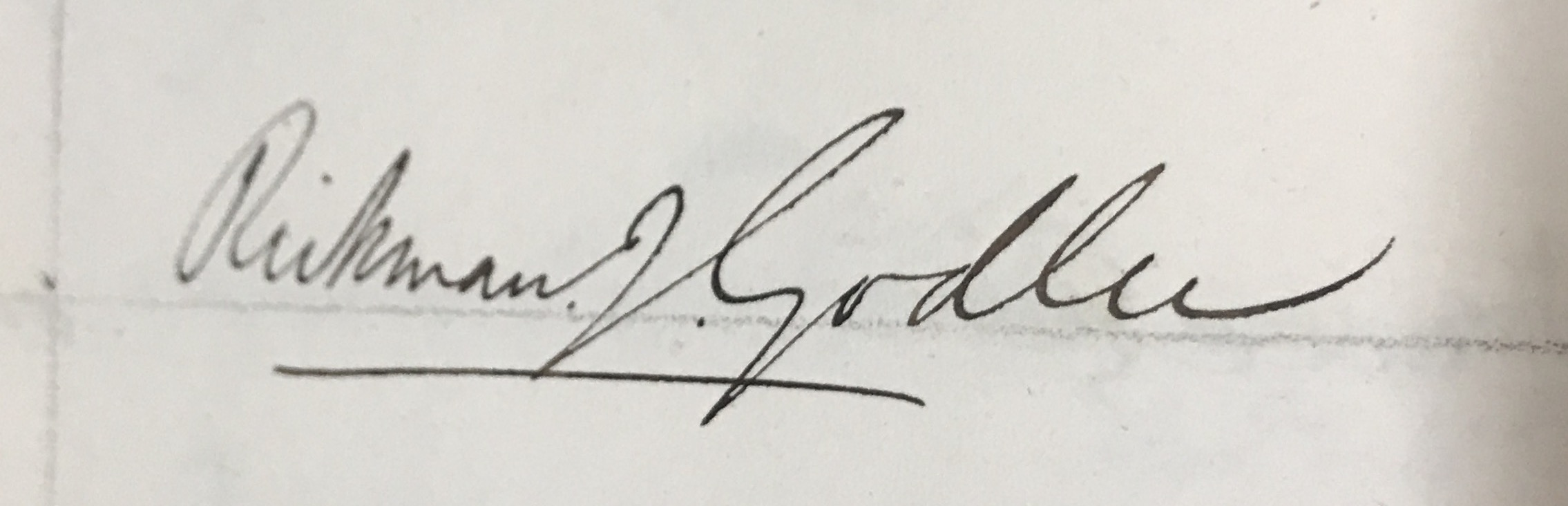

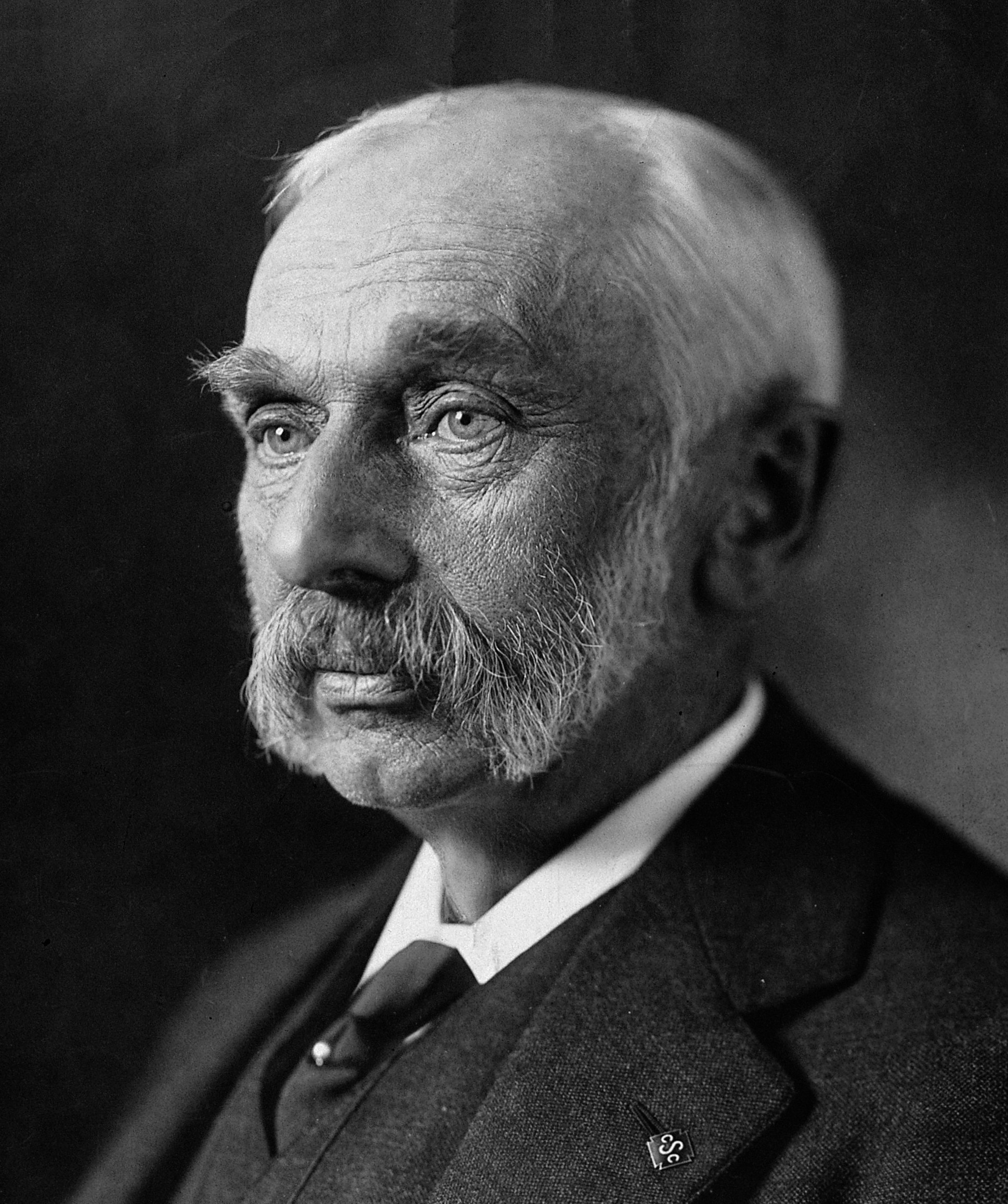
Rickman Godlee

Sir Rickman John Godlee, 1st Baronet KCVO (15 February 1849 – 18 April 1925) was an English surgeon. In 1884 he became one of the first doctors to surgically remove a brain tumor, founding modern brain surgery.

== Early life ==
Godlee was born in Upton, Essex, to a Quaker family, the second son of Rickman Godlee (1804–1871), a barrister at Middle Temple, and Mary Godlee (née Lister), daughter of Joseph Jackson Lister. He was thus a nephew of Joseph Lister — whose biography he later wrote.

He was educated at a school in Tottenham and took his B.A. at University College London before he began his medical education.

An expert draughtsman, and whilst still at University College London, he was employed to make the original plates for Richard Quain's Anatomy — which in 1920 he presented to the Royal College of Surgeons of England.

== Medical career ==
He was admitted a Member of the Royal College of Surgeons in 1872 and four years later was elected to the fellowship, in the meantime he won gold medal at both his Bachelor and Master of Surgery examinations at the University of London.

After periods as house surgeon and house physician at University College Hospital, London, he moved to Edinburgh to practise the new surgical techniques being developed there by his uncle, Joseph Lister. On his return to London, he was appointed assistant surgeon at Charing Cross Hospital and to a similar position at the North Eastern Hospital for Children. After a period as assistant surgeon at University College Hospital, he became surgeon at Brompton Hospital, London, where he made advances in surgery of the chest.

At the Epileptic Hospital, Regent's Park on 25 November 1884, he became the first to perform a surgical primary removal of a brain tumor after physician Alexander Hughes Bennett (1848-1901) had diagnosed the location using neurological findings alone.

In 1885 he was appointed surgeon at University College Hospital and Emeritus Professor of Clinical Surgery there in 1892. He served as President of the Royal College of Surgeons from 1911 to 1913 and of the Royal Society of Medicine from 1916 to 1918.

He was appointed Surgeon to the Household of Queen Victoria and Surgeon Ordinary to Edward VII and to George V, created a baronet 'of Whitchurch in the County of Oxford' on 6 July 1912 and appointed a Knight Commander of the Royal Victorian Order (KCVO) in the 1914 New Year Honours.

== Family life ==
He married Juliet Mary Seebohm, a daughter of Frederic Seebohm, in 1891. After his retirement in 1920 they moved from London to Coombe End, Whitchurch-on-Thames, Oxfordshire, where he died at the age of 76 on 18 April 1925.

== A tribute in The Times ==
The author of his obituary in The Times wrote:

"Rickman Godlee was a remarkable man. His Quaker upbringing and ancestry left their marks upon him. Scrupulously honest in thought and conscientious in detail, he took nothing for granted that he had not himself investigated. Quiet in manner, reserved in character, and rather sarcastic, he was apt to be under-estimated in early life by those who only knew him superficially. His sterling worth came to be recognised later, and he showed himself a firm but dignified and courteous ruler during his term of office as President of the Royal College of Surgeons. He was not only a good surgeon and a fine artist, but he was a linguist, a carpenter, a poet, a botanist, an ornithologist, and an oarsman, while his great knowledge of books made him an admirable honorary librarian at the Royal Medico-Chirurgical Society of Medicine. … Lister's Life could only have been written by Godlee, whose veneration for his uncle was unbounded. He alone knew the minute details of his life and practice, for as a young man he was usually left in charge of the patients on whom Lister had operated in private. With access to his papers and letters, and from personal recollections, he could remember the simple life led by members of the Society of Friends, which is so charming a feature of his Life of Lord Lister."

== See also ==
- List of honorary medical staff at King Edward VII's Hospital for Officers

== Publications ==
- 'The Past Present and Future of the School for Advanced Medical Studies of University College London', John Bale Sons and Danielsson, London, 1907
- 'Lord Lister', Macmillan & Co, London, 1917
- 'A Village on the Thames: Whitchurch, Yesterday and To-day', George Allen & Unwin, London, 1926

== Sources ==
- Obituary in The Times, Tuesday 21 April 1925, p.19, column 2.

Baronetage of the United Kingdom
New creation	Baronet (of Coombe End); 1912–1925	Extinct
Preceded by Claughton baronets	Godlee baronets of Coombe End; 6 July 1912	Succeeded by Samuel baronets
