= Wymondley =

Civil parish in Hertfordshire, England

Coordinates: 51.93443°N 0.23888°W

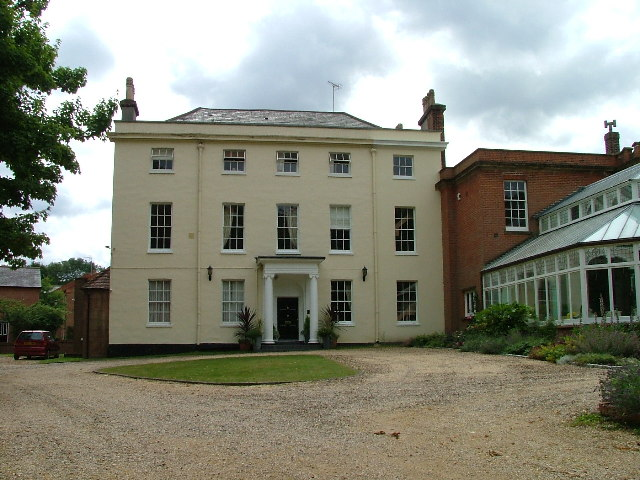
- Wymondley House

- Location within Hertfordshire
- Population: 1,169 (Parish, 2021)
- OS grid reference: TL212276
- District: North Hertfordshire
- Shire county: Hertfordshire
- Region: East
- Country: England
- Sovereign state: United Kingdom
- Post town: HITCHIN
- Postcode district: SG4
- Dialling code: 01438
- Police: Hertfordshire
- Fire: Hertfordshire
- Ambulance: East of England
- UK Parliament: Hitchin

Wymondley is a civil parish in the North Hertfordshire district of Hertfordshire, England. It includes the villages of Little Wymondley and Great Wymondley and a number of smaller hamlets, including Redcoats Green, Todd's Green, and Titmore Green.

== History ==
The parish was created on 1 April 1937 as a merger of the two former parishes of Great Wymondley and Little Wymondley. Prior to the creation of North Hertfordshire in 1974, Wymondley was part of Hitchin Rural District.

Wymondley was once the location of a dissenting academy for the education of future nonconformist ministers. The academy was active during 1799-1833 and went under various names, including Wymondley College.

== Geography ==
Wymondley electrical grid substation, named after the parish, is actually just over the boundary to the south-west, in the neighbouring parish of St Ippolyts.

== Governance ==
There are three tiers of local government covering Wymondley, at parish, district, and county level: Wymondley Parish Council, North Hertfordshire District Council, and Hertfordshire County Council. For national elections, the parish forms part of the Hitchin constituency.

== Population ==
At the 2021 census, the parish had a population of 1,169. The population had been 1,153 in 2011.
