= Gosmore =

Hamlet in Hertfordshire, England

Coordinates: 51°56′N 0°16′W

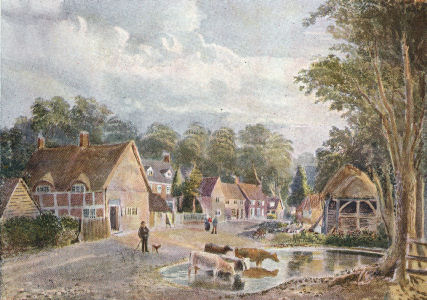
Gosmore(before 1870) by Samuel Lucas (1805-1870).

Gosmore is a hamlet in the parish of St Ippolyts (where the population at the 2011 Census was included) near Hitchin in Hertfordshire, England. One interesting feature is Bunyan's Dell, a natural amphitheatre deep inside Wain Wood where the author of The Pilgrim's Progress preached in secret when his faith was persecuted after the Restoration.
