= Purwell Meadows =

Nature reserve in Hitchin, Hertfordshire, England

Coordinates: 51.9538°N 0.2552°W

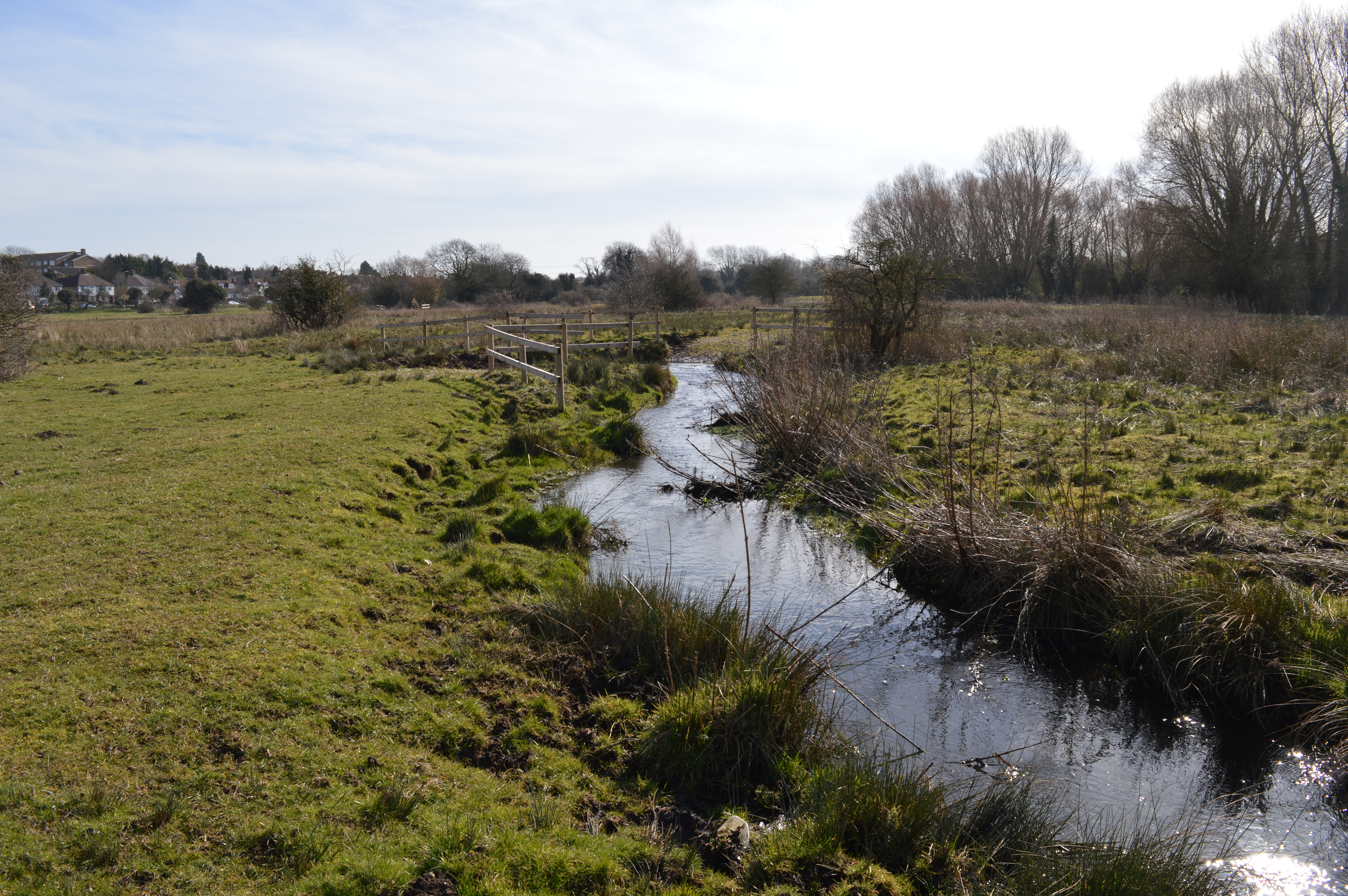
The river Purwell, at Purwell Meadows

Purwell Meadows is an 8.6-hectare (21-acre) nature reserve in Hitchin, Hertfordshire, England. It was declared a Local Nature Reserve in 1994. It is owned and managed by North Hertfordshire District Council.

The River Purwell runs through the meadows: it has been modified to provide power to a watermill which is no longer in operation. Wildlife includes kingfishers and water voles.

There is also a football pitch, a basketball court and a junior play area.

There is access from Cambridge Road, Purwell Lane and Willian Road.

== See also ==
- List of Sites of Special Scientific Interest in Hertfordshire
