= Great Wymondley =

Village in Hertfordshire, England

Coordinates: 51.94237°N 0.23626944°W

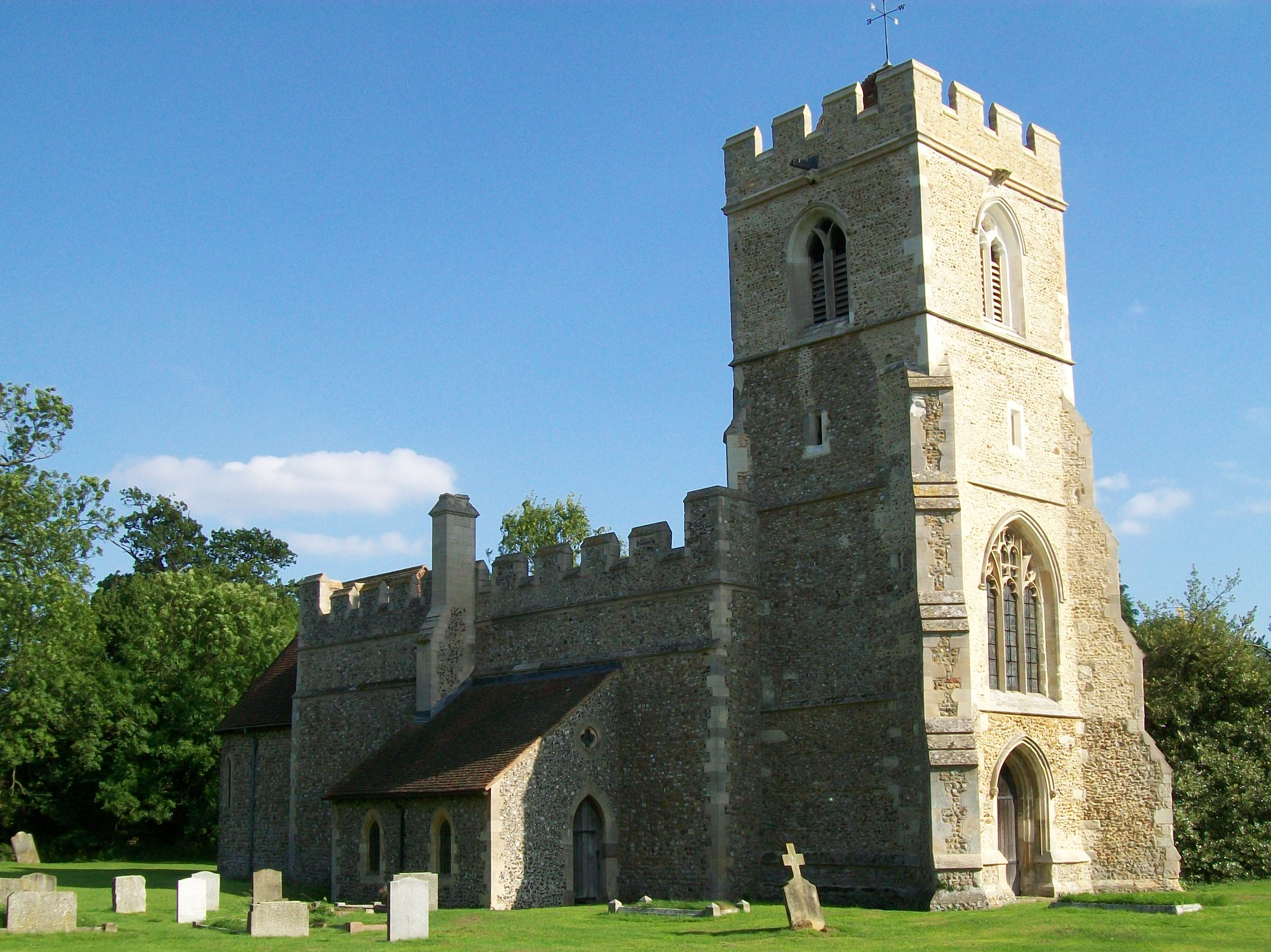
- St Mary's Church, Great Wymondley

- Location within Hertfordshire
- OS grid reference: TL213287
- Civil parish: Wymondley
- District: North Hertfordshire
- Shire county: Hertfordshire
- Region: East
- Country: England
- Sovereign state: United Kingdom
- Post town: Hitchin
- Postcode district: SG4
- Dialling code: 01438
- Police: Hertfordshire
- Fire: Hertfordshire
- Ambulance: East of England
- UK Parliament: Hitchin

Great Wymondley is a village in the civil parish of Wymondley, in the North Hertfordshire district of Hertfordshire, England. It lies 2 miles (3 km) east of Hitchin. Despite the names, Great Wymondley is now smaller than its neighbour, Little Wymondley.

== History ==
=== Roman ===
The Wymondley area was inhabited in Roman times. Wymondley Roman Villa lies to the west of the village near Ninesprings in the valley of the River Purwell. Traditionally, the site has been interpreted as a Roman villa, but following excavations, more recent thinking is that the remains are a bathhouse.

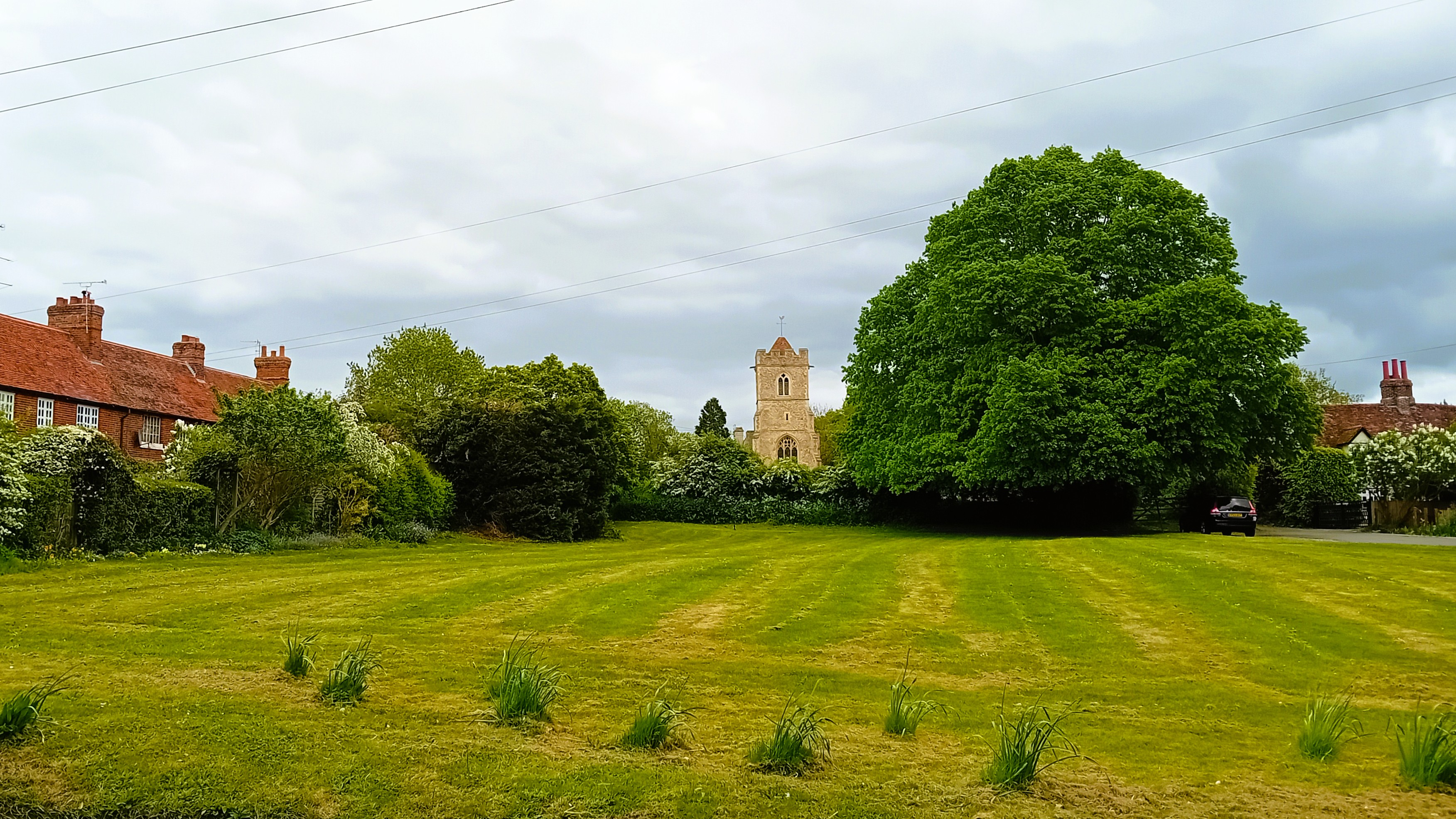
Church Green looking towards St Mary's Church

In the late 19th century the historian Frederic Seebohm, who lived in Hitchin, studied the layout of local villages, including Wymondley's field system. In publications such as The English Village Community (1883), he looked at continuity between Roman and English villages. Seebohm was aware that there was a Roman road east of Wymondley, passing through Graveley on the way to Baldock. He was also aware of research that had been done on the work of Roman land surveyors (known as gromatici) on sites elsewhere in Europe that preserved more evidence of the Roman landscape. As well as aligning roads, Roman land surveyors were involved in delineating field boundaries for the system of land division called centuriation.

Seebohm argued that Wymondley's open-field system, as recorded on detailed manorial maps, incorporated old boundaries and in particular fossilised Roman boundaries. He suggested that the dimensions of the fields to the west of the Roman road reflect the use of an ancient unit of measurement called the jugerum. Assuming the validity of this analysis, which according to Michael Wood has been confirmed at least in part by later scholars, it is implied that:

- there was territorial reorganisation in Roman times
- there was continuity in the way the land was managed before and after the Anglo-Saxon settlement of this part of Hertfordshire. Toponyms also supply some evidence for continuity, for example the village of Wallington near Baldock appears to have been named by the Anglo-Saxons after its Romano-British population.

=== Medieval ===
The Domesday Book of 1086 records 58 households at Wymondley, with the land being divided between four owners. It does not distinguish between Great Wymondley and Little Wymondley, but later historians have deduced that the lands of Gosbert of Beauvais and those held directly by King William correspond to Great Wymondley, whilst the lands of Robert Gernon and Odo of Bayeux were Little Wymondley.

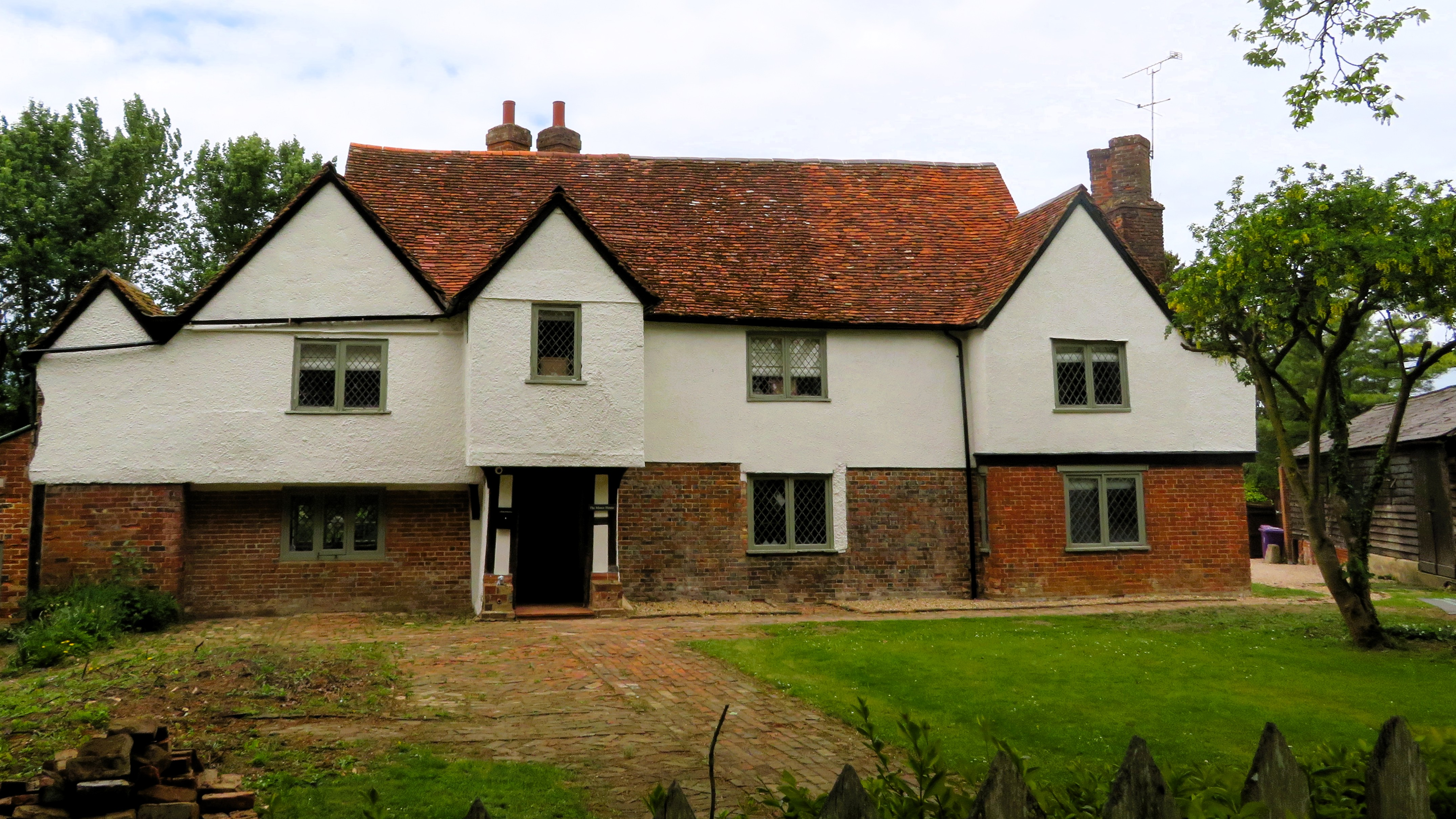
Manor House

A motte-and-bailey castle known as Wymondley Castle was built on a site immediately east of the parish church, possibly during The Anarchy of 1138 to 1153. The castle did not endure for long, and only earthworks remain.

Wymondley was anciently part of the parish of Hitchin. There was a church at Great Wymondley by the 12th century, which was originally a chapel of ease to St Mary's Church, Hitchin. The church at Great Wymondley had its own clergy by the early 13th century and Great Wymondley was thereafter treated as a separate parish, although it retained some ties to Hitchin until the Reformation in the 16th century. Around the same time that Great Wymondley became a parish, a church was also built at Little Wymondley, which had become a separate parish by 1235. The boundary between the two parishes of Great Wymondley and Little Wymondley was complex, as was often the case with parishes created at this time out of a previously united territory. Both parishes had detached parcels of land in the area around Titmore Green and Todds Green at the southern end of the old Wymondley territory.

Great Wymondley's parish church of St Mary the Virgin is a Grade I listed building. It has a Norman nave and chancel, the latter being an apse built of small rounded stones.

The Manor House, at the corner of Hitchin Road and Willian Road, dates back to the 15th century.

=== Later history ===
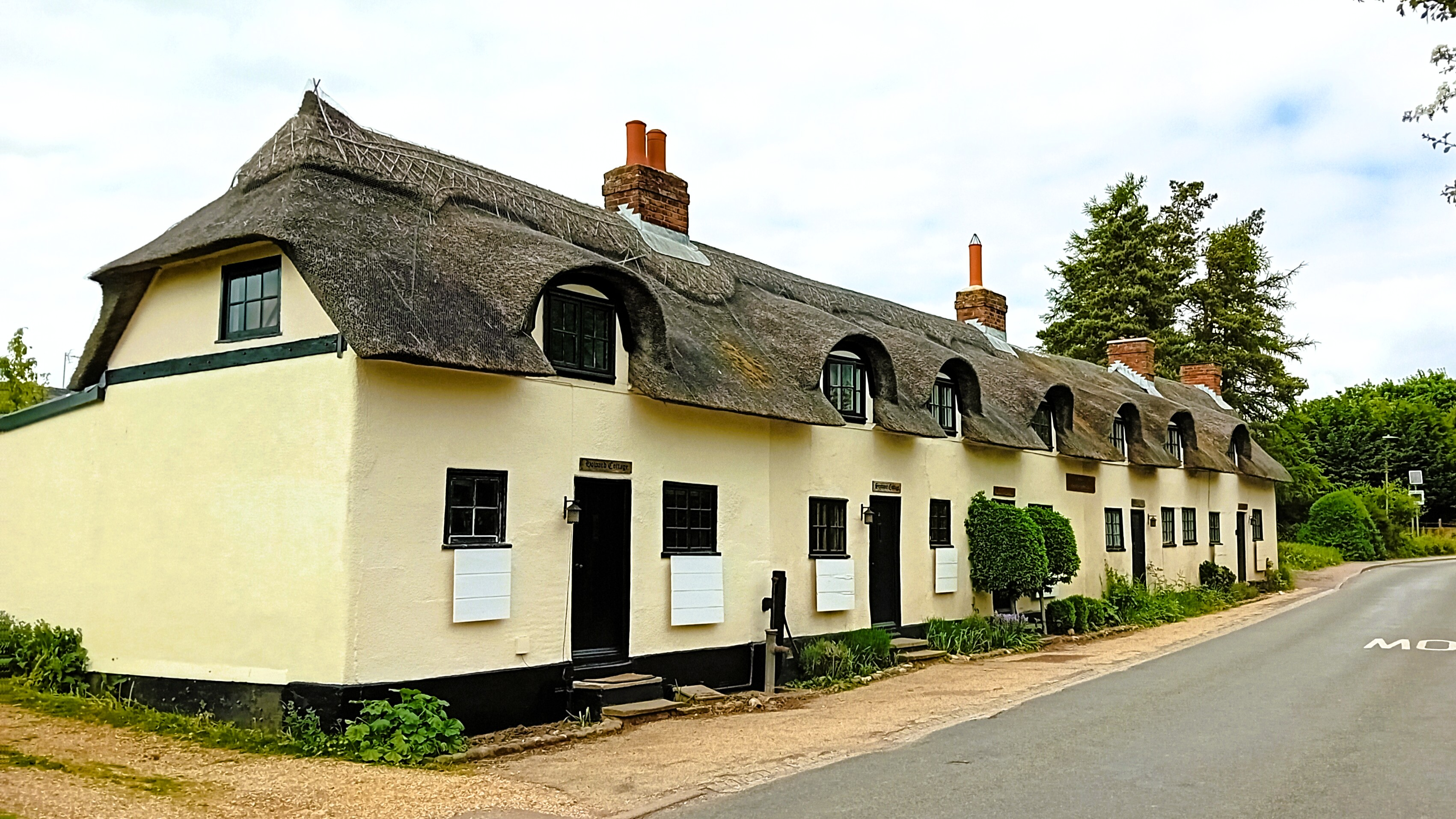
Hornbeam Court: Five (originally six) cottages, each named after one of Henry VIII's wives

Delamere House is an elegant Elizabethan building. There are also a number of thatched cottages, including a row of terraced cottages called Hornbeam Court on Arch Road, built in 1818, each of which is named after one of Henry VIII's wives.

== Geography ==
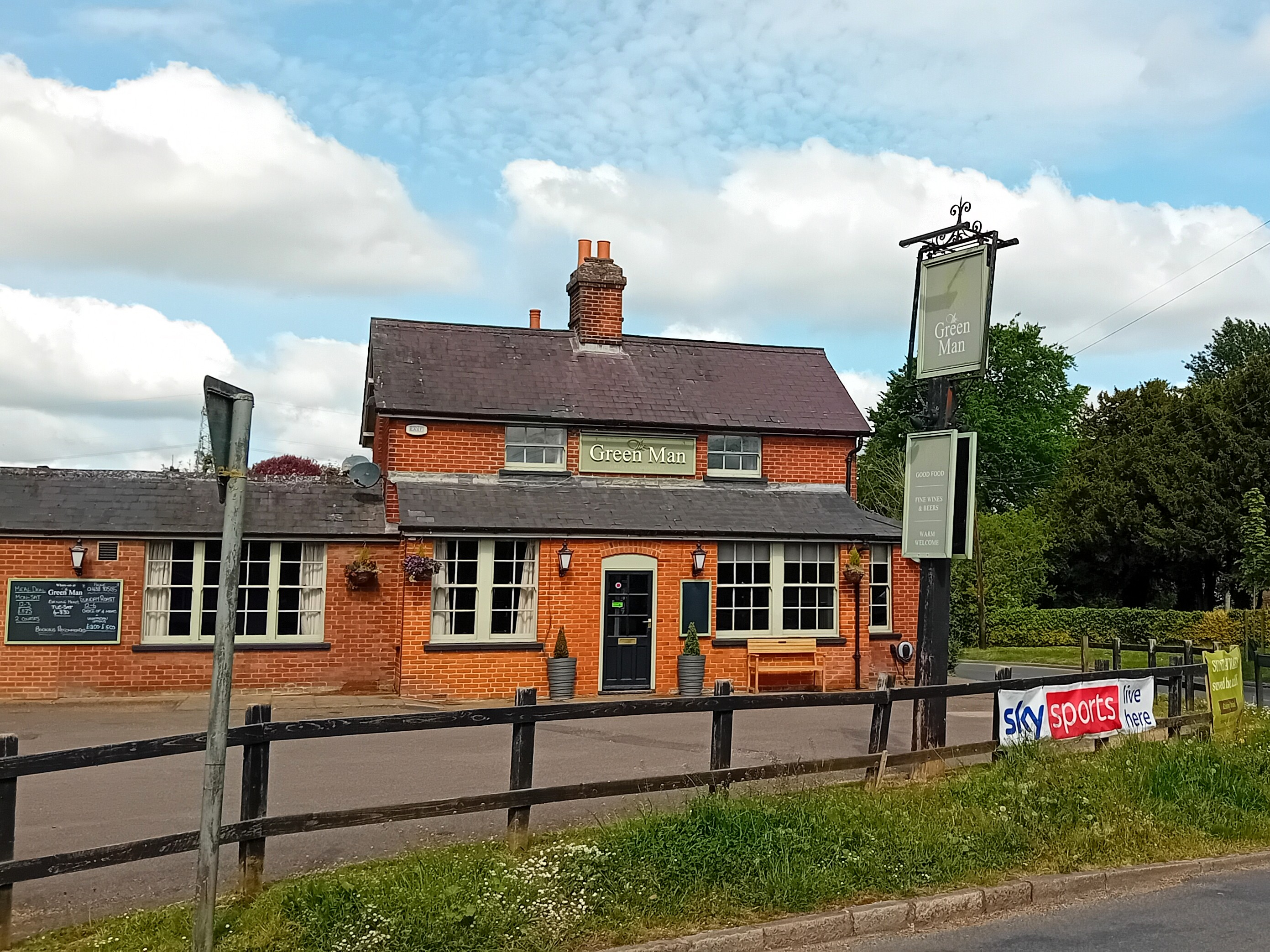
The Green Man public house, Arch Road

The village is set in an agricultural landscape which is protected within the Green Belt. The soil is boulder clay above chalk.

The village has a public house, the Green Man. There is a small village hall which comprises a former tin tabernacle that was originally erected as a church in Hastings, before being dismantled and rebuilt in Great Wymondley as a village hall in 1912.

== Governance ==
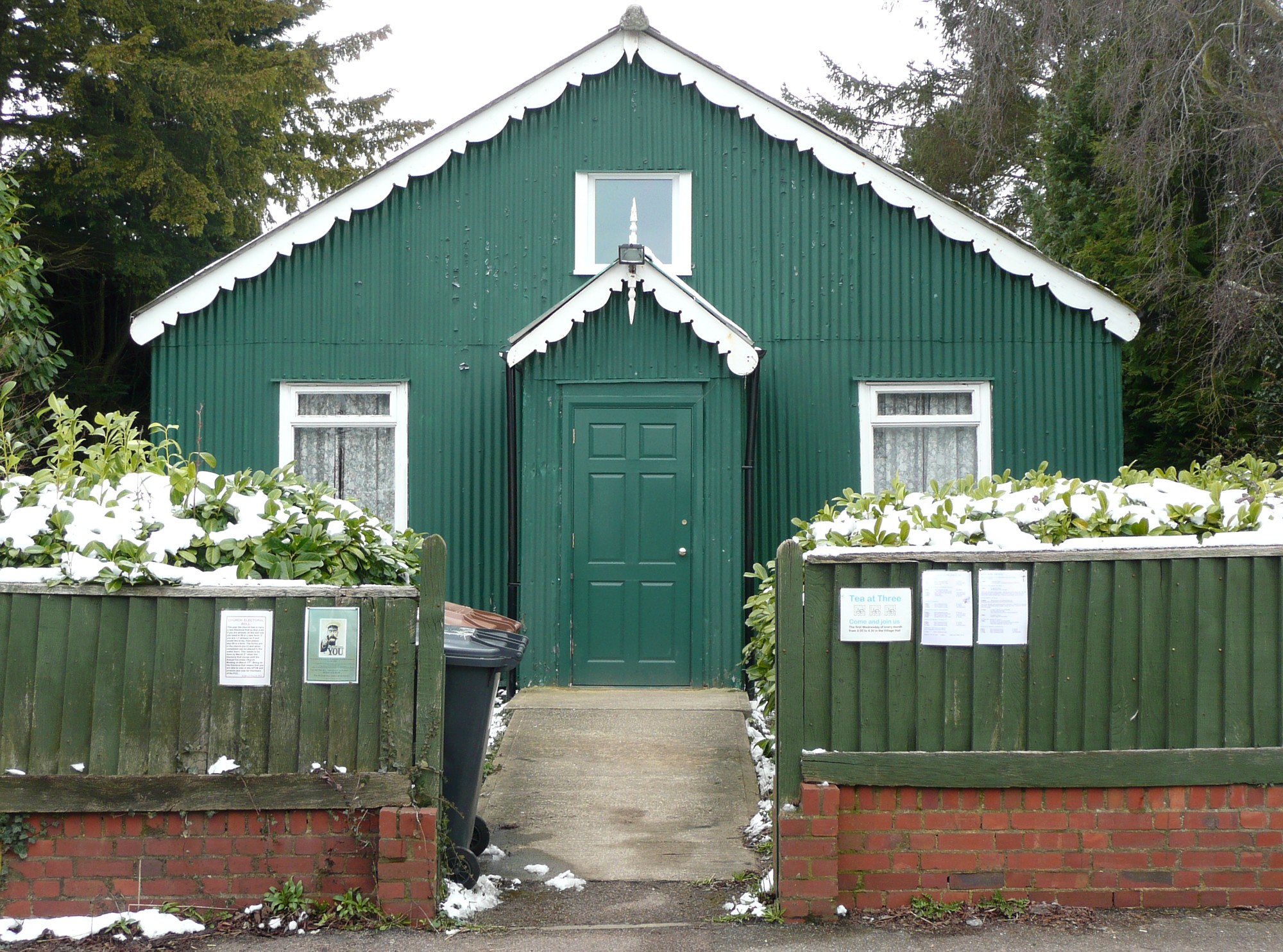
Village Hall

Great Wymondley forms part of the parish of Wymondley. There are three tiers of local government covering Wymondley, at parish, district, and county level: Wymondley Parish Council, North Hertfordshire District Council, and Hertfordshire County Council.

The civil parishes of Great Wymondley and Little Wymondley were merged into a single parish called Wymondley in 1937. In 1931 (the last census before the abolition of the civil parish), Great Wymondley had a population of 285.
