= River Hiz =

River in Hertfordshire, England

Coordinates: 52.01188°N 0.27106°W

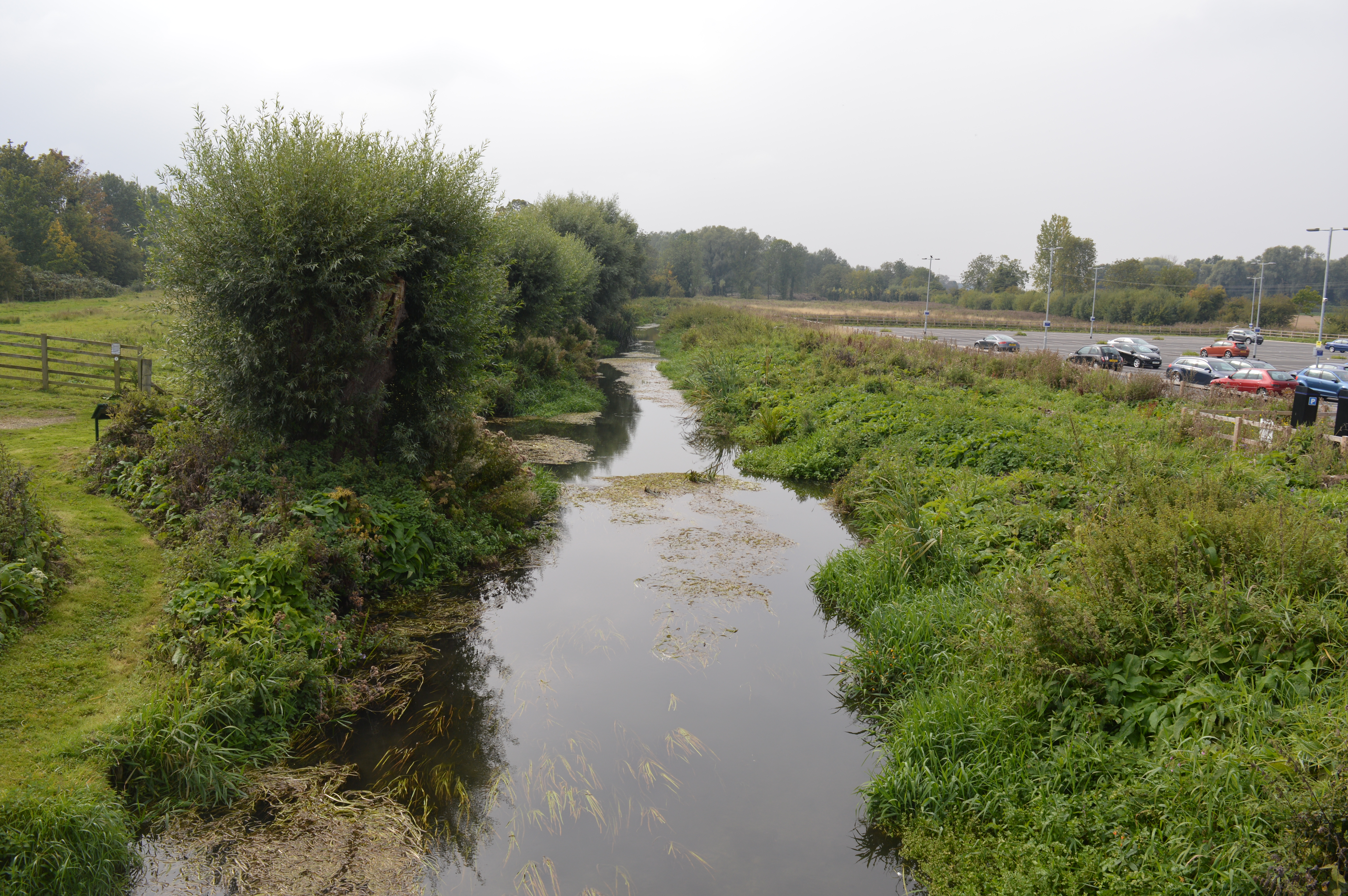
- The river in Arlesey

- Location within the United Kingdom

Location
- Country: England
- Counties: Hertfordshire and Bedfordshire

Physical characteristics
- Source
  - location: South of Charlton at Wellhead
- Mouth: River Ivel
  - location: Near Henlow
- Length: 8.1 miles (13.0 km)

The River Hiz /hɪtʃ/ is a chalk river with a length of 13 km (8.1 mi). Its headwaters rises south of the village of Charlton, the river winds its way through the county of Hertfordshire, moving its way into and through a northeastern direction into Hitchin, to its confluence with the River Purwell, then flows north through its confluence with the River Oughton at Ickleford. The Hiz joins at its confluence of the River Ivel near the village of Henlow.

== Course ==
Its headwaters rises south of the village of Wellhead, Charlton, the river flows through Hertfordshire, meandering through a northeastern direction into Hitchin. The Hiz is a tributary of the Ivel, meaning it joins at its confluence near the village of Henlow. It has a total length of 13 km (8.1 mi).

== Tributaries ==
Two notable tributaries of the Hiz include:

- River Oughton - it joins the Hiz at its confluence at Ickleford.
- River Purwell.

== Hydrology ==
Depth of the River Hiz.
Station	Depth range	Deepest depth (m)	Date of highest level recorded
Arlesey	0.13m-0.26m	1.40 m	27 September 2024

There is one gauging station along the River Hiz, located at Arlesey. This station is regulated by Environment Agency.

=== Hydromorphology ===
Its hydromorphological designation is 'heavily modified' which means it fails to achieve good ecological status due to its physical alterations caused by human use.

== Ecology ==
Species on the River Hiz
Species	Scientific name
Marsh Orchid	Dactylorhiza
Cowslip	Primula veris
Yellow Flag Iris	Iris pseudacorus
Kingfisher	Alcedo atthis
Water Vole	Arvicola amphibius
Trout	Salmo trutta

The table below lists the species of the River Hiz.

== Toponymy ==
The z in Hiz is a Domesday-Book abbreviation for ts (or tch), and Hiz is properly pronounced "Hitch". This fact seems to be little known, and Hiz is now normally said as it is spelled. It may take its name from the Hicce tribe, who inhabited the area and gave their name to Hitchin. Eilert Ekwall says that Hiz/Hitch is a probable back-formation from Hitchin, which in turn is the dative plural of Hicce.

John Norden says the name is derived from a wood called Hitch, but Ekwall believes this is a conflation with Wychwood, for which the Old English is Hwiccawudu.
