= St Ippolyts =

Village in Hertfordshire, England

Coordinates: 51.929°N 0.258°W

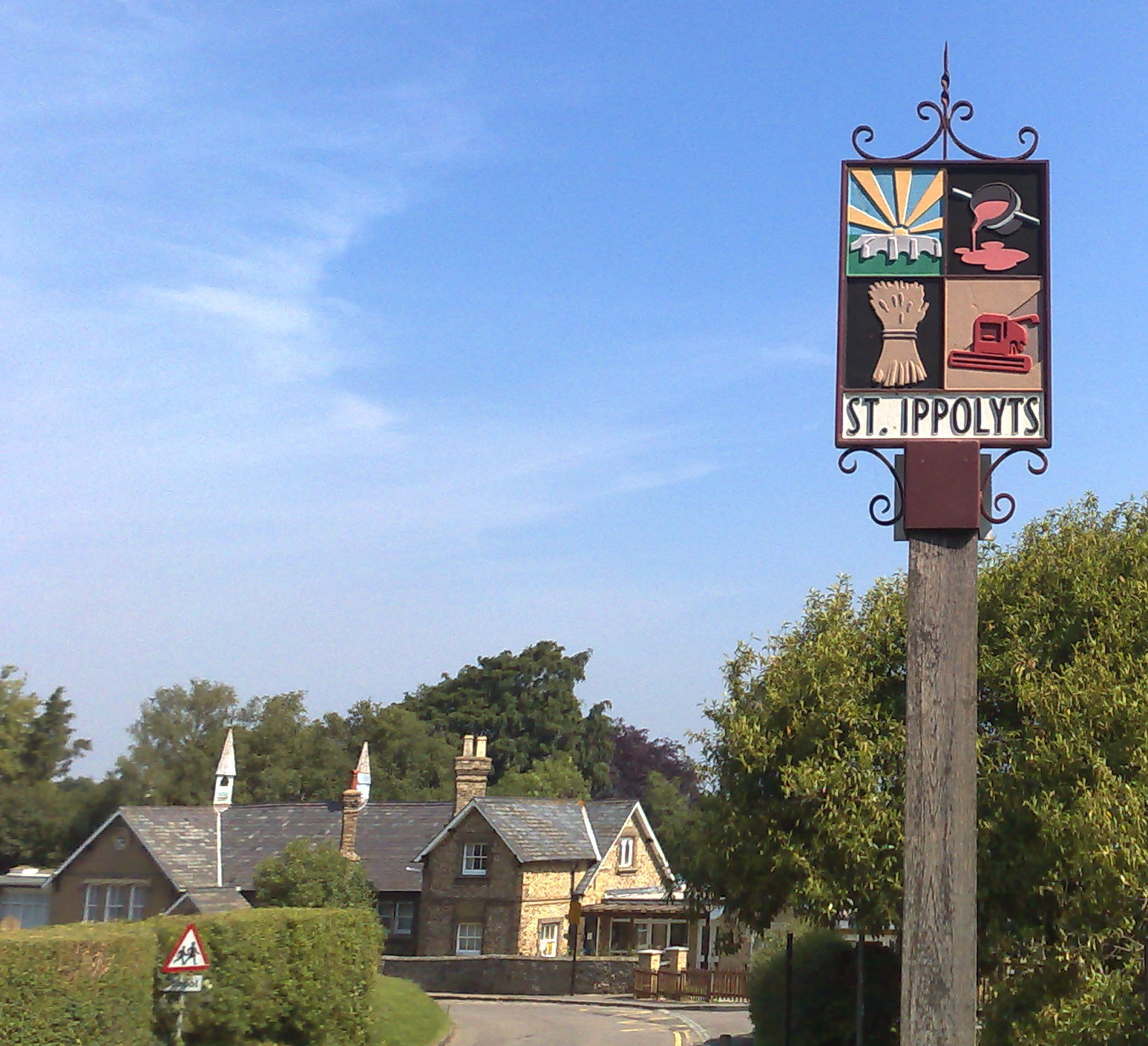
- St Ippolyts village sign

- Location within Hertfordshire
- Population: 2,077 (Parish, 2021)
- OS grid reference: TL197270
- Civil parish: St Ippolyts
- District: North Hertfordshire
- Shire county: Hertfordshire
- Region: East
- Country: England
- Sovereign state: United Kingdom
- Post town: Hitchin
- Postcode district: SG4
- Dialling code: 01462
- Police: Hertfordshire
- Fire: Hertfordshire
- Ambulance: East of England
- UK Parliament: Hitchin

St Ippolyts (historically St Ippollitts) is a village and civil parish on the southern edge of Hitchin in the North Hertfordshire district, in the county of Hertfordshire, England. As well as the village itself, the parish includes the hamlet of Gosmore and southern parts of the Hitchin built up area, alongside rural areas particularly to the south of the village. The parish had a population of 2,076 at the 2021 census.

== Toponymy ==
The name of St Ippolyts, although spelled in a variety of ways, is derived from St Hippolytus to whom the village church was dedicated. Variant spellings which have been recorded include Epolites, Ippolitts, Pallets, Nipples or St Ibbs. (Note: In the same vein, the 1881 census mentions the following 28 place names, all of which are believed to refer to it: Iplits, Ipolits, Ipollitts, Ipollyts, Ipolytes, Ipolyts, Ippatyts, Ipplits, Ipployts, Ipplyts, Ippolett, Ippoletts, Ippolits, Ippolitss, Ippolits, Ippolitss, Ippolitts, Ippollit, Ippollits, Ippollitts, Ippollyts, Ippollytts, Ippololits, Ippolts, Ippolytis, Ippolyts, Ippolytts, Ippoplitts.)

The name of the parish was officially changed from St Ippollitts to St Ippolyts with effect from 2 October 1996. Even in the 21st century, road signs to the village on consecutive junctions on the nearby A602 show contradictory spellings of the village name.

== History ==
St Ippolyts historically formed part of the ancient parish of Hitchin. A church dedicated to St Hippolytus was built around 1087 as a chapel of ease for the southern part of Hitchin parish, and subsequently gave its name to the small village around it. St Ippolyts became a separate parish from Hitchin in the middle ages.

Some features of the village are a 17th-century gabled house, a timber-framed house formerly known as the Olive Branch Inn, and a 16th-century house built around an even older timbered house.

=== St Ippolyts Church ===
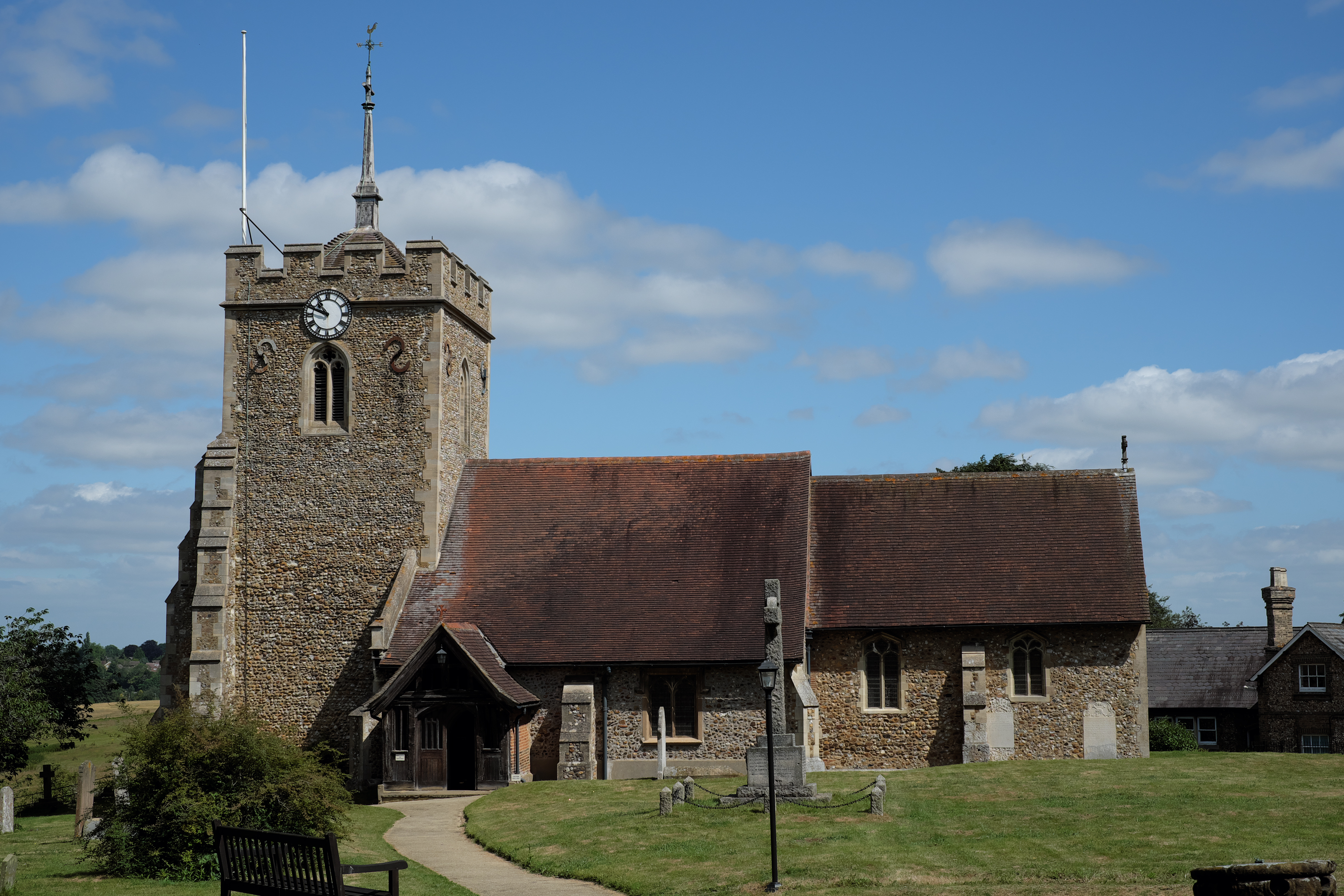
St Ippolyts Church

The church was built in 1087 in a hilltop position. According to the church records, the building was funded by grants supplied by Judith de Lens, the niece of William the Conqueror. De Lens gave evidence against her husband Waltheof, a Saxon Earl, which led to his execution. The funding of the church was an attempt to make amends for this act. The church was rebuilt in the mid-19th century using old materials 'recycled' from the nearby abandoned Minsden Chapel. Apart from St Ippolyts, the church also serves the nearby villages of Gosmore and Langley.

The noted theologian Fenton John Anthony Hort (Fenton Hort) is amongst the former vicars of St Ippolyts church where he stayed for 15 years before taking up a fellowship and lectureship at Emmanuel College in Cambridge.

Politician George Lloyd, 1st Baron Lloyd (1879–1941) was buried in the churchyard, as is Geoffrey Lane, Baron Lane (1918-2005), former Lord Chief Justice of England.

== Geography ==
St Ippolyts is located in between the A602 (Stevenage Road) and the B656 (Codicote Road), 2 km (1.2 mi) south-east of Hitchin, Hertfordshire. It lies approximately 80 m (260 ft) above sea level in a gap in the Chiltern Hills.

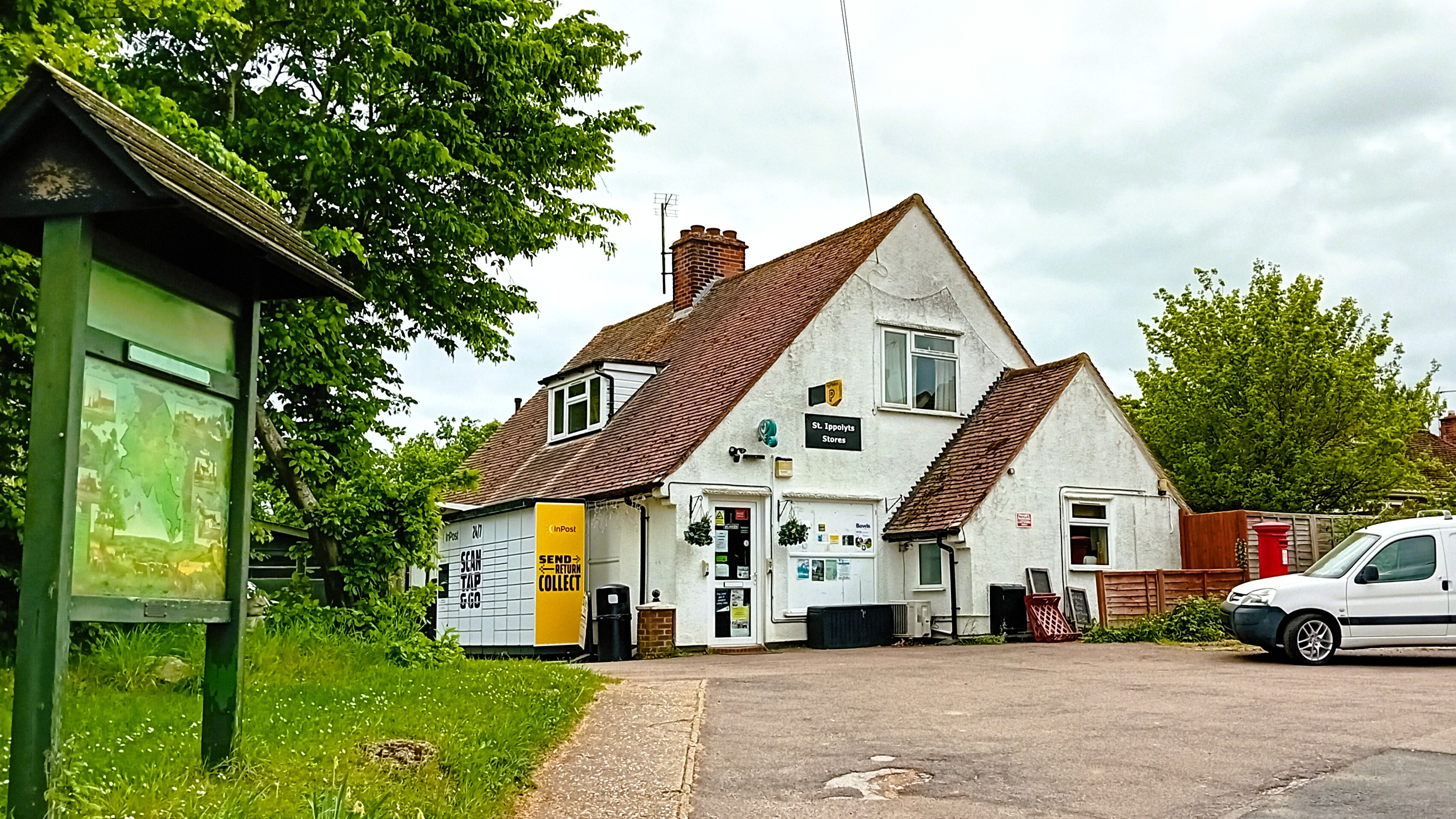
Village shop, Waterdell Lane

The parish includes the village of St Ippolyts and the adjoining hamlet of Gosmore, and also includes southern parts of the Hitchin built up area. There is a village shop at Waterdell Lane. Wymondley grid substation is in the parish, south of the A602, but takes its name from the neighbouring parish of Wymondley. The substation covers 78 acres, and eventually cost £7.5m, built by Howard Farrow Construction.

=== Almshoe ===
The ancient manor of Almshoe, mentioned in the Domesday Book, is located in the south of the parish. Almshoe Bury—now a farmhouse and wedding venue—is a grade I listed building.

== Governance ==
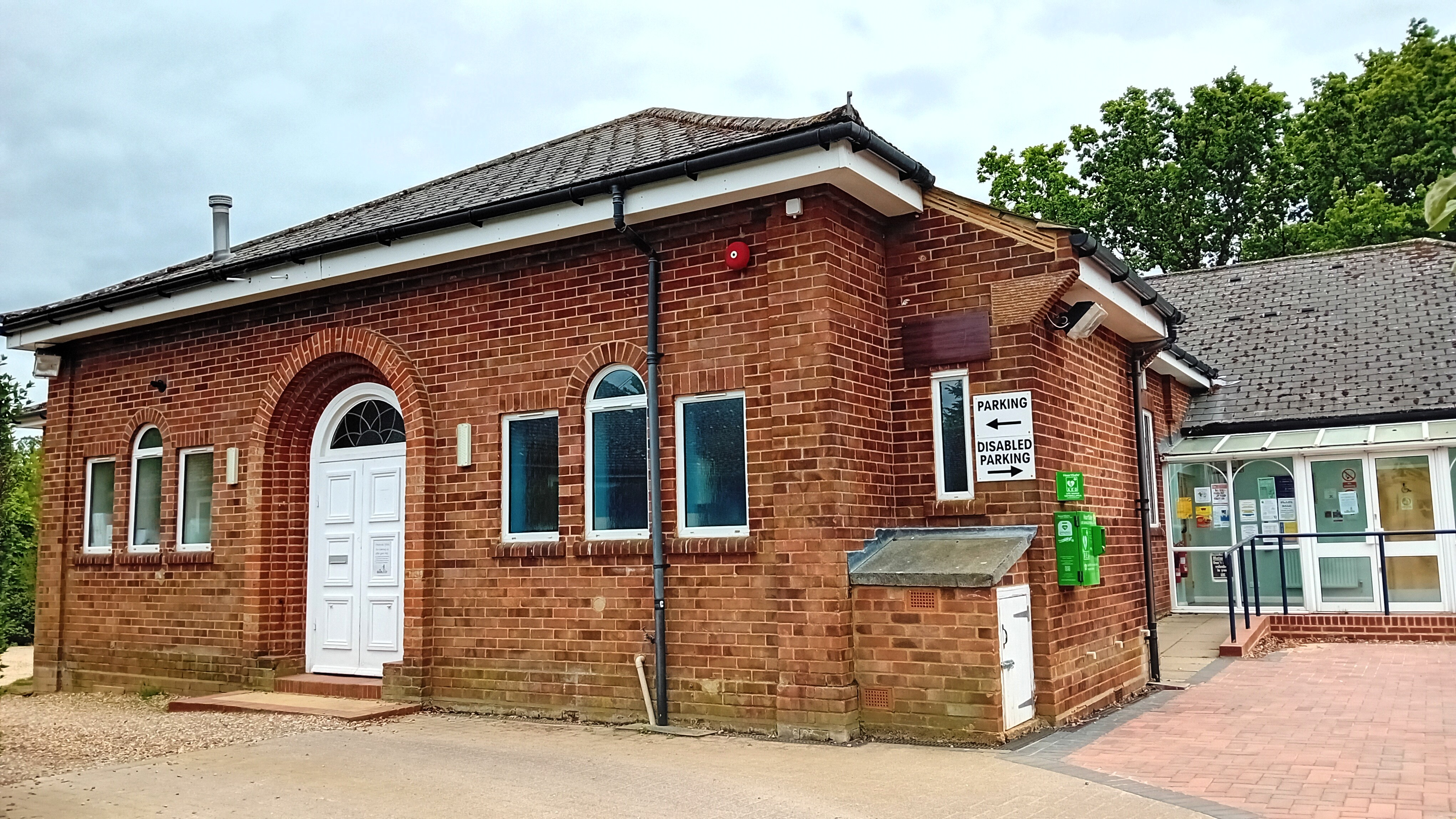
St Ippolyts Parish Hall, Waterdell Lane

There are three tiers of local government covering St Ippolyts, at civil parish, district and county level: St Ippolyts Parish Council, North Hertfordshire District Council, and Hertfordshire County Council. The parish council meets at the Parish Hall on Waterdell Lane.

For national elections, the parish forms part of the Hitchin constituency.

== Nearby towns and villages ==
- Gosmore
- Great Wymondley
- Hitchin
- Kings Walden
- Little Wymondley
- Preston
- Stevenage
