= Purwell Ninesprings =

Nature reserve in Hertfordshire, England

Coordinates: 51.9491°N 0.24666°W

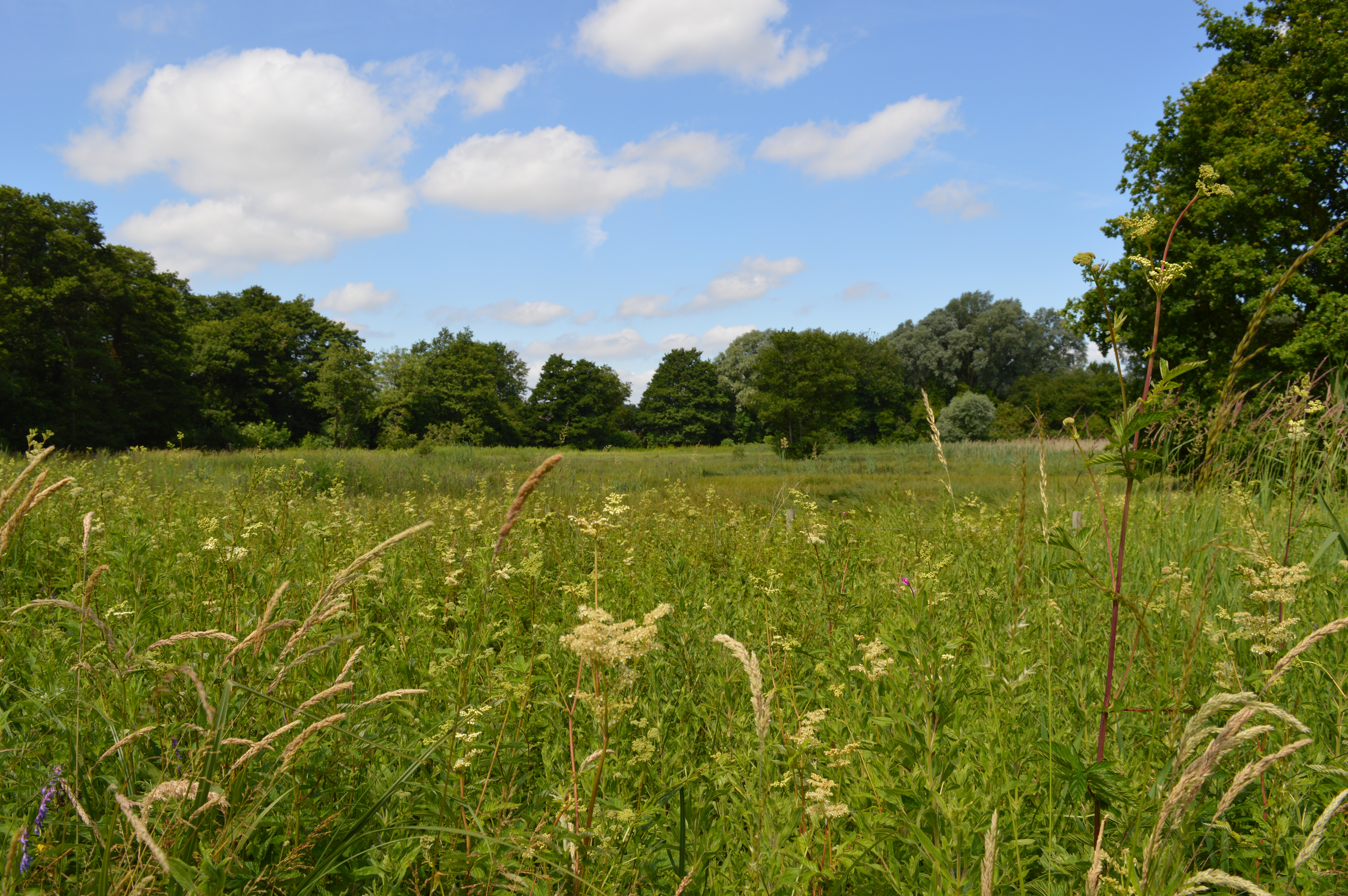

Purwell Ninesprings is a 6.4-hectare (16-acre) nature reserve managed by the Herts and Middlesex Wildlife Trust on the edge of Hitchin, Hertfordshire, England.

The reserve is in the flood-plain of the River Purwell. It has open water with water voles and birds such as moorhens, mallards and teals. Other birds include snipe and siskins. The wet ground has plants such as tussock sedge, yellow iris and water forget-me-nots.

== Access ==
There is access from Gypsy Lane, a track which runs from the junction of Purwell Lane and Kingswood Avenue through to Hitchin Road. This route is promoted as part of the Hitchin Outer Orbital Path.
