= Little Wymondley =

Village in Hertfordshire, England

Coordinates: 51.93217°N 0.23387°W

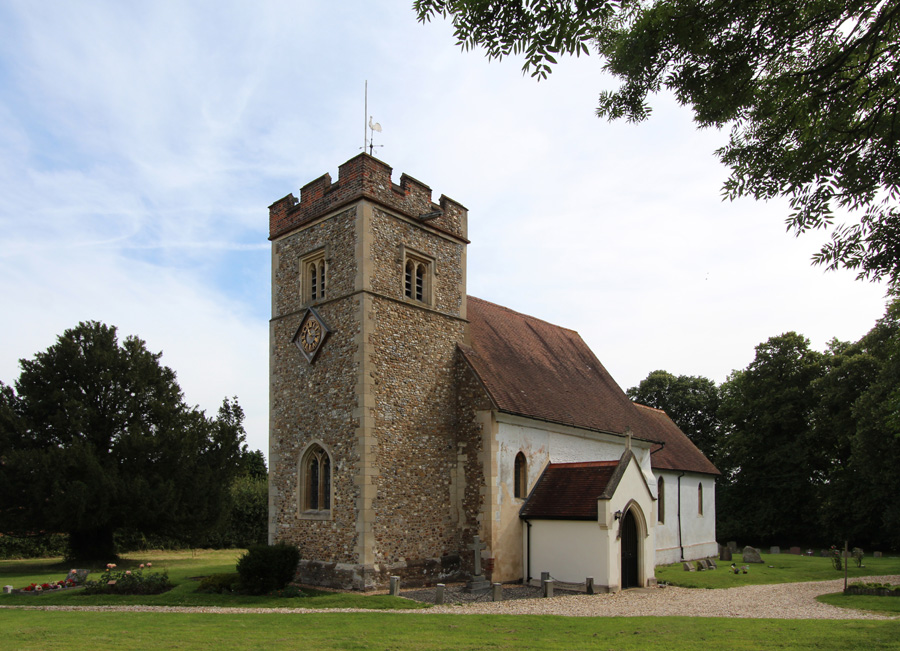
- St Mary's Church, Little Wymondley

- Location within Hertfordshire
- Population: 1,002 (Built up area, 2022 estimate)
- OS grid reference: TL216274
- Civil parish: Wymondley
- District: North Hertfordshire
- Shire county: Hertfordshire
- Region: East
- Country: England
- Sovereign state: United Kingdom
- Post town: Hitchin
- Postcode district: SG4
- Dialling code: 01438
- Police: Hertfordshire
- Fire: Hertfordshire
- Ambulance: East of England
- UK Parliament: Hitchin

Little Wymondley is a village in the parish of Wymondley, in the North Hertfordshire district of Hertfordshire, England. It lies 2 miles (3 km) south-east of Hitchin, its post town, and a similar distance north-west of Stevenage. The built-up area of Little Wymondley had an estimated population of 1,002 in 2022. Despite the names, Little Wymondley is now larger than its neighbour Great Wymondley.

== History ==
The Domesday Book of 1086 records 58 households at Wymondley, with the land being divided between four owners. It does not distinguish between Little Wymondley and Great Wymondley, but later historians have deduced that the lands Robert Gernon and Odo of Bayeux correspond to Little Wymondley, whilst the lands of Gosbert of Beauvais and those held directly by King William were Great Wymondley.

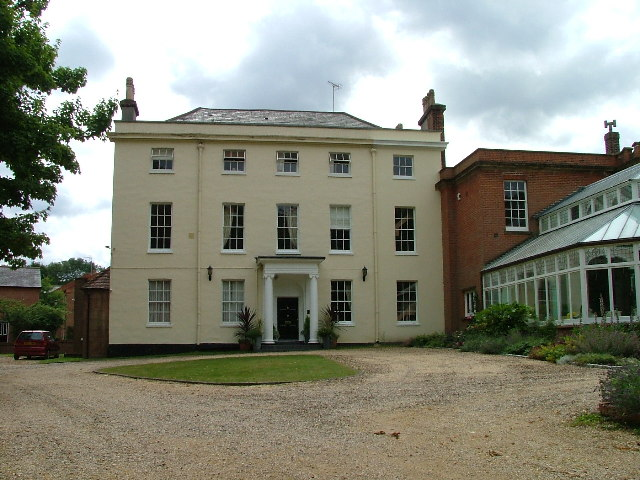
Wymondley House

Wymondley was anciently part of the parish of Hitchin. There was a church at Great Wymondley by the 12th century, which was originally a chapel of ease to St Mary's Church, Hitchin. The church at Great Wymondley had its own clergy by the early 13th century and Great Wymondley was thereafter treated as a separate parish, although it retained some ties to Hitchin until the Reformation in the 16th century. Around the same time that Great Wymondley became a parish, a church was also built at Little Wymondley, which had become a separate parish by 1235. The boundary between the two parishes of Great Wymondley and Little Wymondley was complex, as was often the case with parishes created at this time out of a previously united territory. Both parishes had detached parcels of land in the area around Titmore Green and Todds Green at the southern end of the old Wymondley territory.

The Church of St Mary the Virgin, Little Wymondley, is a Grade II* listed building.

Little Wymondley has several interesting houses, including the moated Bury of the 16th and 17th centuries, the fine 17th-century Hall, the late Georgian Wymondley House, and Wymondley Priory, an early 13th-century foundation turned into a house in the 16th and 17th centuries.

From 1799 until 1832/33, Wymondley House at Little Wymondley was the location of a dissenting academy for the education of future nonconformist ministers. The academy went under various names, including Wymondley College.

== Services ==
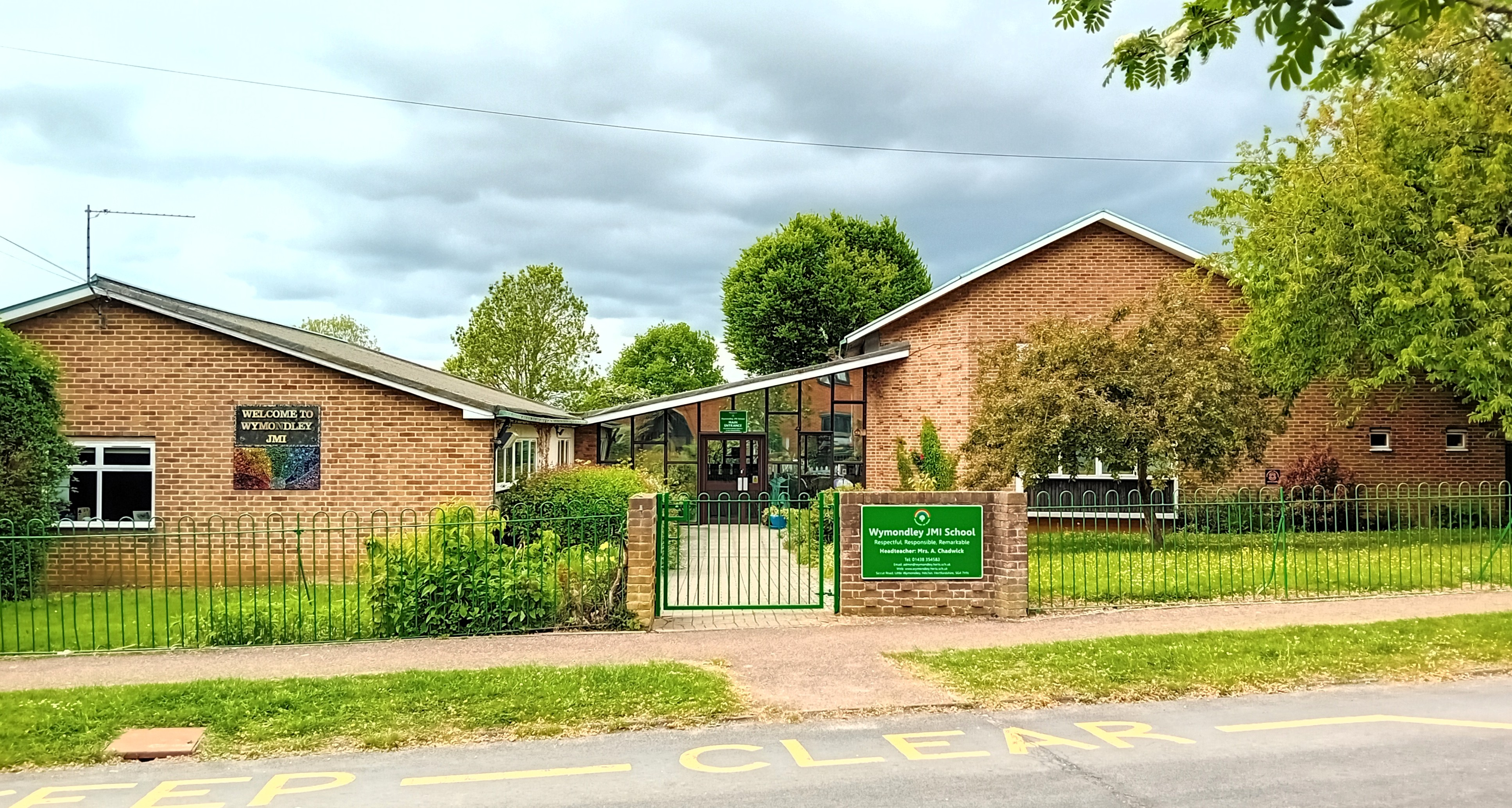
Wymondley JMI School, Siccut Road

The village has a primary school, Wymondley JMI School, which serves both Little Wymondley and neighbouring Great Wymondley.

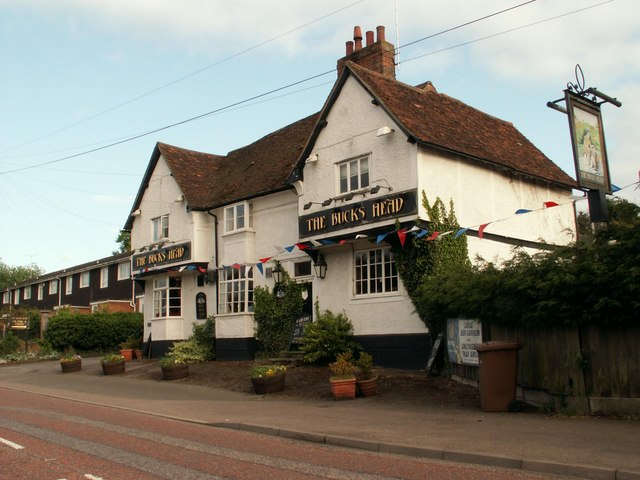
The Bucks Head

There are two public houses, both on Stevenage Road, being the Plume of Feathers and the Bucks Head. The Buck's Head is now closed and no longer functions as a public house.

== Governance ==
Little Wymondley forms part of the parish of Wymondley. There are three tiers of local government covering Wymondley, at parish, district, and county level: Wymondley Parish Council, North Hertfordshire District Council, and Hertfordshire County Council.

The civil parishes of Little Wymondley and Great Wymondley were merged into a single parish called Wymondley in 1937. In 1931 (the last census before the abolition of the civil parish), Little Wymondley had a population of 445.
