= River Purwell =

River in Hertfordshire, England

Coordinates: 51°57′35″N 0°16′03″W

River Purwell Ippollitts Brook
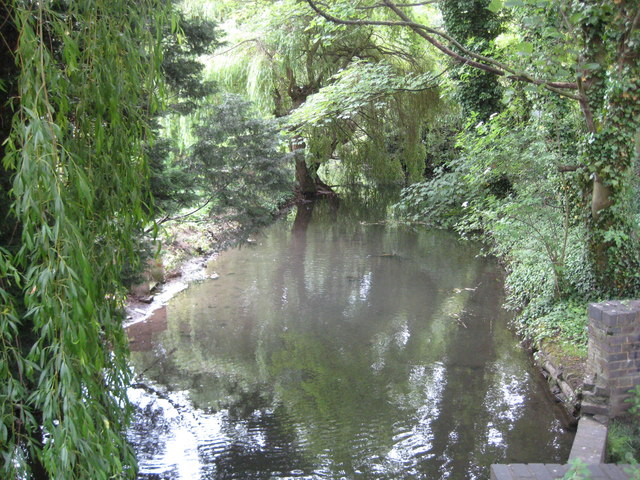
- River Purwell at is confluence with the River Hiz

Location
- Country: England
- Counties: Hertfordshire
- Unitary Authority: North Hertfordshire District Council
- Settlements: Hitchin, St Ippolyts

Physical characteristics
- Source: St Ippolyts
  - location: St Ippolyts, Hertfordshire,England.
- Mouth: River Hiz
- Length: 5.766 km (3.583 mi)

The River Purwell is a chalk stream in Hertfordshire, England. It is a continuation of the Ippollitts Brook where its source is found at St Ippollitts and the Purwell's source is between on the border of Great Wymondley and Hitchin, where it joins the Hiz at its confluence downstream at Walsworth. The river powered a watermill until the 1920s.

== Course ==
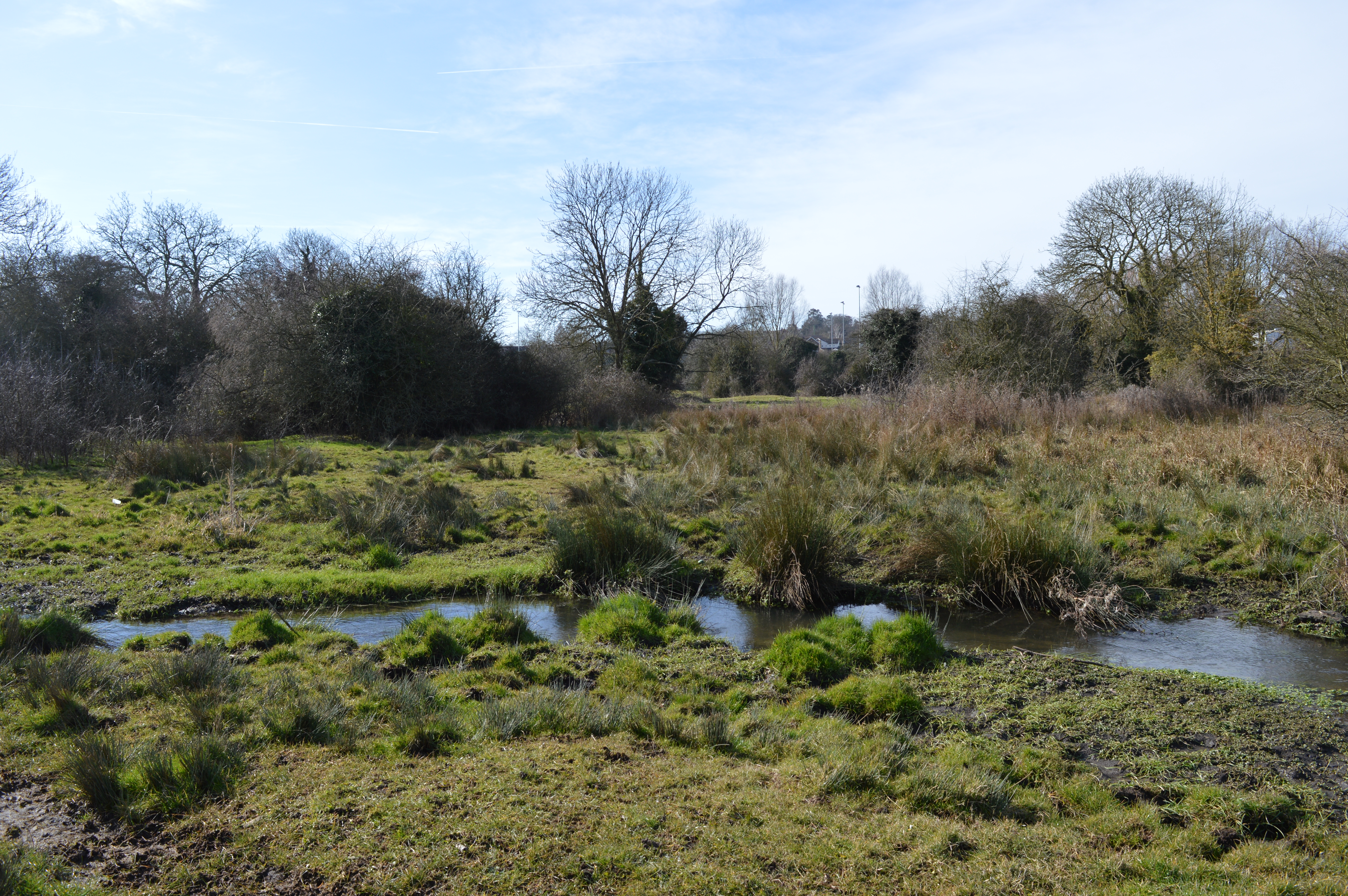
River Purwell in Purwell Meadows

The River Purwell is a continuation of Ippollitts Brook. Ippollitts Brook's source is found at St Ippollitts flowing through the A602 and Oakfield Farm, where its course flows predominantly south of Hitchin, the tributary of Ash Brook joins the Ippollitts Brook. By the time it reaches the border between Great Wymondley and Hitchin, Ippollitts Brook becomes the River Purwell. The actual point of the changes in the name are unclear; maps show it could be shortly before the stream crosses before from the south of Hitchin to the east of Hitchin, or on the border between Great Wymondley and Hitchin.

The River Purwell flows through Purwell Mill and traverses through the A505 before joining the River Hiz downstream at Walsworth. The Environment Agency gave the river a length of 5.766 km (3.583 mi) and a catchment area of 51.734 km^{2} (19.975 sq mi).

The river and associated wetlands are protected by nature reserves at Ninesprings and Purwell Meadows.

== Water quality ==
The Environment Agency measures the water quality of the river systems in England. Each is given an overall ecological status, which may be one of five levels: high, good, moderate, poor and bad. There are several components that are used to determine this, including biological status, which looks at the quantity and varieties of invertebrates, angiosperms and fish. Chemical status, which compares the concentrations of various chemicals against known safe concentrations, is rated good or fail.

The water quality of the River Purwell was as follows in 2022.

Water body	Water body type	Ecological status	Hydromorphological Designation	Catchment area	Length
River Purwell	River	Moderate	Heavily modified	51.734 km^{2} (19.975 sq mi)	5.766 km (3.583 mi)

== Hydrology ==
The River Purwell through Walsworth Common has been artificially widened and straightened for flood control purposes. The degraded habitat, predominantly fine sediment, disconnected the river from its flood plain. A flood risk remains in some areas which are a designated flood zone.

== History ==
At Purwell Meadows the river powered a watermill until the 1920s. The existing building is a couple of hundred years old, but a mill at this site is mentioned in the Domesday Book. This document from 1086 recorded a mill worth 20s in the part of Great Wymondley belonging to King William. Because part of the mill extended over the river to the opposite bank, in Hitchin manor, the Manor of Great Wymondley had to pay an annual fee of 6d.
