= Frederic Seebohm (historian) =

British economic historian (1833 - 1912)

- Born: Frederic Arthur Seebohm; 23 November 1833; Bradford, West Riding of Yorkshire, England
- Died: 6 February 1912 (aged 78); Hitchin, Hertfordshire, England
- Occupation: Economic historian
- Writing career
- Notable works: The English Village Community Examined in its Relations to the Manorial and Tribal Systems and to the Common or Open Field System of Husbandry

Frederic Arthur Seebohm (23 November 1833 – 6 February 1912) was a British economic historian. He is notable for his emphasis on continuity between the Roman and Anglo-Saxon periods.

== Life ==
Seebohm was born in Bradford, West Yorkshire. He was the second son of Benjamin Seebohm (1798–1871) and Esther Wheeler (1798-1864). Benjamin Seebohm was a wool merchant at Horton Grange, Bradford, the family having moved to England from Waldeck-Pyrmont in Germany. Frederic was the great-grandson of philanthropist and Quaker William Tuke, and the younger brother of steel manufacturer and ornithologist Henry Seebohm (1832-1895). Frederic was educated at Bootham School (a Quaker school in York).

He became a barrister in the Middle Temple in London in 1856. The following year he married Mary Ann Exton. Seebohm and his wife set up their home in Hitchin, Hertfordshire.

Though he was a well-respected legal mind, it was as a social and economic historian that Seebohm truly made his mark. Notably, his seminal work English Village Community (published in 1883) placed him in the foremost rank of economic historians. Before this work, the prevailing view held that primitive Anglo-Saxon society consisted of communal groups of freemen holding land in common ("the Mark"). However, due to continual aggression from native and foreign leaders, the village community was held to have degenerated over time into a more hierarchical social structure ("the Manor"), in which the tenants, originally free, became serfs. However, Seebohm's analysis demonstrated that there was no satisfactory ground for believing that the free community ever existed in England.

In his cogent alternative analysis, Seebohm emphasised similarities between the Roman villa and the manor, the implication being that the medieval manor can be explained as an amalgamation of the Roman villa with the Germanic tribal system.

He received the honorary degree Doctor of Letters (D.Litt.) from the University of Cambridge in May 1902.

== Descendants ==
Seebohm and his wife had six children (a son, Hugh, and five daughters). In 1891, their daughter Juliet married renowned surgeon Sir Rickman Godlee, himself a Quaker and the son of a Middle Temple barrister. Seebohm was the grandfather of Frederic Seebohm, Baron Seebohm (1909–1990), the soldier, banker, and innovator of social work. He was also the great-grandfather of the biographer and broadcaster Victoria Glendinning.

== Partial bibliography ==
- (1865) The Crisis of Emancipation in America
- (1867) Oxford Reformers: John Colet, Erasmus, and Thomas More
- (1871) On International Reform
- (1874) Era of the Protestant Revolution
- (1883) The English Village Community Examined in its Relations to the Manorial and Tribal Systems and to the Common or Open Field System of Husbandry
- (1895) The Tribal System in Wales
- (1902) Tribal Custom in Anglo-Saxon Law
- (1914, posthumous) Customary Acres and their Historical Importance
