= Newnham, Hertfordshire =

Coordinates: 52°01′18″N 0°11′11″W

Newnham
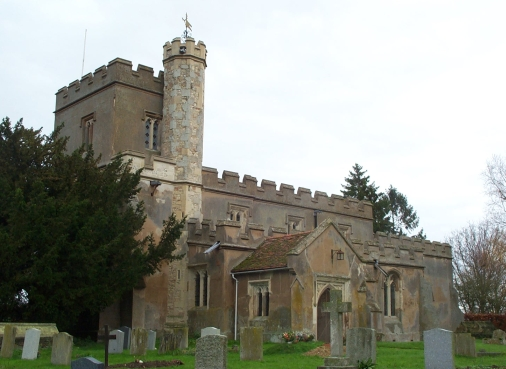
- Church of St Vincent

- Location within Hertfordshire
- Population: 88 (Parish, 2021)
- Civil parish: Newnham
- District: North Hertfordshire
- Shire county: Hertfordshire
- Region: East
- Country: England
- Sovereign state: United Kingdom
- Post town: Baldock
- Postcode district: SG7

Newnham is a small village and civil parish in the North Hertfordshire district of Hertfordshire, England. It lies 2 miles (3 km) north of the town of Baldock. It shares a grouped parish council with the neighbouring parish of Caldecote. At the 2021 census the parish had a population of 88.

== History ==
St Vincent's Church dates back to the 12th century, and features several medieval wall murals.

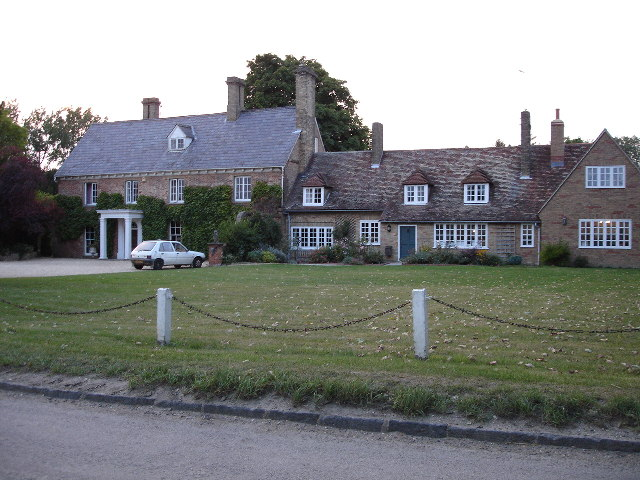
Newnham Hall

The solicitor and historian Reginald Hine (1883-1949) was born in Newnham Hall.

== Governance ==
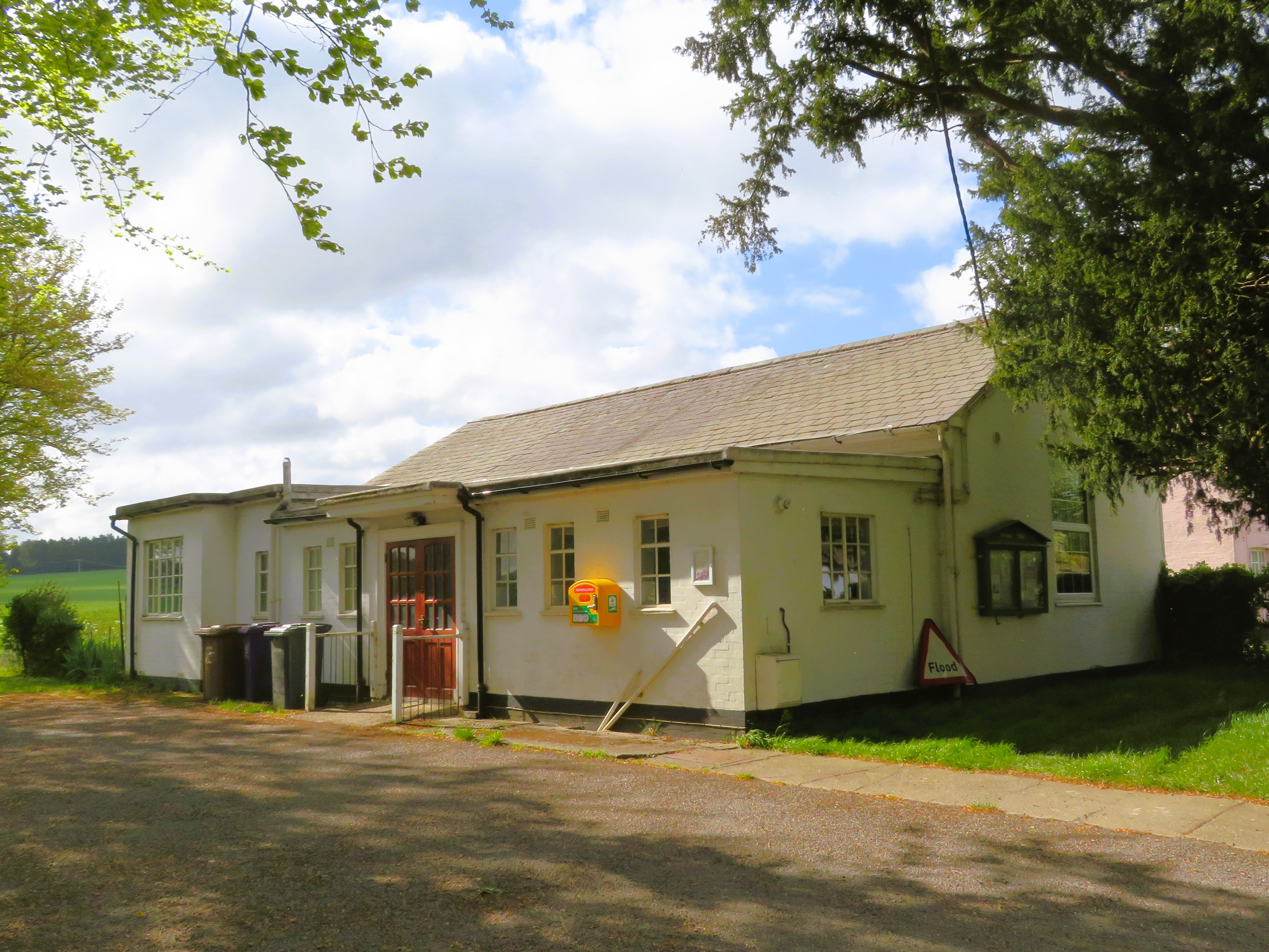
Newnham Village Hall

There are three tiers of local government covering Newnham, at parish, district, and county level: Caldecote and Newnham Parish Council, North Hertfordshire District Council, and Hertfordshire County Council. The parish council is a grouped parish council, also covering the neighbouring parish of Caldecote.

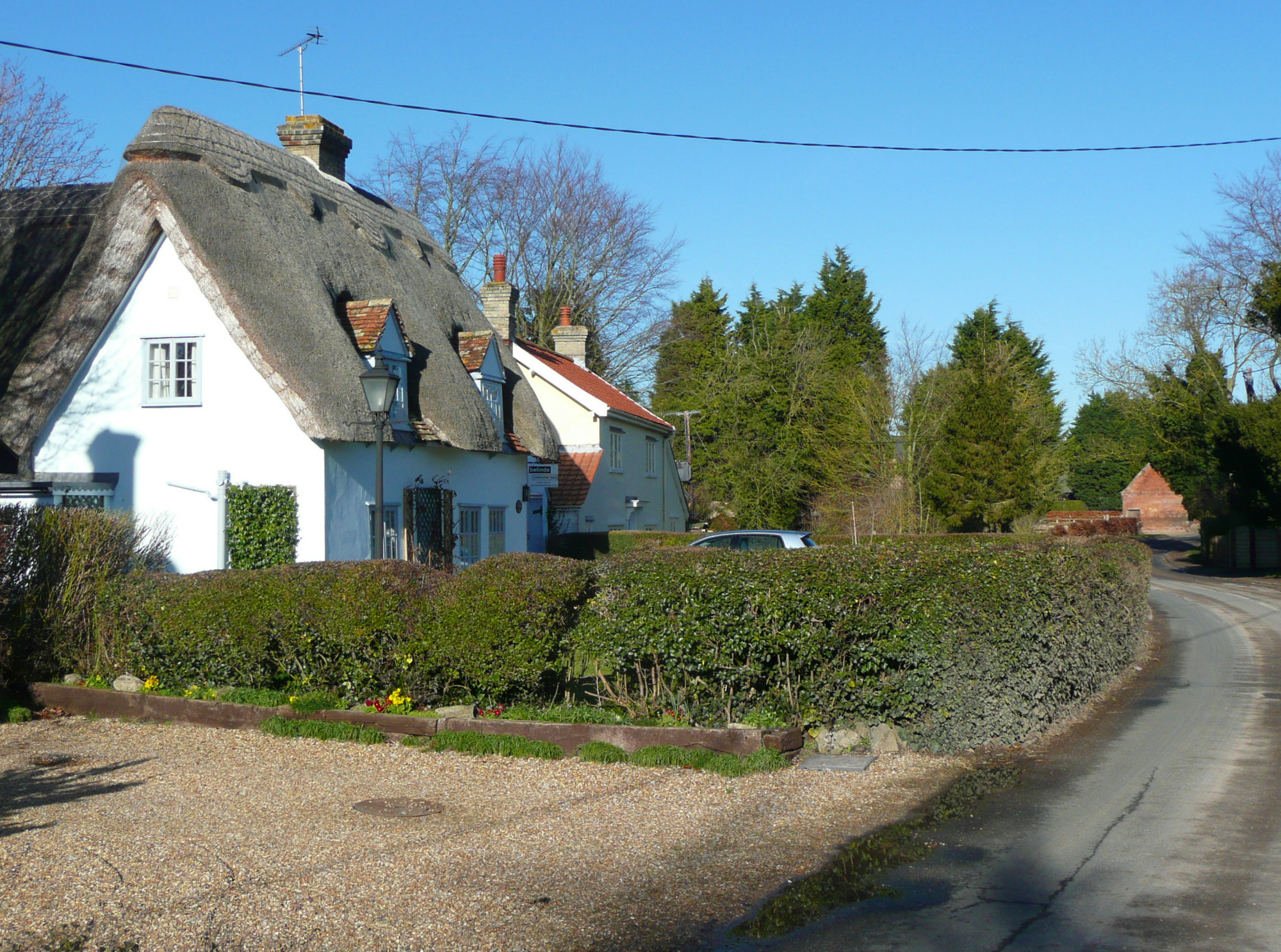
Cottages on Ashwell Road

== Sources ==
- British History Online: Newnham
- Vision of Britain: Newnham
- Vision of Britain: Newnham statistics
