= Church of St Vincent, Newnham =

Church in Hertfordshire, England

Coordinates: 52.0232°N 0.1894°W

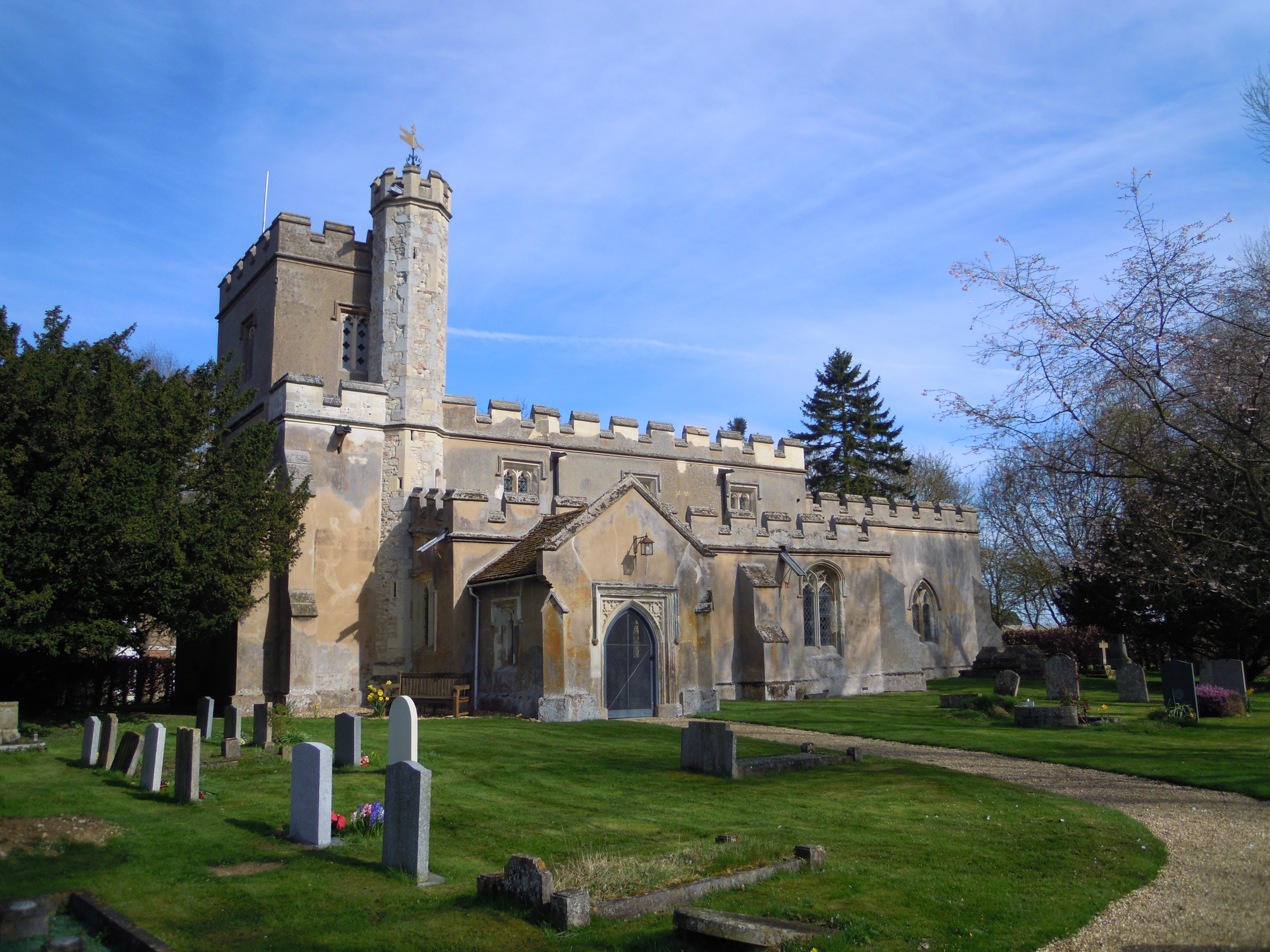
Church of St Vincent in Newnham

The Church of St Vincent in Newnham in Hertfordshire is a 12th-century Anglican parish church and a Grade II* listed building, having gained that status in 1968. The church is named for Saint Vincent and is under the Diocese of St Albans; it is noted for the Newnham Murals which were uncovered in 1963.

== History and design ==
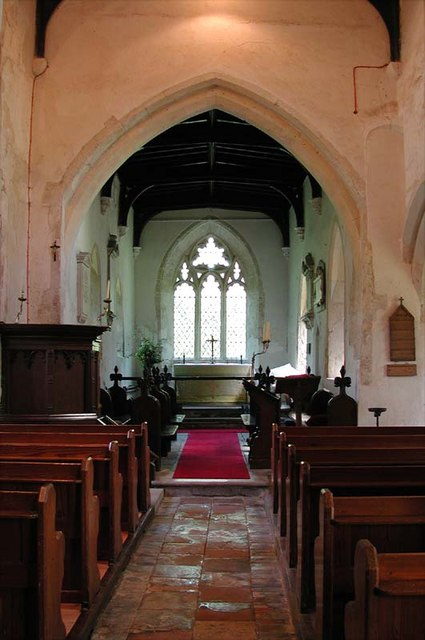
Looking East towards the chancel

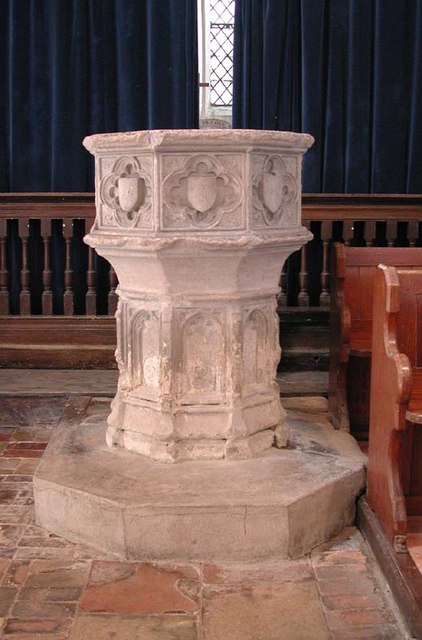
The 15th-century baptismal font

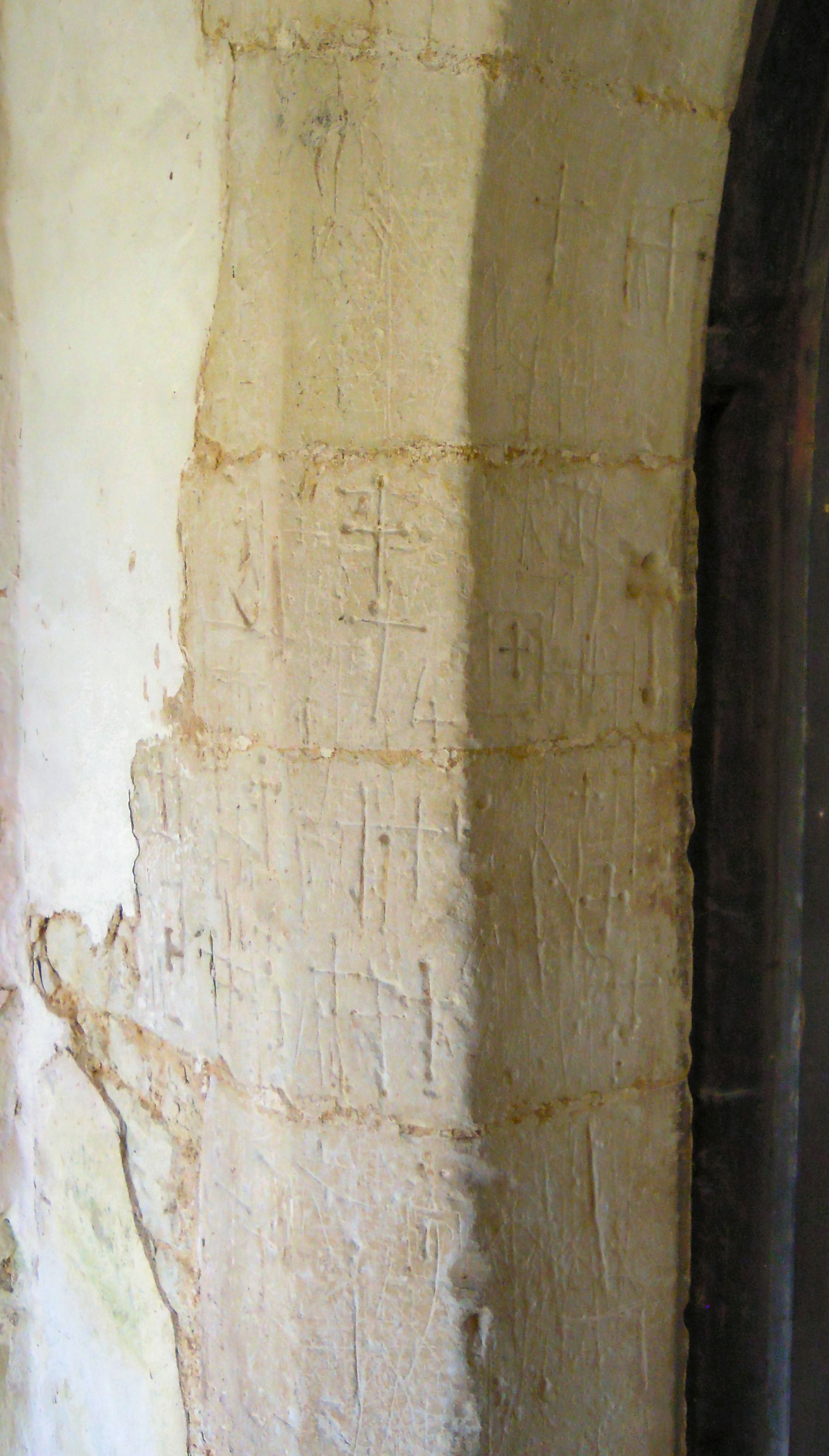
Votive crosses carved into the stonework of the porch

St Vincent's church was consecrated by Herbert de Losinga, Bishop of Norwich, and is built of clunch rubble masonry with dressed stones visible on the stair turret. The outer walls were rendered in Roman cement during the Victorian period with scribed lines intended to imitate ashlar. The chancel is 31 ft. 3 in. by 12 ft. 7 in., the nave 48 ft. 3 in. by 15 ft. 9 in., its west end is cut off at 7 ft. 7 in. from the west by an arch carrying the east wall of a small west tower, and a south aisle with porch. The nave has three bays, and some of the nave walling in the church is possibly 12th-century, while the chancel was rebuilt or lengthened in the early 13th century. The South aisle and West tower date to about 1340 or earlier. From 1420 to 1440 repairs and additions to the church were made by John of Wheathampstead, Abbot of St Albans, probably including the octagonal baptismal font, the East window, the clerestory windows, the stair turret and the South porch. There are fragments of 15th-century glass in the West window of the South aisle and in the South clerestory. The church was renovated in 1881.

Because clunch is so soft its use in the construction of the church has encouraged graffiti, in particular around the main entrance and in the south porch; however, due to weathering some of these have now faded. Especially noteworthy are the votive crosses inscribed by Mediaeval pilgrims and other travellers who visited the church on their journeys, possibly to the Abbey at St Albans, and which are still visible on the outside of the door arch. Clearer examples of a fish and a windmill can be seen around the doorway to the belfry turret.

In the chancel can be found two monumental brasses, one to Joan Dowman of 1607, having a large figure with the figures of one son and seven daughters below, each with a name attached. The other slab is of the early 16th-century and has the figures of a man and his two wives, beneath the second wife being one son and three daughters, while the brasses of the first wife's children have been lost. On the walls and floor are memorials dating from the 17th and 18th-centuries. An embroidery of St Vincent originally kept in his home by the solicitor and historian Reginald Hine (who was born in Newnham Hall) is now on display in his memory in St Vincent's church.

The church has only one bell in the tower, though there are "pits" for four. This single bell originally belonged to a group of three, the other two being in nearby churches at Clothall and Norton, and all are believed to have been cast by the same person, probably a local craftsman at the end of the 16th century. Local tradition suggests that the two bells from St Vincent's were sold to these churches many years ago.

== The Newnham Murals ==
It was the custom in the Middle Ages to decorate the interior of churches with Bible Stories, single figures of Saints, Moralities and decorative designs. During the English Reformation in the 16th-century such pictorial representations gave offence and were either destroyed or whitewashed over, often with Biblical texts painted over them.

Remains of wall paintings were discovered on the North wall in 1963; these are believed to be 14th- and 15th-century in date (some may be as early as the 13th century). There is evidence that this wall was decorated along its whole length. Directly opposite the entrance is the best preserved of the murals which shows the lower half of St Christopher including his feet, the bottom of his staff, some cliffs and fish darting in a stream. On the right (East) side the banks of the stream can be seen, and on the left is the faint image of the hermit standing in his cell with his lantern to guide the Saint. This painting is late 15th-century in date and the muted colours include red, yellow, grey and black, with a hint of vermilion. Other features include what appears to be a mermaid and part of a pillar, and these may belong to an earlier 14th-century mural. The upper half of the Saint carrying the infant Christ was accidentally destroyed during the reconstruction of the nave roof in 1881. To its right is a fragment showing a wheel design with figures of mysterious creatures, while to the East of the eastern nave window a hooded human figure can be seen on the window edge close to the pulpit. This latter section may have been part of a Doom Painting, portraying the Last Judgement. A consecration cross of unusual design is visible on the South East face of the stair turret.

== Gallery ==
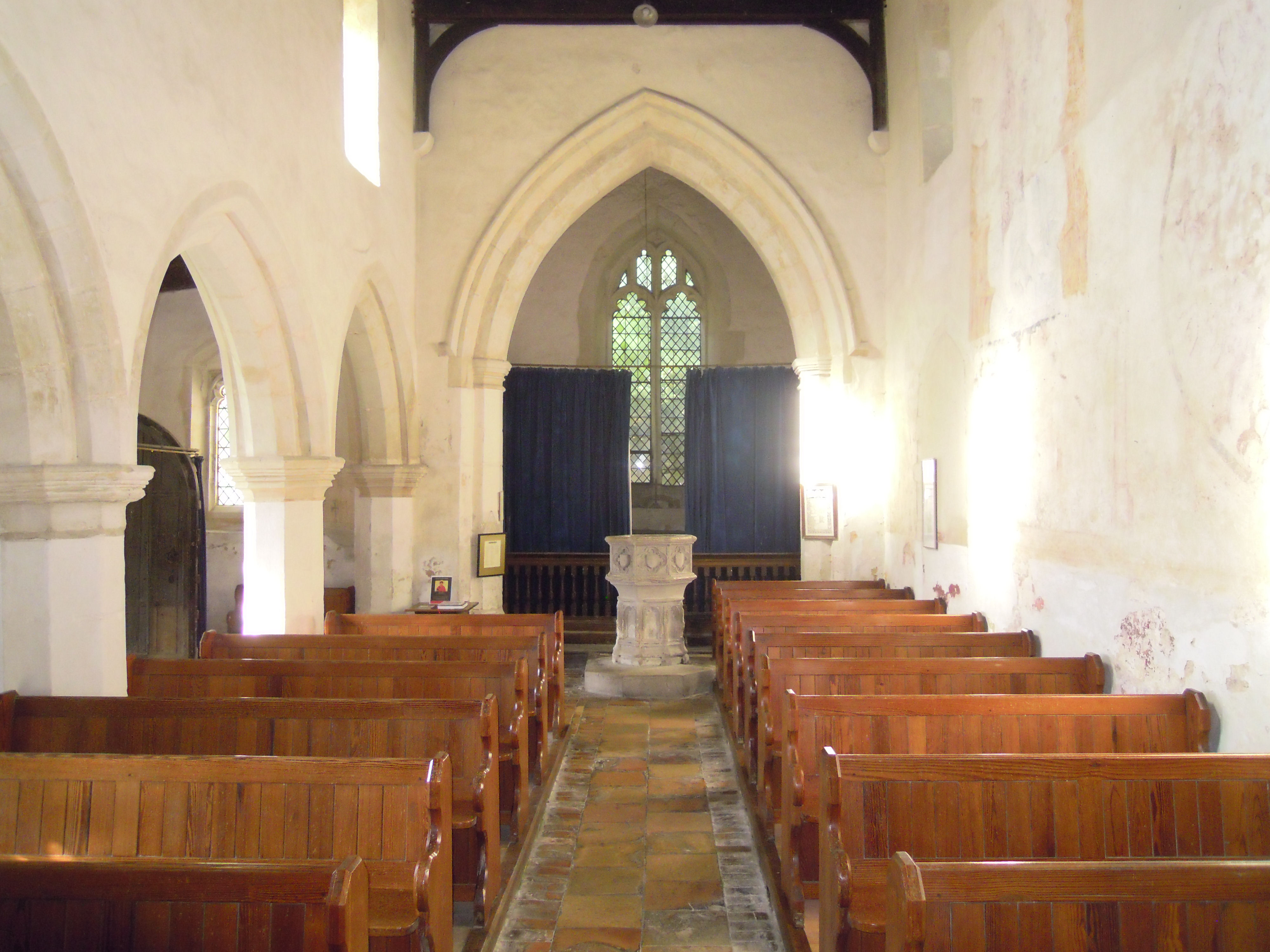
Looking West in Newnham Church

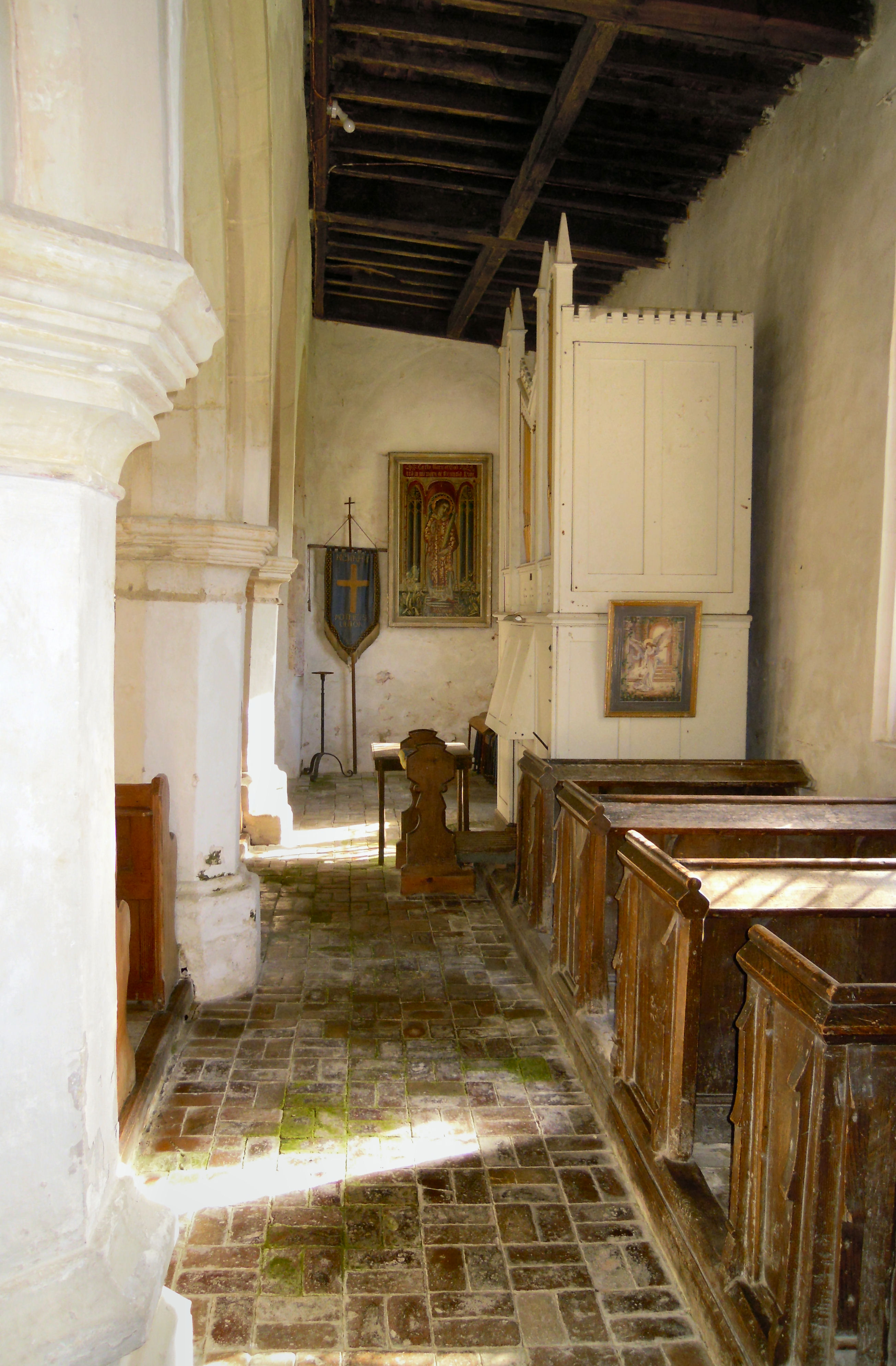
View of the South Aisle

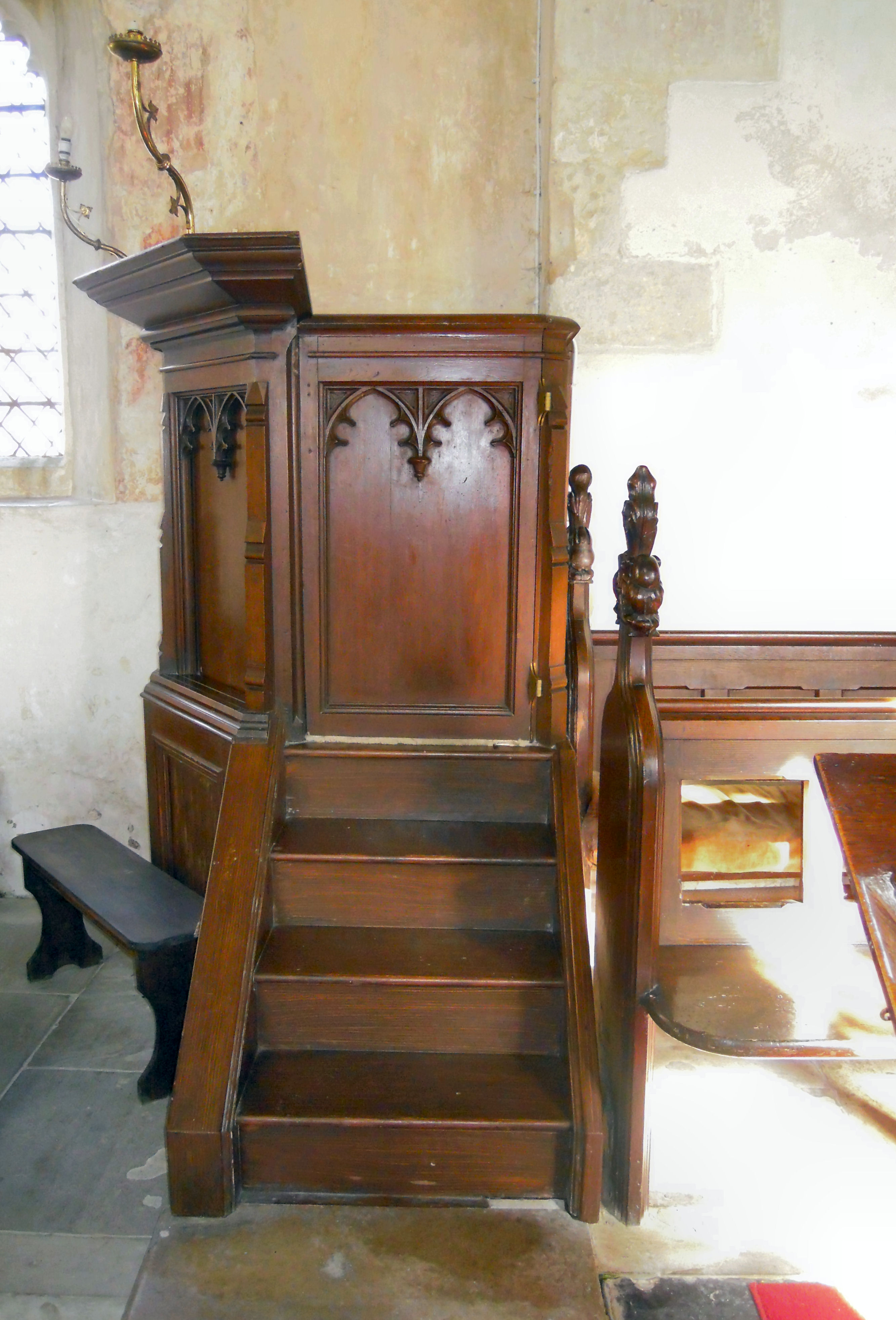
The pulpit

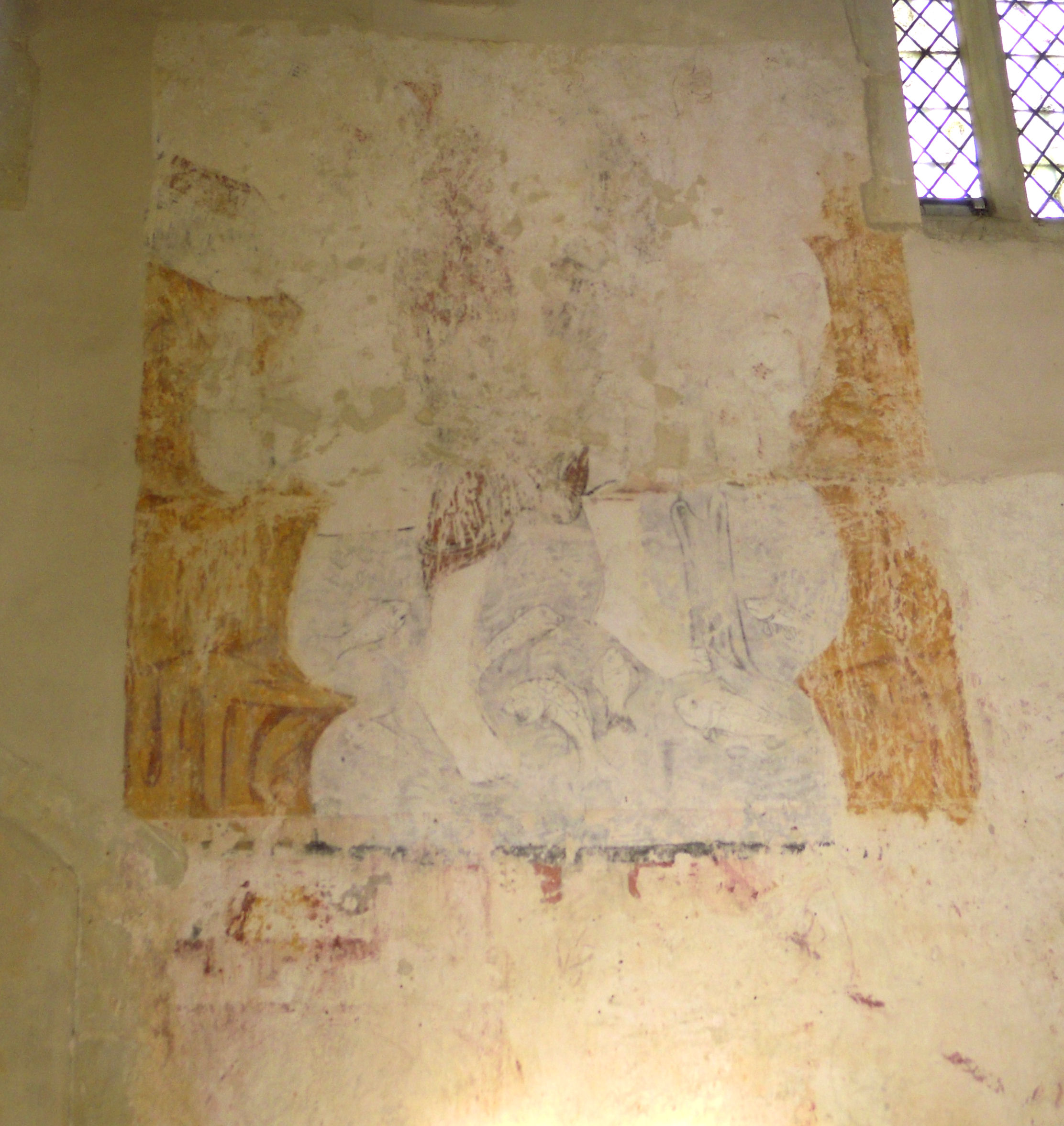
Fragment of a Mural of Saint Christopher

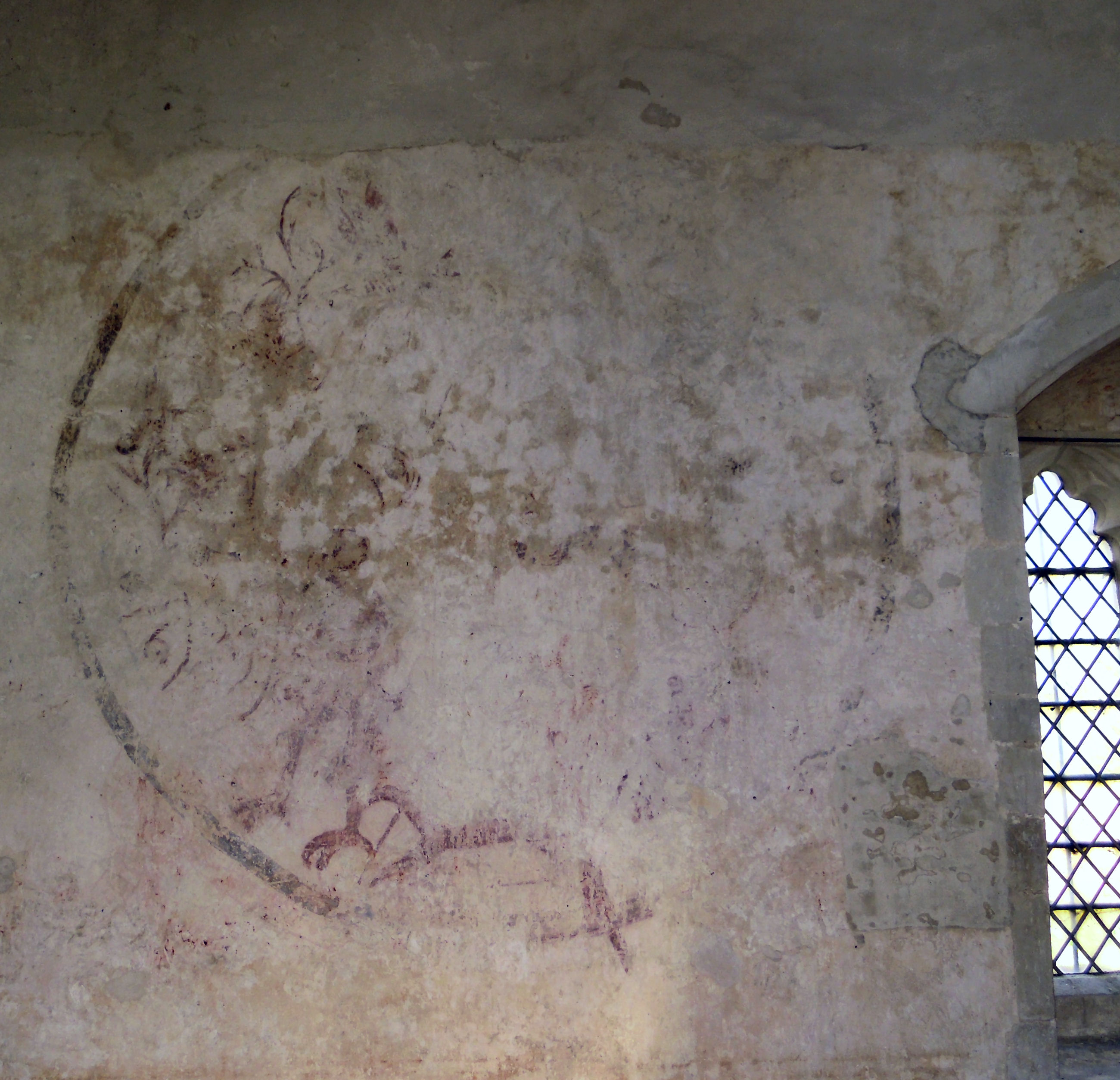
The Wheel Mural

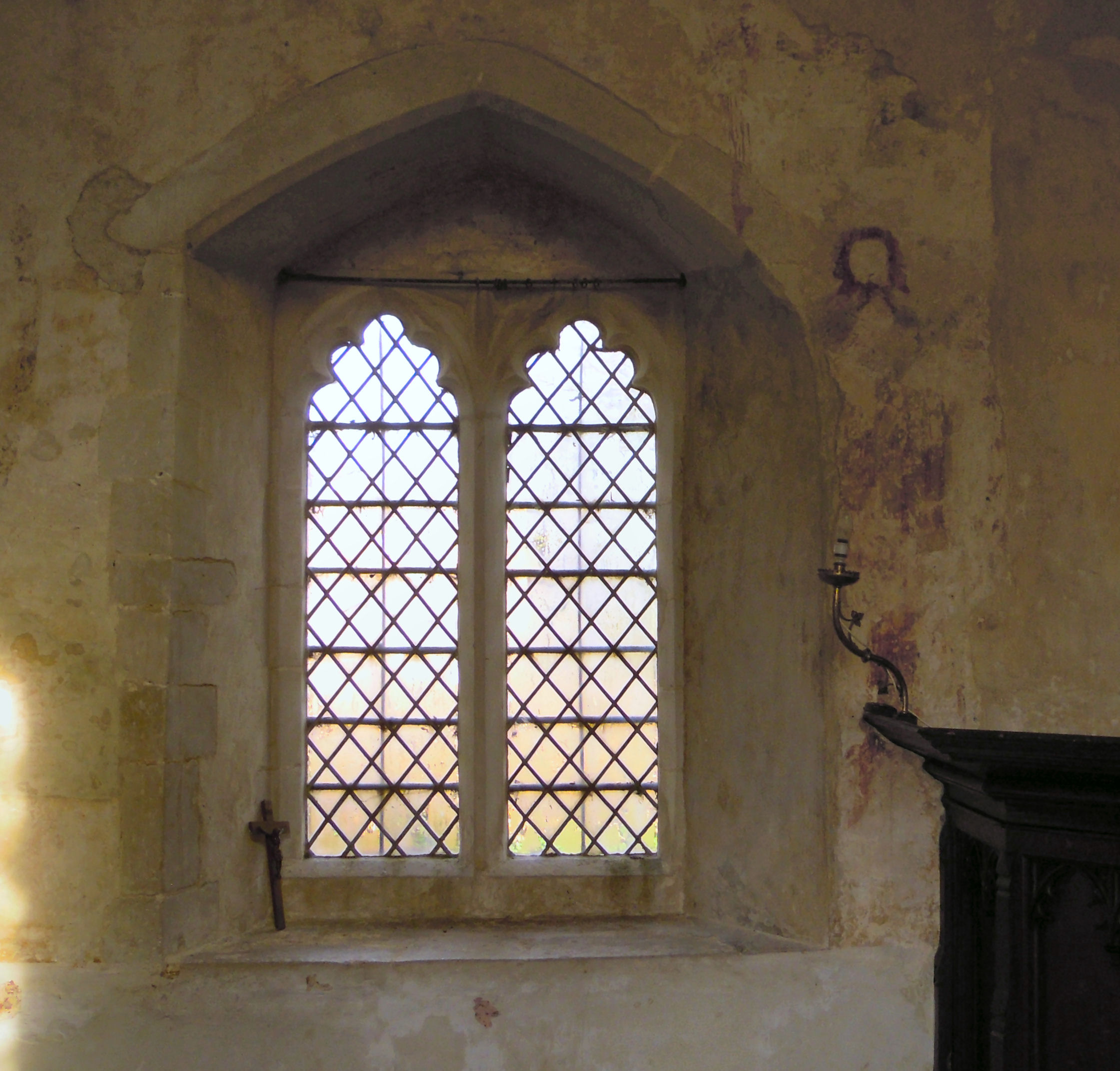
Fragment of a Doom Painting of the Last Judgement

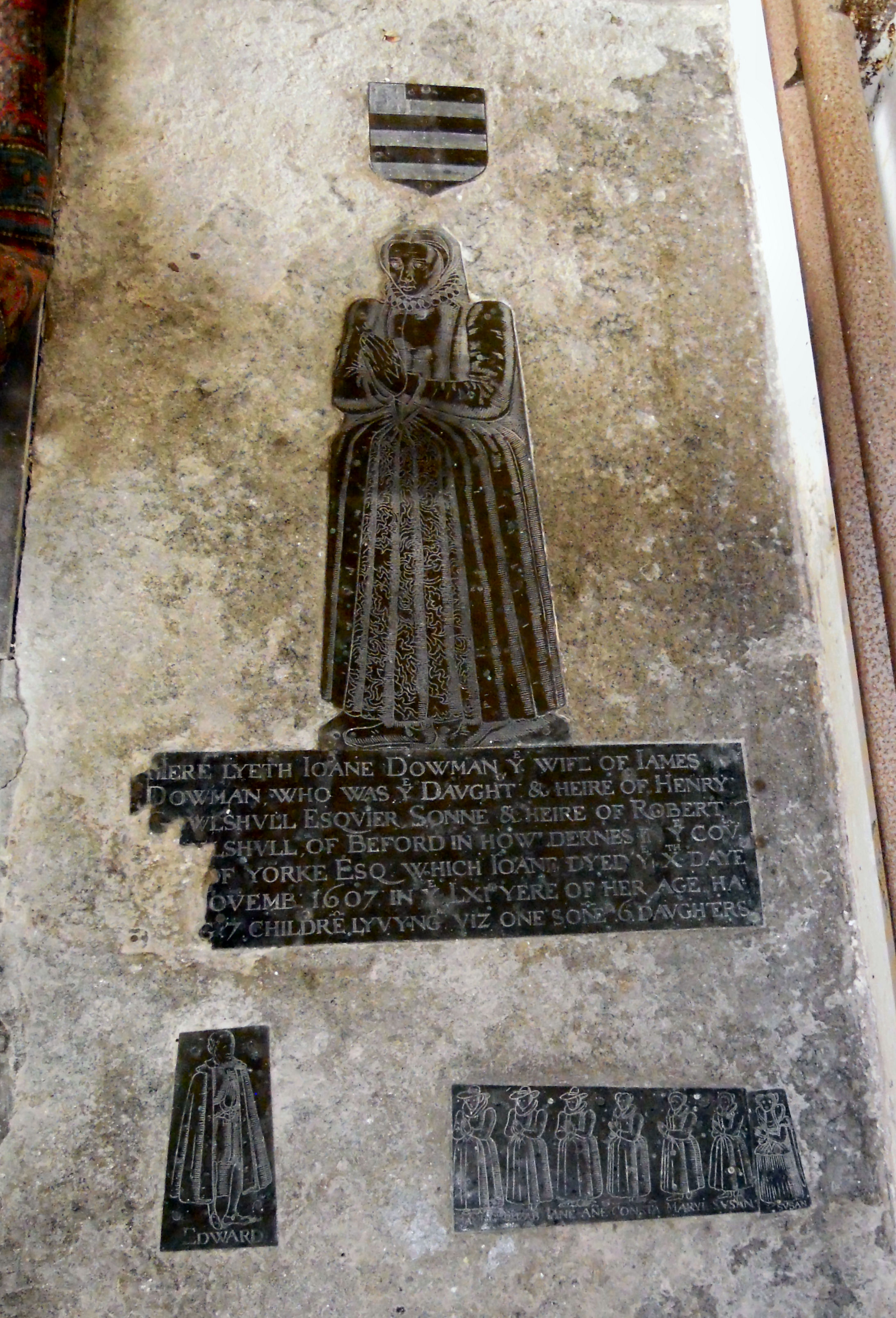
Monumental brass of Joan Dowman (1607)

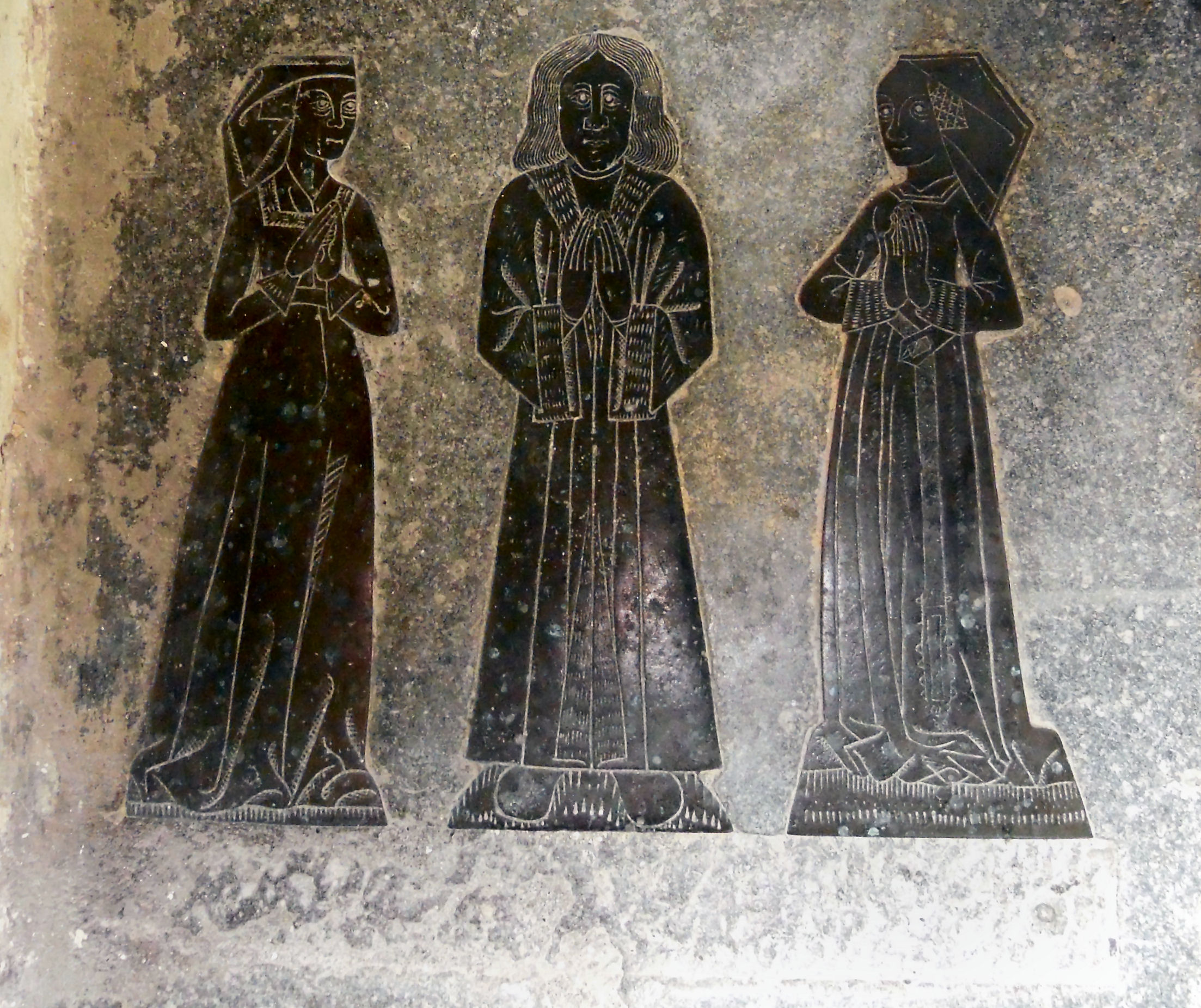
Brass of a man and his two wives

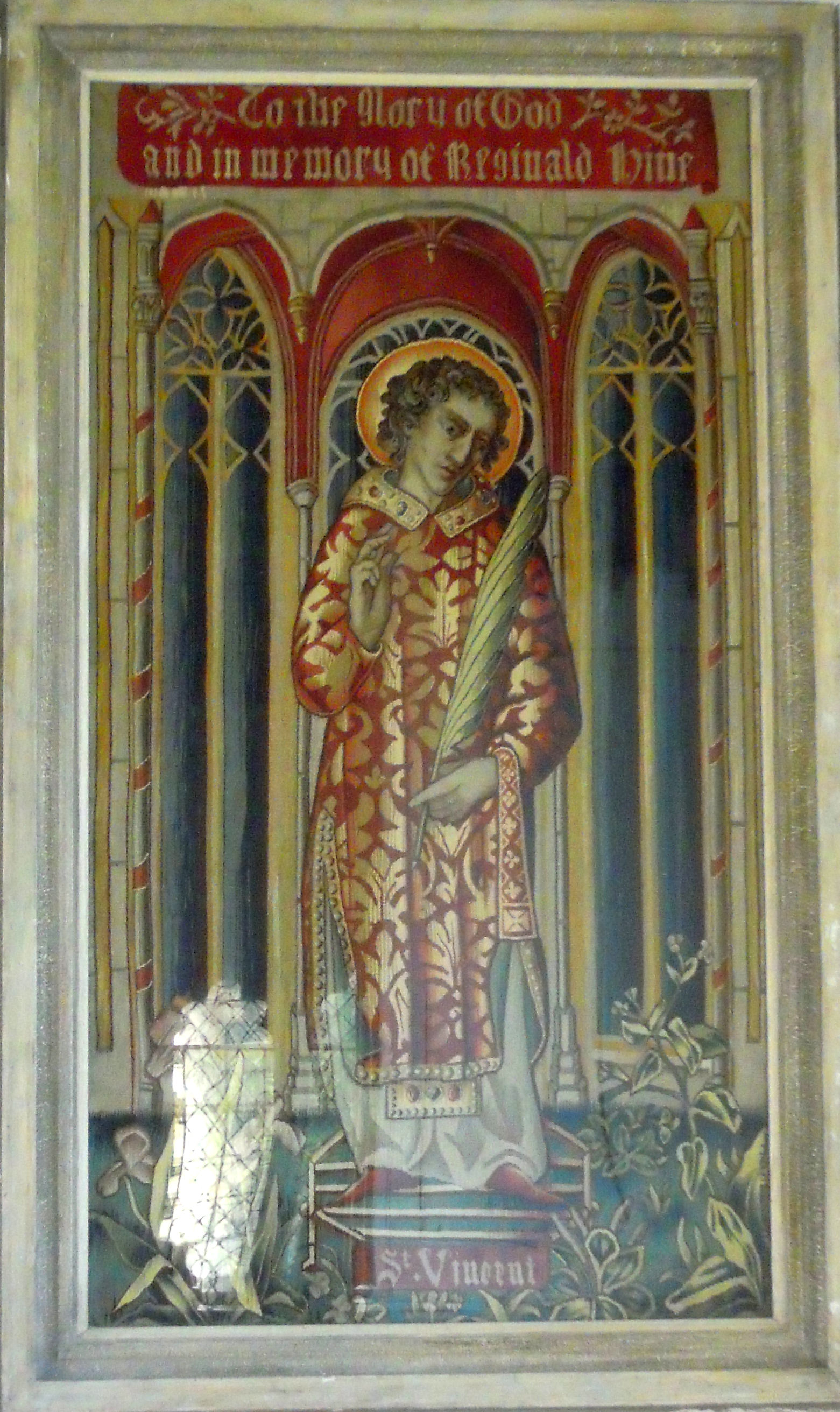
Embroidery dedicated to historian Reginald Hine
