= Minsden Chapel =

Chapel in Langley, Hertfordshire, UK

Coordinates: 51.906631°N 0.259552°W

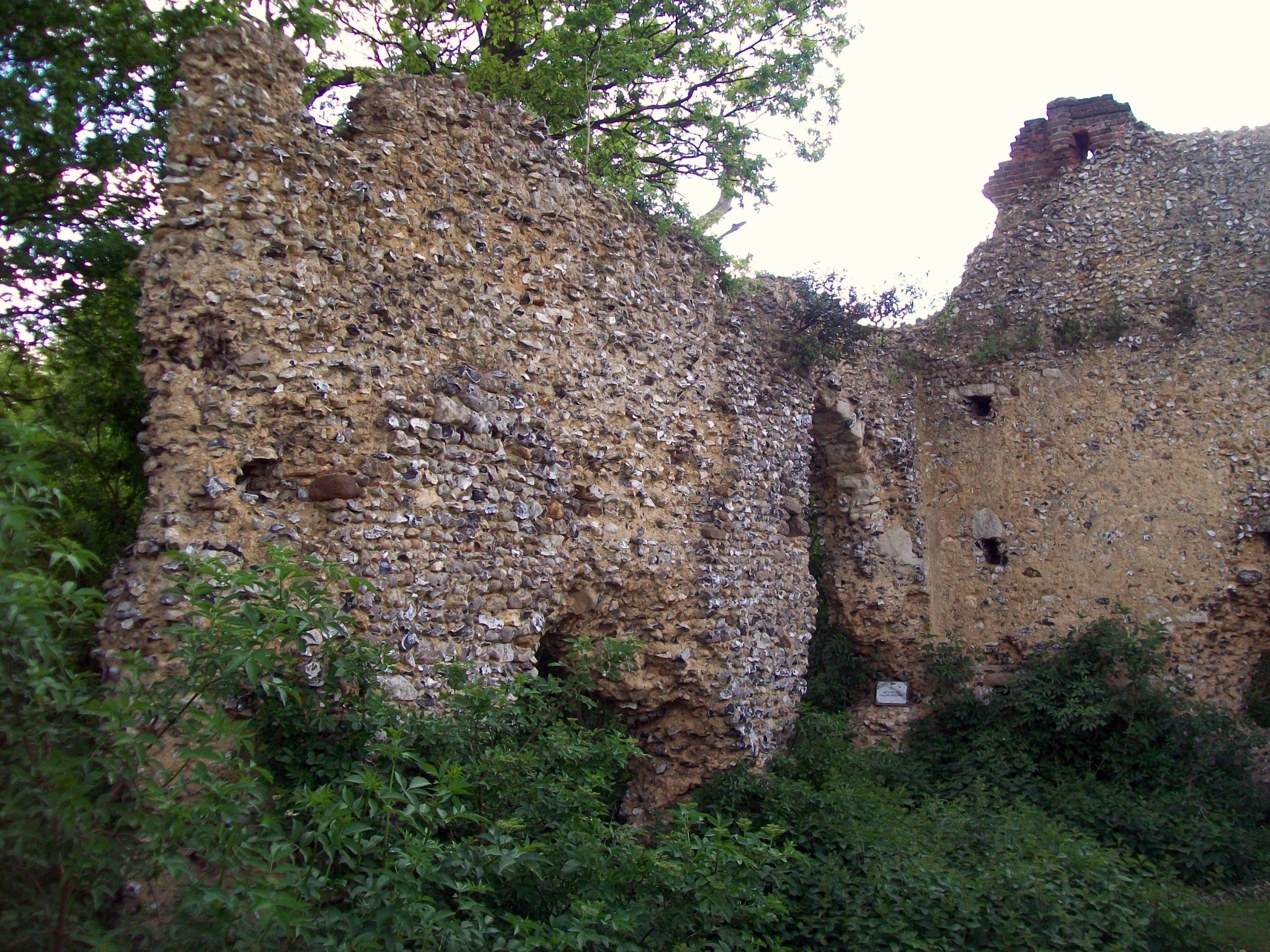
The ruined Minsden Chapel in 2010

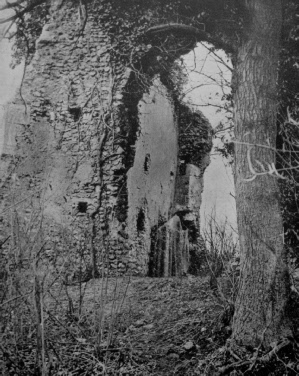
T.W. Latchmore's hoax photograph of the Minsden ghost (1907)

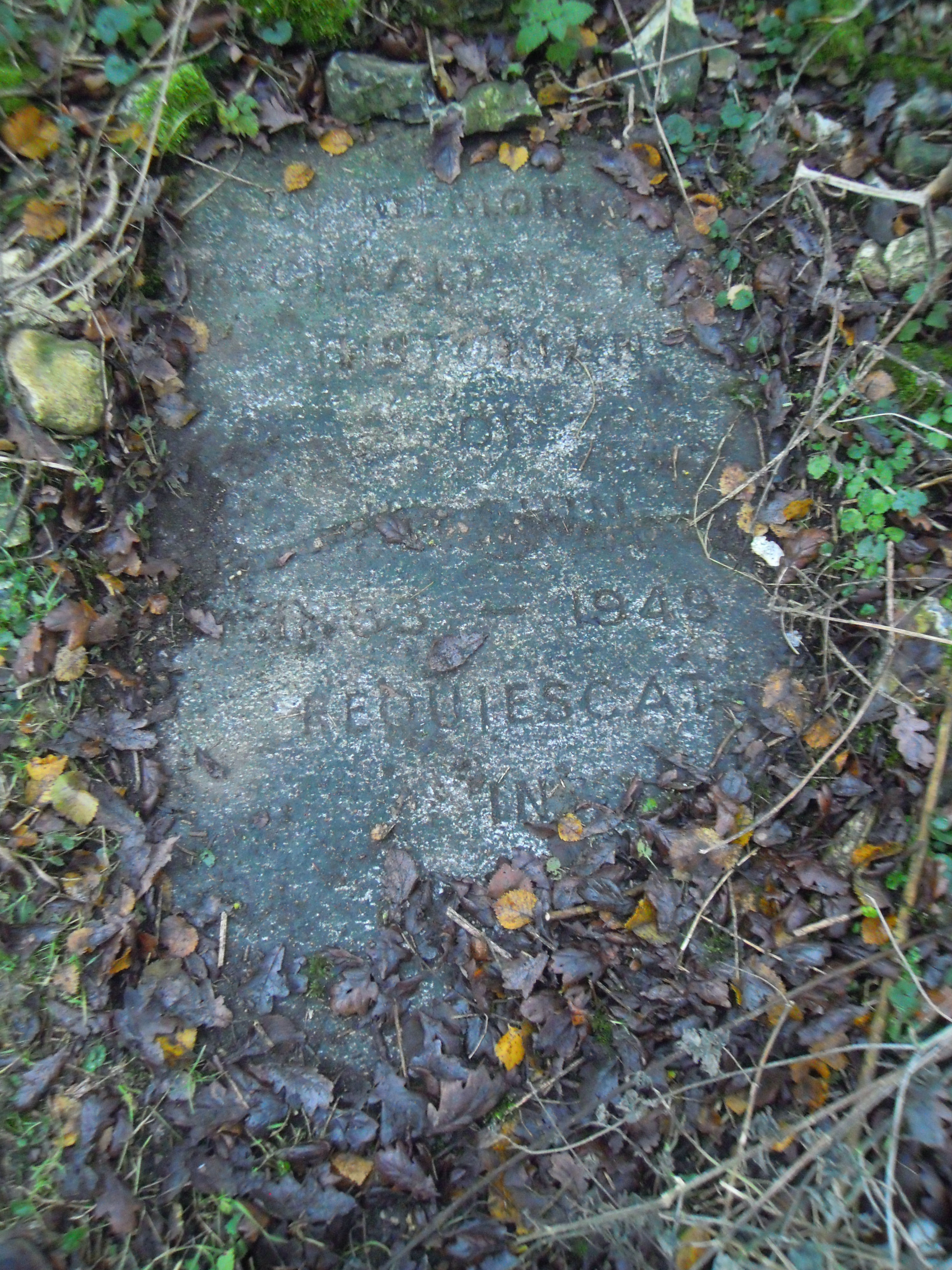
Memorial to Reginald Hine at Minsden Chapel

Minsden Chapel is an isolated ruined chapel in the fields above the hamlet of Chapelfoot, near Preston, Hertfordshire. Today it is a roofless shell, partly surrounded by a small wood, and accessible only by footpath. It is a Scheduled Monument and is Grade II Listed.

== History ==
The chapel was built in the 14th century, and by the 17th century had fallen into disrepair. Marriages continued here into the 18th century, until the crumbling masonry became too dangerous. One story says that a piece of falling stonework knocked the prayer-book out of a curate's hand during the marriage ceremony of Enoch West and Mary Horn on the 11th of July 1738.

In the 20th century the chapel was closely associated with the historian Reginald Hine from nearby Baldock. He frequently visited here, and eventually obtained a lifetime lease of the building from the vicars of Hitchin. So fond of the chapel was he, that he even bade "trespassers and sacrilegious persons take warning, for I will proceed against them with the utmost rigour of the law, and, after my death and burial, I will endeavour, in all ghostly ways, to protect and haunt its hallowed walls". Contrary to popular belief Hine is not buried at Minsden. His body was cremated at Golders Green (London) and his ashes were subsequently scattered at the chapel. His family erected a memorial stone at the site, which was subsequently re-laid in its current grave-like horizontal position by them after it was damaged by vandals in the early 1980s.

In 1907, Thomas William Latchmore, a local professional photographer and friend of Hine, took a photograph that supposedly showed a ghostly monk at the Chapel. Rumours of paranormal activity first appeared around this time. The haunting most frequently reported is that of a single monk climbing stairs (which no longer exist) to the north-east area of the chapel; this is said to occur at midnight on Halloween. Other reported experiences include the sighting of a glowing cross on the wall, and the hearing of distant music or the ringing of the stolen bells. Legends also exist of a lost tunnel built during the time of the Crusades that extended to nearby Temple Dinsley, and another of a murdered nun.

In an interview given in 1930 to Elliott O'Donnell, a well-known contemporary writer on occult matters, Latchmore finally admitted that his 'Minsden Ghost' photograph was a hoax. He explained that the picture was the deliberate result of an experiment in the techniques of double exposures, a subject that interested him greatly at the time. Although Latchmore refused to disclose the identity of the individual who had posed as the ghostly figure, it seems likely that it was a young man well known for practical jokes, Latchmore's good friend Reginald Hine. Hine re-published the photograph in 1929 in his History of Hitchin but never admitted it was a fake nor his own part in it.

Paranormal investigator Peter Underwood once spent a night there in the late 1940s, during which he claimed to have heard the sound of distant music and to have seen a white glowing cross on one of the walls, which disappeared and then reappeared, although he suggested "it could possibly have been a trick of the moonlight, as a full moon was shining down through the trees at the time".

The iconic arch of Minsden Chapel finally fell in 2008 due to time and erosion from the elements, and by 2012 most of the north-facing wall had also disappeared. In 2017, it was reported that the Church Commissioners for England, who own the site, were intending to sell it to a "surrounding landowner", sparking fears that the public could lose access to the site.

Work to repair Minsden Chapel by Natural England, in partnership with Historic England, started in March 2022 with the intention of stabilising the arch openings of the south wall, to conserve the overall structure, and to install hard-capping over the wall head.

== Gallery ==
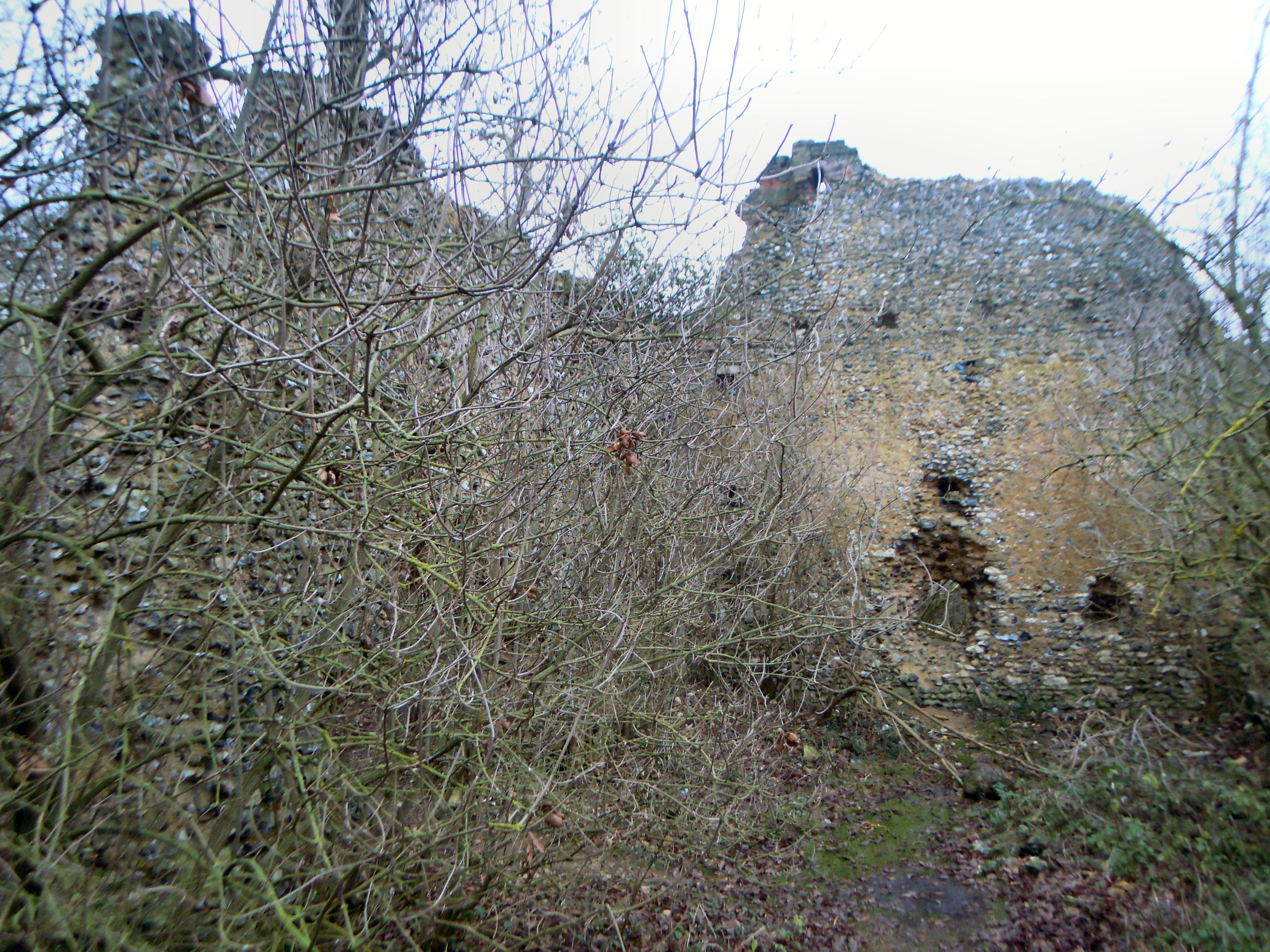
Minsden Chapel in 2016

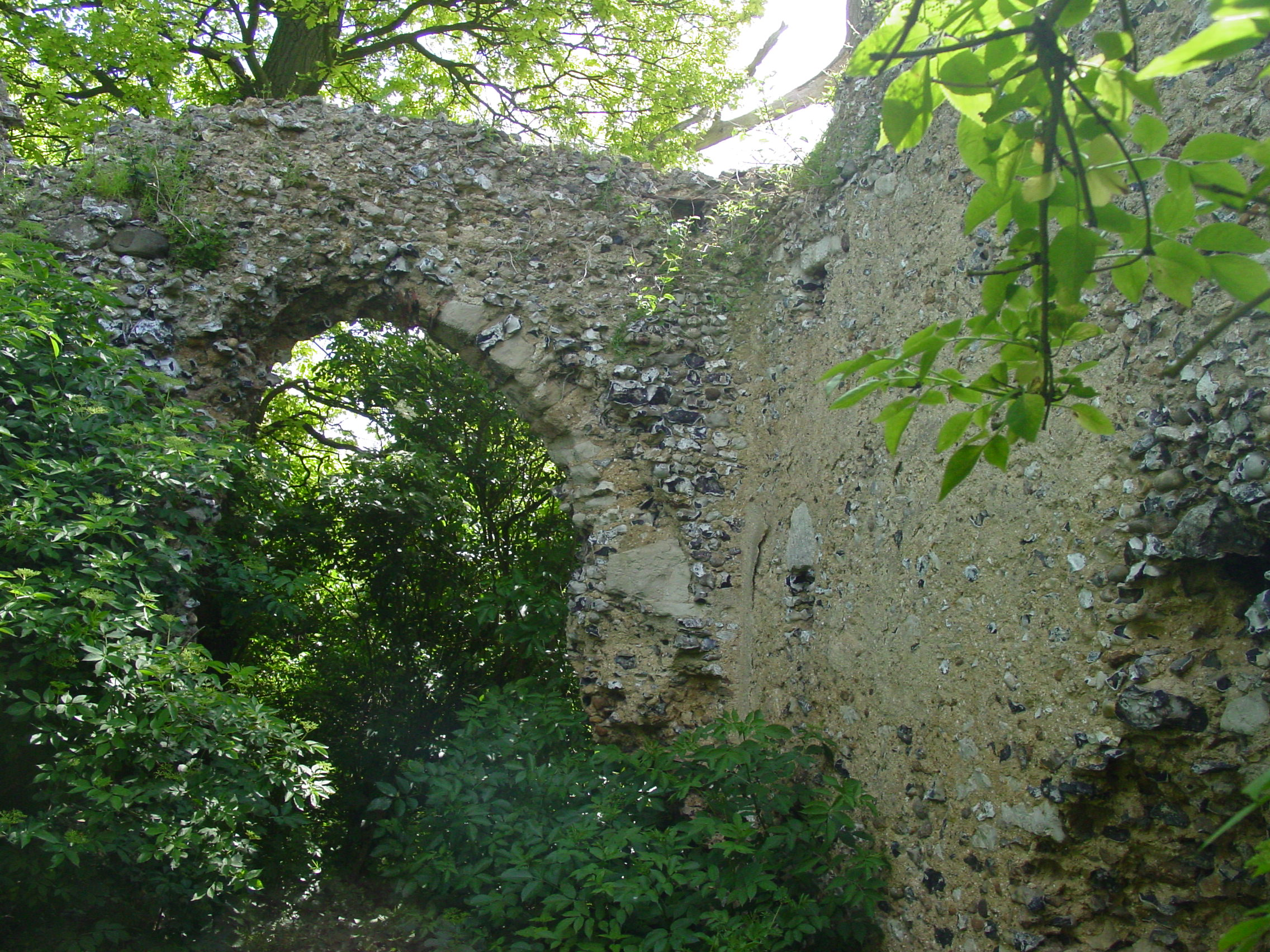
The overgrown ruins of Minsden chapel, in May 2004
