= Reginald Hine =

English solicitor and historian (1883–1949)

Reginald Leslie Hine photographed shortly before his death

Reginald Leslie Hine (25 September 1883 – 14 April 1949) FSA FRHS was a solicitor and historian whose writings centred on the market-town of Hitchin in Hertfordshire and its environs. He ended his life in 1949 by jumping in front of a train at Hitchin railway station when facing disciplinary proceedings from The Law Society.

== Early years ==
Hine was born in 1883 at Newnham Hall near Baldock in Hertfordshire, the son of Alderman Joseph Neville Hine (1849–1931), a tenant farmer, and his wife Eliza Taylor (1843–1892). Hine was educated at Grove House in Baldock, was privately tutored by the Revd George Todd of Baldock, and attended Kent College in Canterbury and The Leys School in Cambridge.

== Minsden Chapel ==
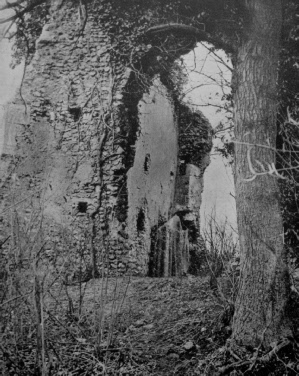
T.W. Latchmore's hoax photograph of the Minsden ghost (1907)

In 1907 Hine and two others, the Hitchin photographer Thomas William Latchmore (1882–1946) and the artist and etcher F. L. Griggs, took a camera to Minsden Chapel with the intention of photographing the ghost of a monk who it was believed had been murdered there and whose spirit was said to emerge from the stone walls of the ruined chapel. Hine claimed that they had been successful and published the resulting photograph in his The History of Hitchin. The photograph is now accepted as having been a practical joke at best, and a hoax at worst.

Hine frequently visited the chapel, and eventually obtained a lifetime lease from the vicars of Hitchin. So fond of the building was he, that he even bade "trespassers and sacrilegious persons take warning, for I will proceed against them with the utmost rigour of the law, and, after my death and burial, I will endeavour, in all ghostly ways, to protect and haunt its hallowed walls".

== Solicitor and historian ==
Hine studied law and became an articled clerk aged 18, working for the long-established firm of Hawkins and Company of Hitchin, but despite his claims to the contrary he did not qualify as a solicitor until he was 50 in 1933. He then went into partnership with local solicitor Reginald Hartley, and for the remaining 16 years of his life practised with the firm of Hartley and Hine until his sudden retirement on 31 March 1949, just two weeks before his death.

In 1910 he delivered a lecture on the history of The Manor of Newnham, where he had been born 27 years earlier.

He was one of the founders of Hitchin Museum which houses many of his own documents. An unenthusiastic solicitor, Hine's first love was the study of the history of his home area. He wrote a number of volumes on the history of Hitchin and its environs, including his The History of Hitchin (1929) and Hitchin Worthies (1932), which won national acclaim. In 1934 he was commissioned to write the History of Stagenhoe.

Historian W. G. Hoskins described Hine's The History of Hitchin as "first class", while Professor G. M. Trevelyan said "I have nothing but admiration for the method, plan and style of it". However, others were not so enthusiastic about Hine's works, questioning his use of sources and historical accuracy, further claiming that Hine would often stretch the facts to make a good story.

== Personal life ==
Hine married Florence Lee Pyman (b. 1888/9) on 11 April 1912 in Hampstead and their daughter Felicity was born in 1915.

Hine was judged unfit for military service during World War I and he and his family moved to Hitchin in 1917 and to nearby Willian in 1929. In the same year Hine was elected a Fellow of the Society of Antiquaries of London. In 1930 he was elected a Fellow of the Royal Historical Society.

== Death ==
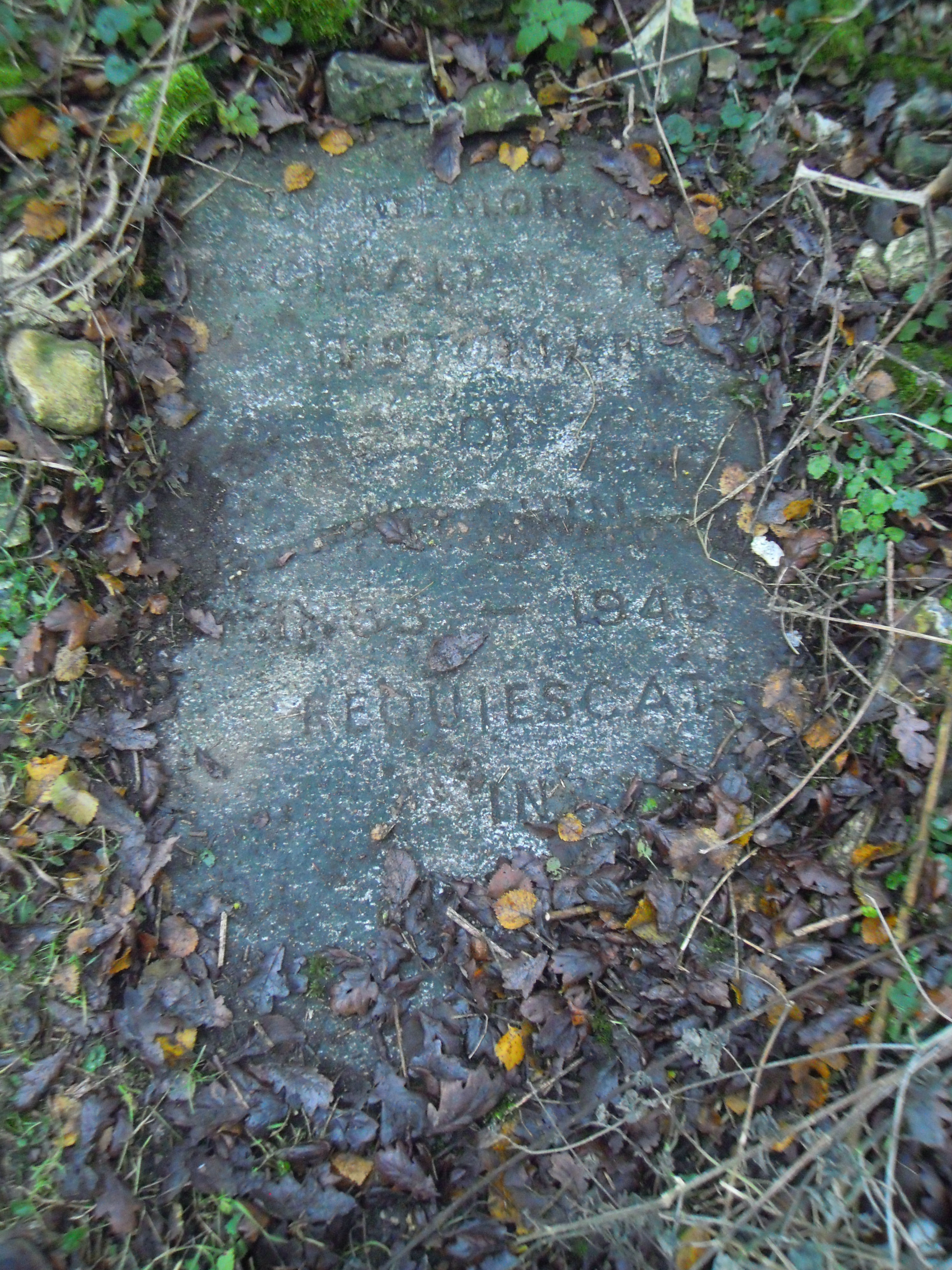
Hine's memorial at Minsden Chapel

Hine suffered from depression in his later years, and in Confessions of an Uncommon Attorney (1946) he acknowledged that "the strain of leading a double life, the accumulation of office worries, and the burden of clients’ woes had worn me down".

He died of suicide in 1949, jumping in front of a train at Hitchin railway station. At the time of his death Hine faced being struck off as a solicitor for professional misconduct, having contacted both sides in a divorce case contrary to Law Society rules. He left behind 60 boxes of material for his planned History of Hertfordshire.

Hine was cremated at Golders Green Crematorium on 19 April 1949, at the same time that his memorial service was being held at St Mary's Church in Hitchin. His ashes were scattered at Minsden Chapel.

== After death ==
Hine's last book, Relics of an Uncommon Attorney, a collection of his later writings, was published posthumously by his friend Richenda Scott. Hitchin Historical Society has been awarding the Reginald Hine Award since 1979.

A biography, The Ghosts of Reginald Hine: An Uncommon Attorney, by Richard Whitmore, was published in 2007.

== Bibliography ==
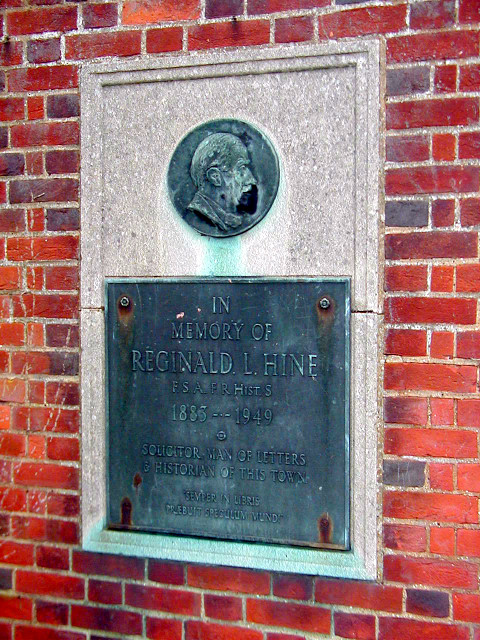
Memorial to Hine at Lower Tilehouse Street in Hitchin

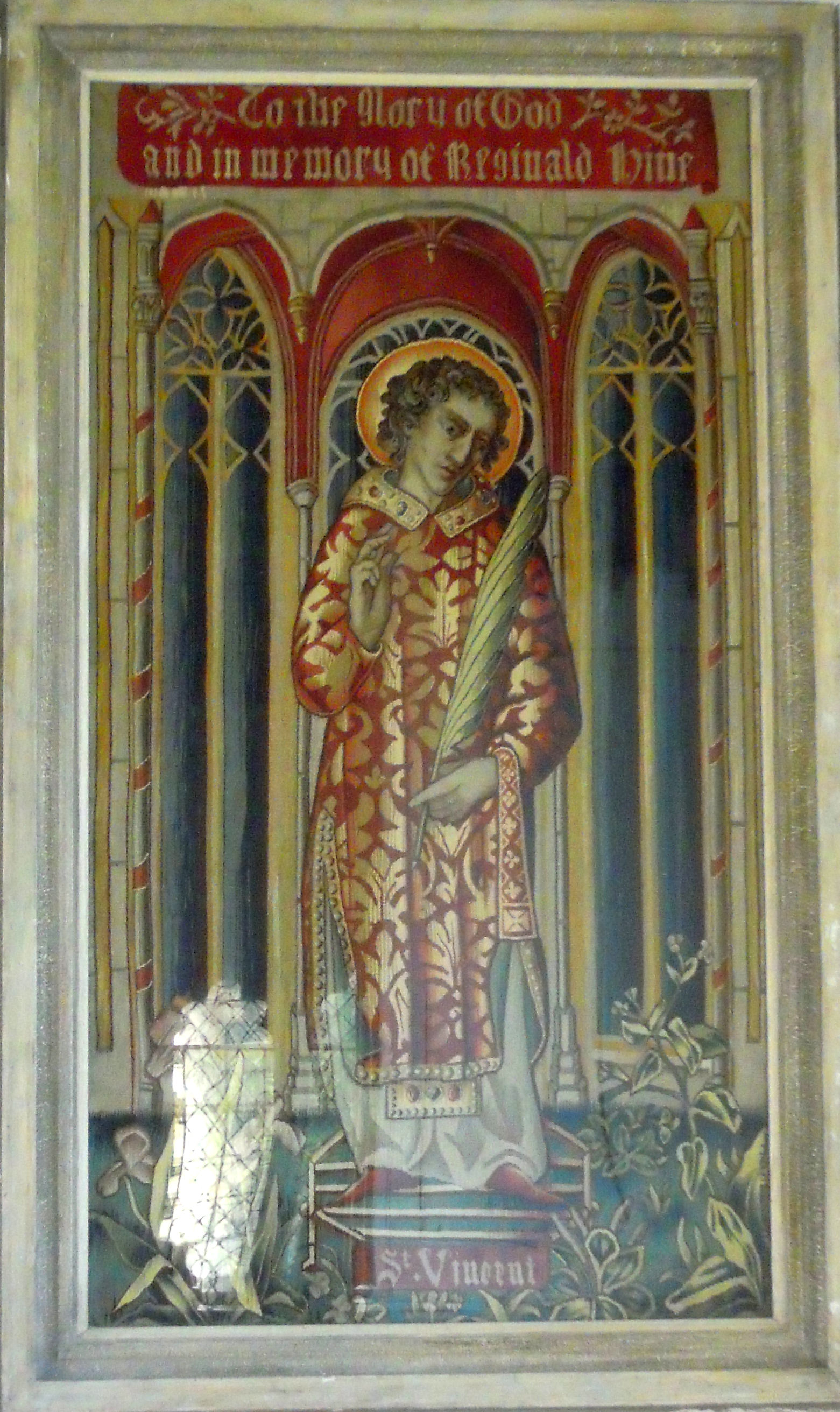
Embroidery which hung in Hine's home now in the Church of St Vincent, Newnham

- Anima Celtica, Elkin Mathews, London (1912)
- Dreams and the Way of Dreams, J.M. Dent & Sons, London (1913)
- Hitchin Priory, Carling & Hales, Hitchin (1919)
- The Cream of Curiosity, George Routledge & Sons, London (1920)
- The History of Hitchin, George Allen & Unwin, London (1927–1929, 2 volumes)
- Samuel Lucas, His Life and Art Work, Walker's Galleries, London (1928)
- A Mirror for the Society of Friends: Being the Story of the Hitchin Quakers, George Allen & Unwin, London (1929, revised 2nd Edition 1930)
- A Short Story of St Mary's, Hitchin, Paternoster & Hales, Hitchin (1930, revised 2nd Edition 1936, reprinted 1940, 1945, 1948)
- The George and Dragon, Codicote (c.1930)
- History of Hitchin Grammar School, Paternoster and Hales, Hitchin (1931)
- The Official Guide to Hitchin, Paternoster and Hales, Hitchin (1932)
- Hitchin Worthies, George Allen & Unwin, London (1932)
- The History of Stagenhoe (1934)
- The Natural History of The Hitchin Region, Wm. Carling & Co (for Hitchin & District Regional Survey Association), Hitchin (1934)
- The Story of Methodism at Hitchin, Hitchin Methodist Church, Hitchin (1934)
- The Story of the Sun Hotel Hitchin (1575-1937), Wm. Carling & Co, Hitchin (1937, 2nd Edition 1946)
- The Story of Hitchin Town, Wm. Carling & Co, Hitchin (1938, 2nd Edition 1949)
- Confessions of an Un-Common Attorney, J.M. Dent & Sons, London (1945, reprinted 1945, 1946, 1949)
- Hitchin Old and New: Fifty Photographs and Drawings, Privately Published, Hitchin (1946)
- The Hitchin Countryside: Photographs and Drawings, Wm. Carling & Co, Hitchin (1946)
- Charles Lamb and His Hertfordshire, J.M. Dent & Sons, London (1949)
- Relics of an Un-Common Attorney, J.M. Dent & Sons, London (1951, reprinted 1952)
