= Long Distance Wireless Photography =

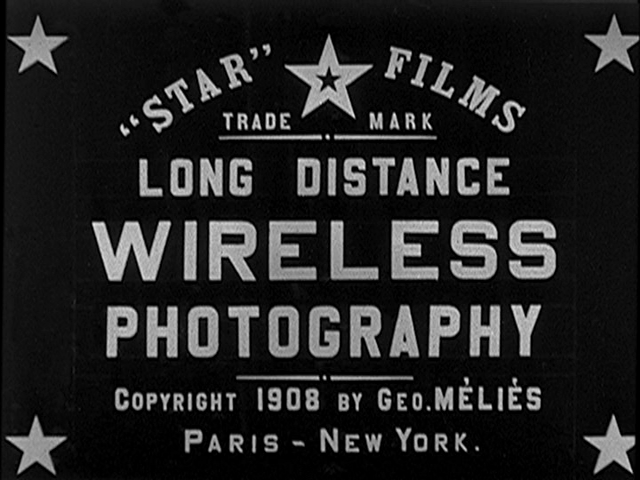
- Title card for the film
- Directed by: Georges Méliès
- Starring: Georges Méliès; Fernande Albany
- Production company: Star Film Company
- Release date: 1908
- Running time: 115 meters
- Country: France
- Language: Silent

La Photographie électrique à distance, released in the United States as Long Distance Wireless Photography and in Britain as Electrical Photographer, is a 1908 French silent comic trick film directed by Georges Méliès.

== Plot ==
Long Distance Wireless Photography (1908)

In a glass-roofed workshop, an inventor is surrounded by mechanical devices for a complicated machine. The inventor's servants show in a respectably dressed lady and gentleman; the inventor welcomes them in and begins to demonstrate his invention to them. Setting the machine in motion, he unrolls a large screen and places a small image of the Three Graces on a chair; thanks to the machine, the Graces are projected at life-size on the screen, and they briefly come to life before disappearing. Next, the inventor and his staff give a further demonstration, with a model in Grecian garb being projected. As before, the projected image takes on its own life, waving to the gentleman visitor.

The visitors indicate that they are ready to be photographed by the wireless process, and the lady takes a seat in front of the photographic apparatus. Her head appears in close up, projected on the screen; the projected head makes grotesque faces, including a mostly toothless grin and a fierce scowl. The lady faints from shock and has to be revived with smelling salts. The inventor, proffering apologies, ushers the gentleman client to the seat, but he fares even worse: his projected portrait shows him as a hairy, monkey-like creature, gibbering maniacally. In a rage, the gentleman runs around the room, trying to destroy the machine, but touching one of the devices gives him an electrical shock that makes his hair stand on end. He rushes to his lady companion, whose outer garments are torn apart when she stands too near another device, leaving her in her chemise and petticoats. The two clients leave the studio in a rage, while the inventor and his servants laugh uproariously.

== Production ==
Méliès appears in the film as the inventor, with Fernande Albany as the lady client.

The film's painted set evokes the contemporary design for photography studios, built partly of glass and iron; the actual studio in which Méliès made his films was built on such a design. Several other Méliès sets have similarly self-referential elements, including the photography studio in A Mix-up in the Gallery and the workshops and factories in A Trip to the Moon, The Impossible Voyage, and The Conquest of the Pole. The film's special effects were created using substitution splices, superimpositions, and dissolves.

== Themes ==
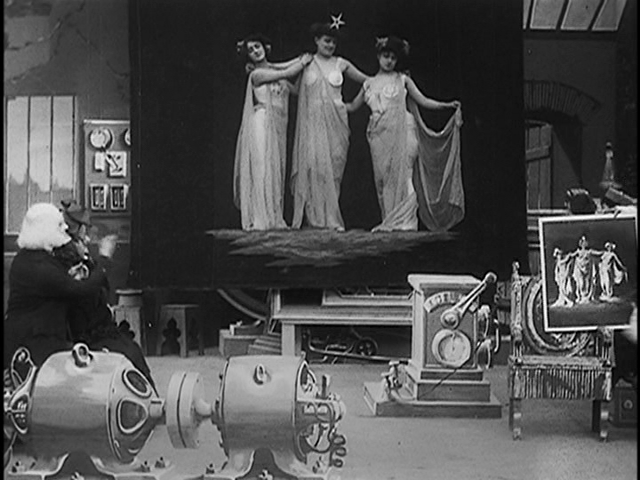
The Three Graces appear on the inventor's screen

With its photographic apparatus creating fresh and unexpected views of its subjects, Long Distance Wireless Photography can be seen as an allegory for the seemingly magical properties of cinema. The film scholar Mark Bould described the film as a satirical look at film's capabilities for artificiality and realism:

Méliès's embrace of artifice satirises the notion that by capturing the surface of the world the camera not only reveals things indiscernible to human perception but also shows the 'truth' of the world. At the same time, the satirical portraits … suggest artifice's ability to project truths that elude the camera's photochemical recording processes.

The film can also be seen as anticipatory science fiction; the film scholar Linda Williams cited the film as "an uncanny anticipation of the not yet invented marvel of television." The film writer Dennis Fischer likewise described the film as showing "a large screen television some twenty years before the device's actual invention." The film critic William B. Parrill likened the machine to a science-fiction device in the 1958 film The Fly: "Unfortunately, it seems to be some sort of matter transmitter, like those in The Fly, which occasionally mixes in the odd bit of extraneous matter."

The philosopher Eugene Thacker cited Long Distance Wireless Photography as an example of his concept of dark media, "the mediation of that which is unavailable or inaccessible to the senses". Thacker notes that the machine in the film, by generating comically altered versions of the things it is intended to photograph, "serves a kind of pedagogical function as to the inner workings of cinema itself." Other Méliès films with themes relating to dark media include The Mysterious Retort and The Black Imp.

Williams described sexist and voyeuristic overtones in the scene in which an image of the Three Graces is projected, "reproducing an image of women's bodies to the voyeuristic measure of male desire." The film scholar Elizabeth Ezra went further, commenting that the machine does not in fact attempt to show actual women at all, but rather only an image from a male imagination: "These constructed women are also machines in themselves, which do exactly what they are programmed to do, and whose behavior differs noticeably from that of real women."

A publication about Méliès's films from the Centre national du cinéma suggested that the film is about revealing the psychology of a person, capturing their real selves, through an imaginary photographic means; thus the lady client is shown as much less friendly and appealing than she appears to be real life, while her gentleman companion, evidently an elderly rake, is depicted as a monkey or satyr-like creature. The film scholar François Jost agreed, describing the projection as an image "probably in reflection of [the subject's] soul" ("sans doute à l'image de son âme").

== Release and reception ==
The film was released by Méliès's Star Film Company and is numbered 1091–1095 in its catalogues. It was registered for American copyright at the Library of Congress on 24 March 1908.

Parrill describes the film as "only moderately humorous," speculating that it "was probably too complex for the average audience to understand."
