= Great Ghost Tales =

American horror TV horror series (1961)

- Genre: Horror
- Country of origin: United States
- Original language: English
- No. of seasons: 1
- No. of episodes: 12

Production
- Running time: 30 minutes
- Production company: Talent Associates

Original release
- Network: NBC
- Release: July 6 – September 21, 1961

Great Ghost Tales is an American horror television series that aired live from July 6 until September 21, 1961. The program was the summer replacement for The Ford Show.

== Premise ==
An anthology of scary stories. Authors whose works were presented included William Fryer Harvey.

== Cast ==
Actors featured in the series included Judith Evelyn, Richard Thomas, Robert Duvall, Joanne Linville, Laurie Main, Lee Grant, Arthur Hill, Lois Nettleton, Salome Jens, Ruth White, Mildred Dunnock, R. G. Armstrong, Janet Ward, Edmon Ryan, David J. Stewart, Collin Wilcox, James Broderick, Vincent Gardenia, Virginia Leith, Herbert Voland, John Abbott Blanche Yurka, Clifford David, Ann Williams, Eric Berry, William Redfield, Diana Van Der Vlis, Walter Matthau, and Kevin McCarthy.

== Episodes ==
No.	Title	Directed by	Written by	Original release date
1	"William Wilson"	Daniel Petrie	James Lee	July 6, 1961
The lookalike of a drifter keeps following him everywhere. (Based on the short story by Edgar Allan Poe.)
2	"Lucy"	Allen Reisner	Joel Davenport	July 13, 1961
Lucy gets her wish when she wishes that the director of her play would die.
3	"The Monkey's Paw"	Karl Genus	Audrey Maas	July 20, 1961
The holder of a monkey's paw gets three wishes. (Based on the short story by W. W. Jacobs.)
4	"Bye Bye Baby"	Unknown	Elliott Baker	July 27, 1961
A hypnotist promises Ralph that he will be a young man again if he follows his instructions.
5	"August Heat"	Ron Winston	Robert Thom	August 3, 1961
An artist keeps sketching a face he sees in his imagination. (Based on the short story by William Fryer Harvey.)
6	"Summer Rental"	William A. Graham	Nicholas Pryor	August 10, 1961
A villainous couple, who have recently committed a murder rent out a cottage in Devon, however strange happenings begin to occur.
7	"Mr. Arcularis"	Karl Genus	Audrey Maas	August 17, 1961
Mr. Arcularis has nightmares about a coffin on a cruise ship. (Based on the short story by Conrad Aiken; Aiken had also adapted the story in dramatic form, though whether the teleplay is based on his play is not certain.)
8	"Sredni Vashtar"	Ronald Winston	Irving Gaynor Neiman	August 24, 1961
A young boy uses his strange pet to get revenge on his overprotective guardians. (Based on the short story by "Saki", the pseudonym of H. H. Munro.)
9	"A Phantom of Delight"	Seymour Robbie	Douglas Taylor	August 31, 1961
Danny Walton feels compelled to follow the sound of a young girl singing.
10	"Room 13"	Lewis Freedman	Philip H. Reisman Jr.	September 7, 1961
A theological researcher rents a room where a 12th-century bishop made a pact with the devil. (Based on the short story "Number 13" by M. R. James.)
11	"The Wendigo"	Lewis Freedman	Gordon Russell	September 14, 1961
Canadian hunters track a legendary monster. (Based on the novella by Algernon Blackwood.)
12	"Who's the Fairest One of All"	Unknown	Unknown	September 21, 1961
A young schoolteacher looks into an antique mirror, but the reflection it throws back is a different version of herself.

== Production ==
The series was broadcast in color, with each episode produced live in New York. It was on Thursday nights from 9:30 to 10 p.m. Eastern Time. Directors included Daniel Petrie. Writers included James Lee. Talent Associates — Paramount Limited produced the series, and Ford sponsored it. It was replaced by Hazel.

== Reception ==
A review of the premiere episode in The New York Times called the episode "an encouraging send-off for the new venture." The review complimented the presentation and the "skill and sensitivity" of the actors.
