= The Wendigo (novella) =

1910 novel by Algernon Blackwood

- Short story by Algernon Blackwood
- Country: England
- Language: English
- Genre: Horror novella

Publication
- Published in: The Lost Valley and Other Stories
- Publication date: 1910

The Wendigo is a novella by Algernon Blackwood, first published in The Lost Valley and Other Stories (Eveleigh Nash, 1910).

== Synopsis ==
In the wilderness north of Rat Portage in Northwestern Ontario, two Scotsmen – divinity student Simpson and his uncle, Dr. Cathcart, an author of a book on collective hallucination – are on a moose-hunting trip with guides Hank Davis and the wilderness-loving French "Canuck", Joseph Défago.

While their Indian cook, Punk, stays to tend the main camp, the others split up into two hunting-parties. Dr. Cathcart goes with Hank, while Défago guides Simpson in a canoe down the river to explore the vast territory beyond.

Simpson and Défago make camp, and it soon becomes clear that Défago senses – or at least thinks he senses – some strange and fearful odour on the wind. That night, Simpson wakes to find Défago cowering in terror from something outside the tent. A strange voice calls Défago's name, and the guide runs off into the night, forcing Simpson to go and look for him. He follows his footprints in the snow for many miles, realising that Défago's are not the only set of tracks. The larger set of footprints are not human, and gradually it seems that Défago's own tracks have metamorphosed into smaller versions of the larger set. Eventually, both sets of tracks vanish, and Simpson believes he hears Défago's distant voice calling out from somewhere in the sky above:

"Oh! oh! This fiery height! Oh, my feet of fire! My burning feet of fire ...!"

Simpson finally manages to make his way back to the main camp, where he is reunited with the others. Dr. Cathcart and Hank go back with him to search for Défago, and when camping once more out in the wilderness, Défago – or some hideous parody of Défago – appears before them, showing its horribly deformed feet, before vanishing once again into the night.

Conflicted and disturbed about what they have witnessed, they return to the main camp to find that Défago – the real Défago this time – has made his own way back, suffering from delirium, exposure, and frostbite. He dies soon after, and the three men are left in a state of bafflement and uncertainty about what has occurred. Punk alone could have explained it to them, but he fled home as soon as he caught the terrible odour that Défago carried with him. As an Indian, he instantly understood that Défago had seen the Wendigo.

== Reception and influence ==
- Grace Isabel Colbron remarked in her 1915 essay, Algernon Blackwood: An Appreciation that: "For sheer naked concentrated horror, unexplained and unexplainable, such tales as 'The Wendigo'... may be said to lead among the stories of the supernatural".
- H.P. Lovecraft said of The Wendigo: "Another amazingly potent though less artistically finished tale [than Blackwood's The Willows] is The Wendigo, where we are confronted by horrible evidences of a vast forest daemon about which North Woods lumber men whisper at evening. The manner in which certain footprints tell certain unbelievable things is really a marked triumph in craftsmanship."
- August Derleth based his eponymous Cthulhu Mythos entity in the short story Ithaqua on The Wendigo, and in his earlier Wendigo-inspired story, The Thing That Walked on the Wind (Strange Tales of Mystery and Terror, January 1933), he directly namechecks Blackwood and his story of 'air elementals'.
- A half-hour episode of the television series Great Ghost Tales, titled The Wendigo, aired in 1961. It followed the plot of the novel and starred Barbara Barrie and Walter Matthau.
- A loose adaption of The Wendigo by Alvin Schwartz appears in his horror anthology Scary Stories to Tell in the Dark.
- The 2015 PS4 survival horror game Until Dawn features wendigos as its monsters, and is set on the fictional Blackwood Mountain, Alberta, in reference to both the author and this tale.

== See also ==
- Weird Fiction
