= Pettman =

Pettman is a surname. Notable people with the surname include:

- Professor Barrie Pettman, Baron of Bombie (born 1944), British author, publisher and philanthropist.
- Dominic Pettman, cultural theorist and writer
- Edgar Pettman (1866–1943), English organist, choral conductor and music editor
- Stuart Pettman (born 1975), English snooker player
- Toby Pettman (born 1998), English first-class cricketer
