= Howgills, Letchworth Garden City =

Historic building in Letchworth in Hertfordshire

Coordinates: 51.9726°N 0.2269°W

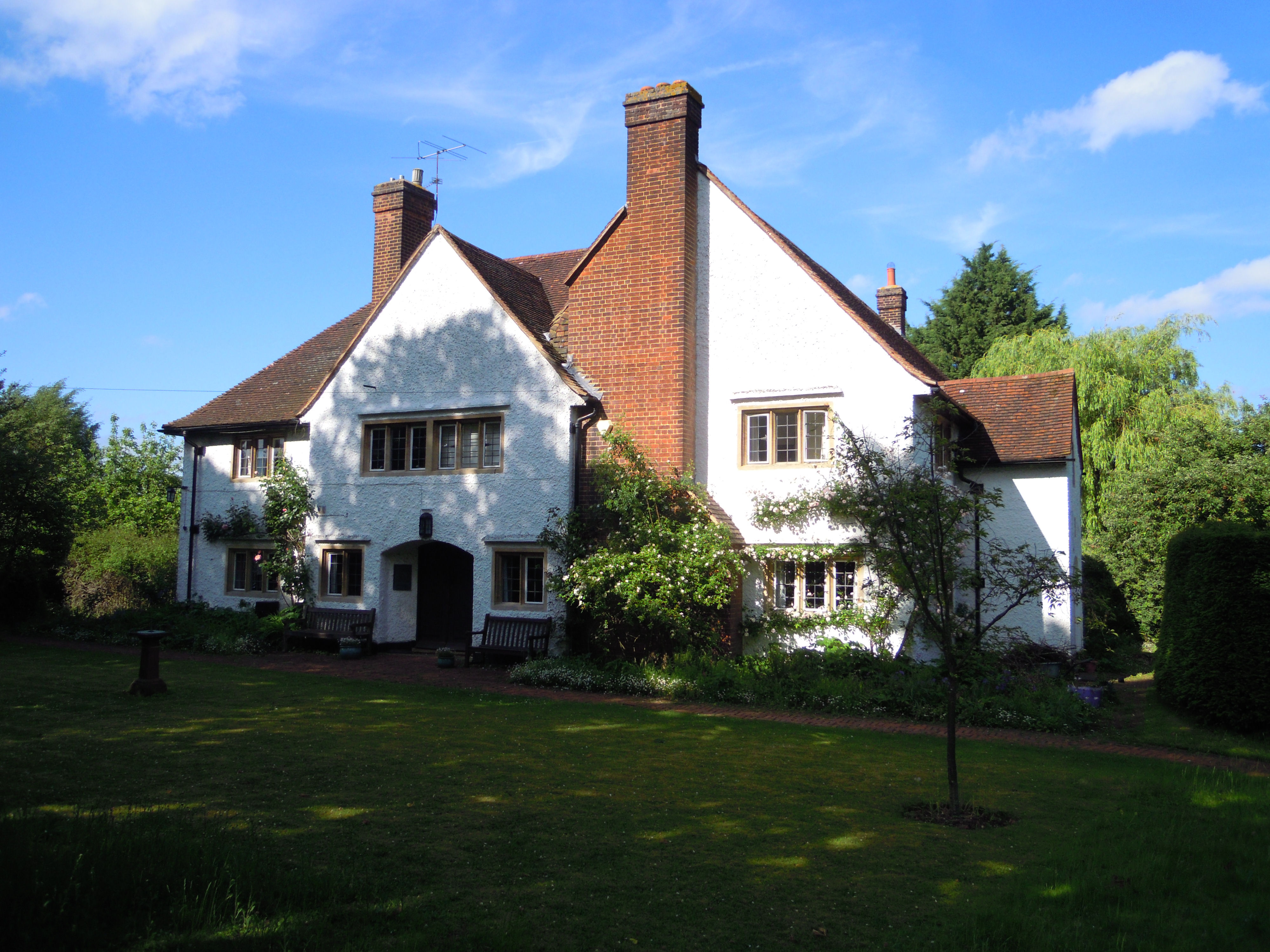
Howgills Meeting House

Howgills in Letchworth Garden City, Hertfordshire, England, is a Grade II listed building on the Register of Historic England in use as a Meeting House for the Society of Friends (Quakers).

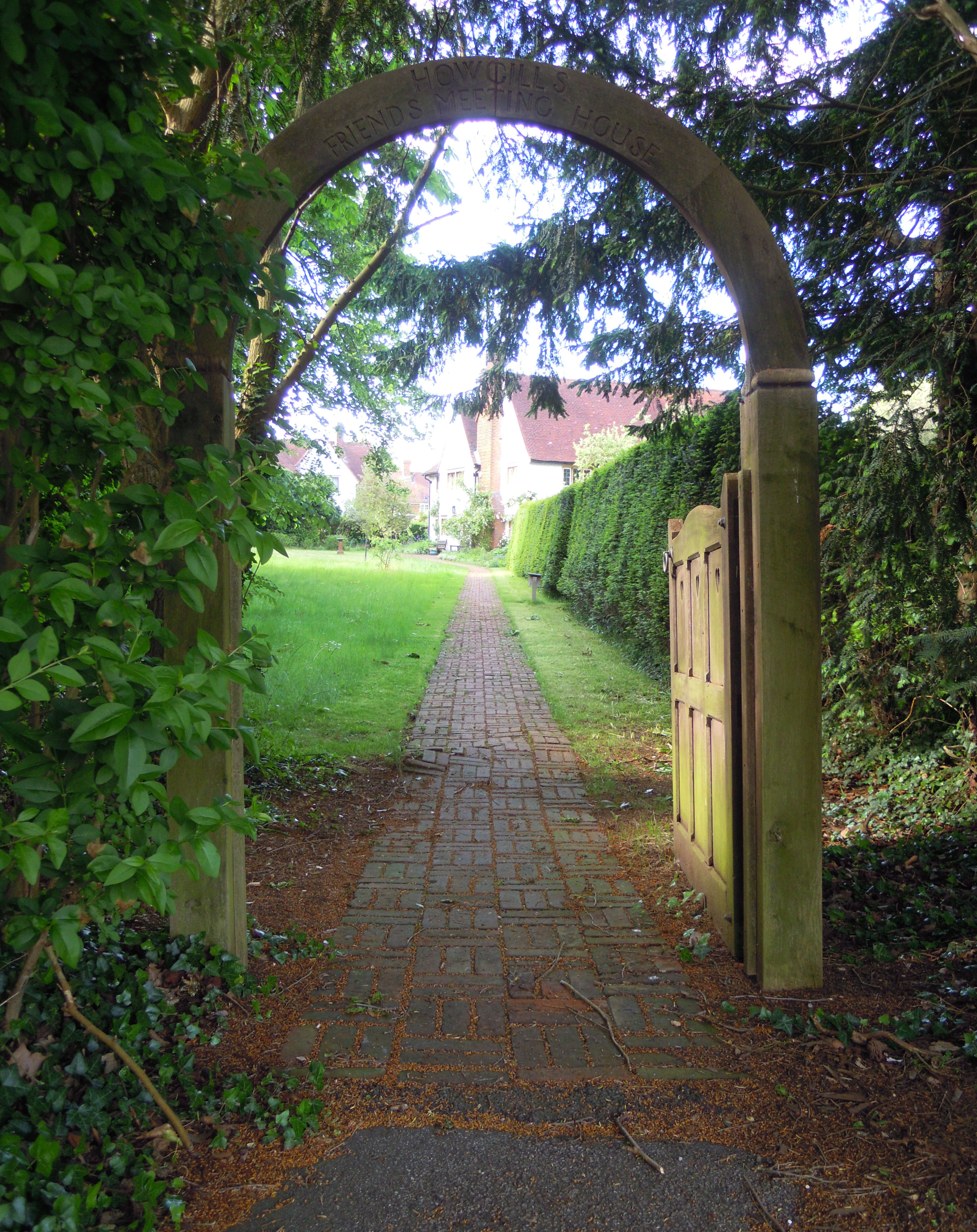
Gate leading to Howgills

Howgills was built on South View in 1907 to a free-style Arts and Crafts design by Robert Bennett (1878–1956) and Benjamin Wilson Bidwell (1877–1944), typical with this firm of architects, although it is thought the design is mostly by Bidwell, a Quaker himself. Associates of Parker & Unwin who were closely connected with the Garden City Movement, Bennett and Bidwell opened an office in Letchworth in 1907 and over the next thirty years went on to design many distinctive buildings in the town. The construction was undertaken by local builders Palmer & Ray. The Meeting House with its large, galleried wood-panelled central meeting room is based on Briggflatts, formerly in Yorkshire and now in Cumbria, and was named after the Howgill Fells that surround that hall. The building is of two storeys with an irregular façade of three bays with a projecting entrance in the centre bay with a gable roof. The brick chimneys stacks are tall with moulded caps, while the stack on the front façade has weathered offsets. The walls have a roughcast surface while the casement windows with leaded lights sit within stone surrounds. The entrance arch is recessed and has boarded double-doors. The carved timber inscriptions over the entrance hall and meeting room fireplaces are apparently early work by Eric Gill. The decorative copper plaque in the porch is in the Art Nouveau style and reads: "THIS BUILDING ERECTED 1907 IS THE GIFT OF JULIET RECKITT TO THE SOCIETY OF FRIENDS".

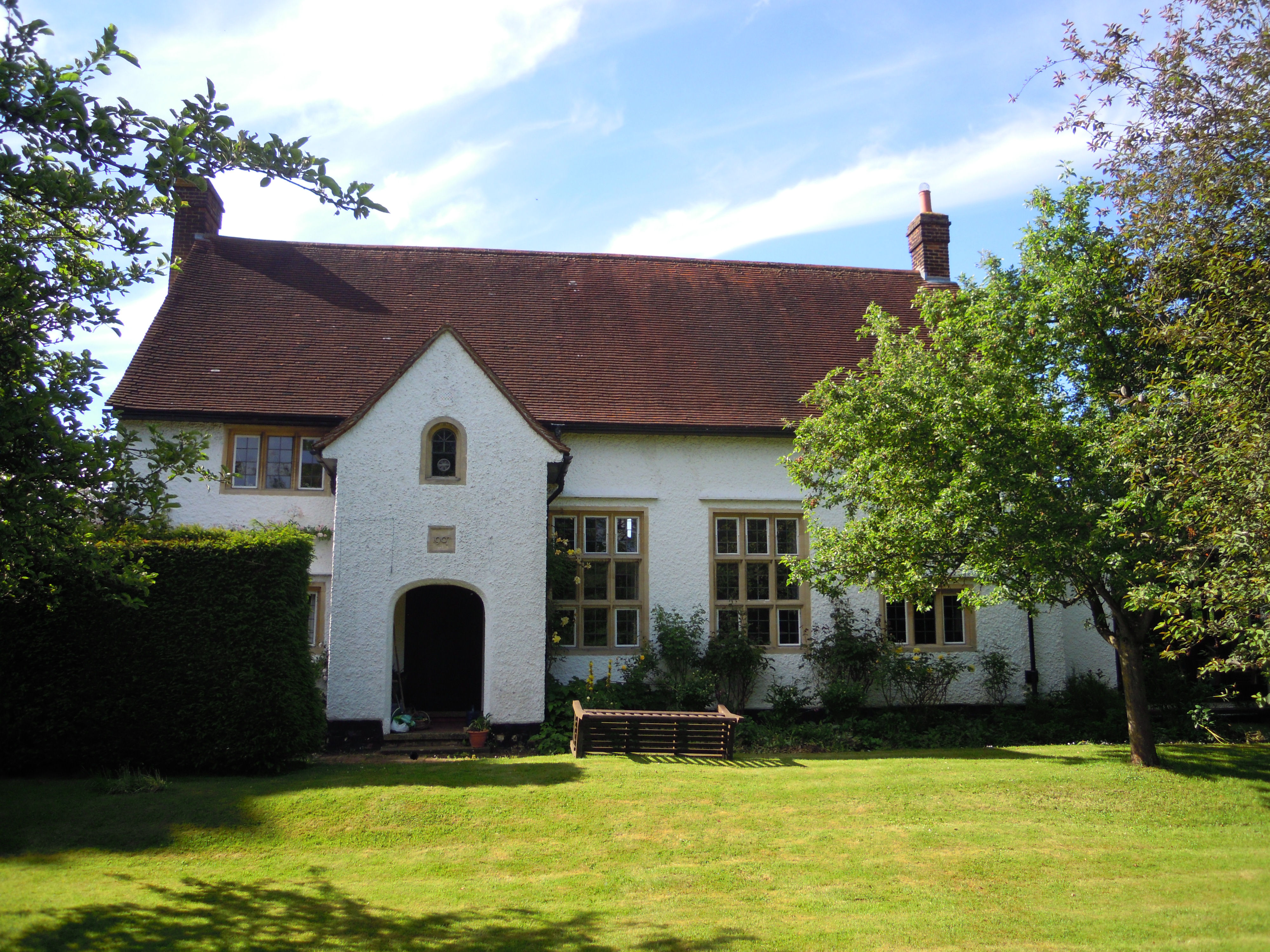
A side view of Howgills

One of Letchworth Garden City’s most distinguished and unique early buildings, Howgills was commissioned by Juliet E. Reckitt, the philanthropic niece of the Hull industrialist Sir James Reckitt; she had moved to Letchworth in its early days and allowed the local Society of Friends (Quakers) to meet in the large Meeting Room in the building. In 1913 she donated Howgills to the Quakers while maintaining a flat for herself within the building. In 1934 she also helped with finance when the Society of Friends decided to purchase the freehold.

The horror writer W. F. Harvey was a member of the congregation. His funeral service was held at Howgills before his burial in the churchyard of St Mary the Virgin in Old Letchworth.

Howgills has been a Grade II listed building on the Register of Historic England since 1979.

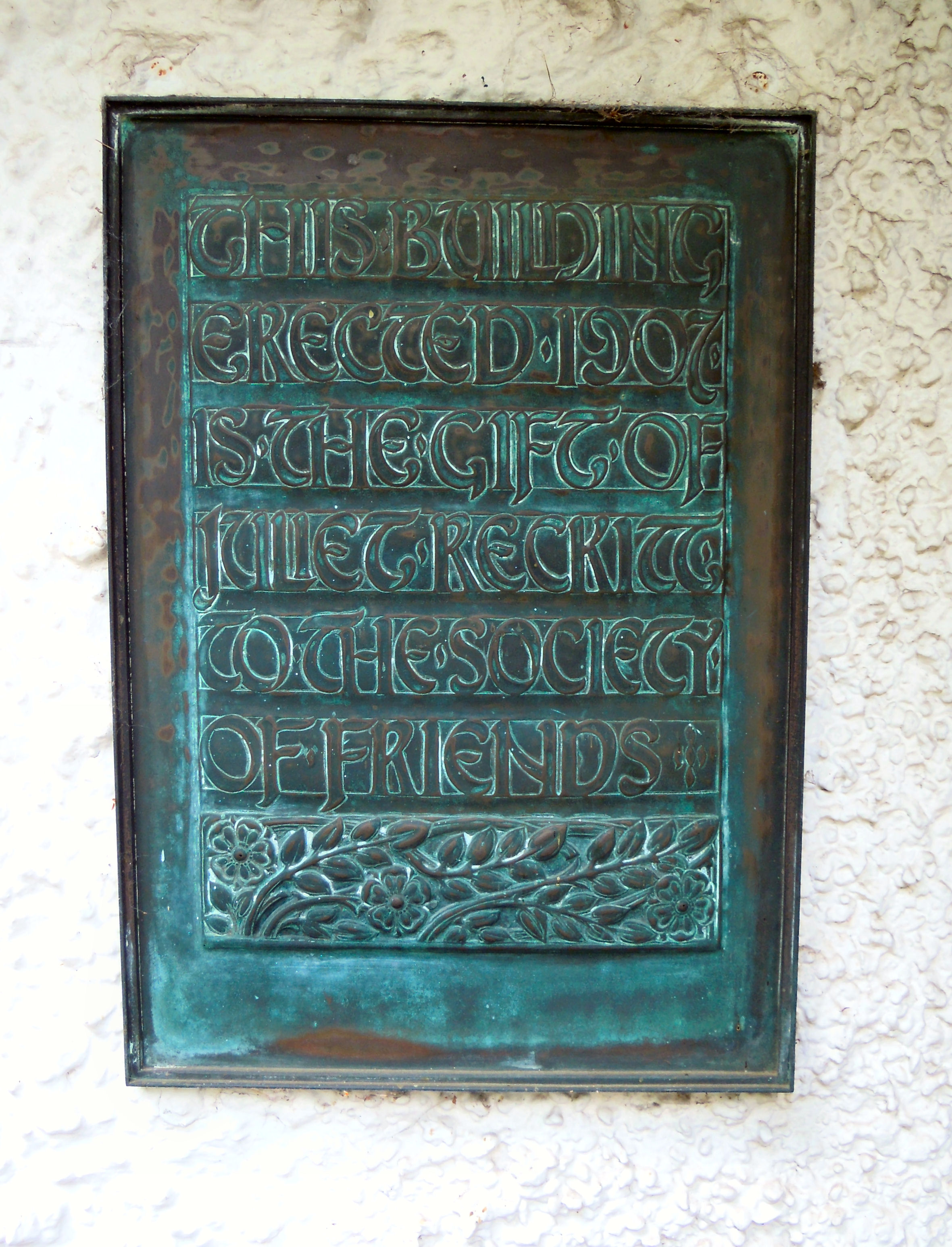
Dedication plaque commemorating the gift of Howgills by Miss Juliet Reckitt
