= Gaming: Essays on Algorithmic Culture =

2006 book by Alexander R. Galloway

- Author: Alexander R. Galloway
- Publisher: University of Minnesota Press
- Publication date: 2006
- Pages: 143
- ISBN: 978-0-8166-4850-4

Gaming: Essays on Algorithmic Culture is a book of five essays on video game studies by Alexander R. Galloway. The essays are a critical analysis of the medium of video games, and its aesthetic and political impact.

== Summary ==
The first chapter, "Gamic Action, Four Moments", outlines the theoretical underpinnings of the book. Proceeding from the premise that "video games are actions", and that they are a collaboration between player and computer, Galloway offers two axes of analysis: operator (i.e., the player) <--> machine (i.e., the computer); and diegetic (i.e. "in-universe") <--> non-diegetic (i.e., "out of character"). For example, firing a weapon is a diegetic operator action; ambience is a diegetic machine action; pausing the game is a non-diegetic operator action; and network lag is a non-diegetic machine action. These four modes of action can also be used to describe individual games: Galloway gives the examples of Tekken, Myst, Warcraft III, and Dance Dance Revolution, respectively.

The fourth chapter, "Allegories of Control", uses video games, as "uniquely algorithmic cultural objects", to think through new possibilities for critical interpretation. The critical framework for this chapter is Gilles Deleuze's "Postscript on the Societies of Control", a short essay from 1990 that builds on Michel Foucault's work on "disciplinary societies". Galloway writes that "what Deleuze defines as control is key to understanding how computerized information societies function." In particular, this chapter focuses on Sid Meier's Civilization, showing how, since electronic networks of control are both visible to players and essential to gameplay, video games have a certain kind of political and critical transparency - that is, because of their nature as a collaboration between player and computer, video games make obvious some elements that other media, such as film, deliberately try to conceal. Galloway argues that this characteristic of video games problematizes ideological critique, because everything in the game must first be codified as a mathematical variable. His remark, "the more one begins to think that Civilization is about a certain ideological interpretation of history ... or even that it creates a computer-generated 'history effect', the more one realises that it is about the absence of history altogether, or rather, the transcoding of history into specific mathematical models", has attracted criticism from historians in games studies like Tom Apperley and Adam Chapman.

== See also ==
- Algorithmic Culture

== Bibliography ==
- Apperley, Tom (2009). Gaming rhythms : play and counterplay from the situated to the global. Amsterdam: Institute of Network Cultures. ISBN 978-90-816021-1-2. OCLC 805986681.
- Chapman, Adam (2013). "Is Sid Meier's Civilization history?". Rethinking History. 17 (3): 312–332. doi:10.1080/13642529.2013.774719. ISSN 1364-2529. S2CID 143370293.
- Deleuze, Gilles (1992). "Postscript on the Societies of Control". October. 59: 3–7. ISSN 0162-2870. JSTOR 778828.
- Galloway, Alexander R. (2006). Gaming : essays on algorithmic culture. Minneapolis: University of Minnesota Press. ISBN 978-0-8166-9863-9. OCLC 247443900.
