= A Hacker Manifesto =

Book by McKenzie Wark

- Author: McKenzie Wark
- Original title: A Hacker Manifesto
- Language: English
- Genre: Philosophy
- Published: October 2004 (Harvard University Press)
- Publication place: United States
- Media type: Hard cover
- Pages: 208
- ISBN: 9780674015432

A Hacker Manifesto is a critical manifesto written by McKenzie Wark, which criticizes the commodification of information in the age of digital culture and globalization. It was published in the United States in 2004.

== Structure, style and influence ==
A Hacker Manifesto is divided into 17 chapters, with each chapter including a series of short numbered paragraphs (a total of 389) that mimics the epigrammic style of Guy Debord's The Society of the Spectacle. The opening sentence in the book, "A double spooks the world, the double of abstraction" is a clear homage to Karl Marx and Friedrich Engels' The Communist Manifesto, which opens with the line "A specter is haunting Europe - the specter of Communism". Wark builds on Marx and Engels’ ideas, alongside Deleuze and Guattari, by adding two new classes of workers into the mix - the "hacker class" and the "vectoralist class".

== Main ideas ==
=== Abstraction/hacker ===
For Wark, hacking begins with what she defines as an "abstraction", the construction of different and unrelated matters into previously unrealized relations. Hackers produce new conceptions, perceptions and sensations hacked out of raw data. Everything and anything is a code for the hacker to hack, be it "programming, language, poetic language, math, or music, curves or colourings" and once hacked, they create the possibility for new things to enter the world. What they create is not necessarily "great", or "even good", but new, in the areas of culture, art, science, and philosophy or "in any production of knowledge where data can be extracted from it."

Wark argues that (new) information comes from the hack. It doesn't matter if you are a computer programmer, a philosopher, a teacher, a musician, a physicist, if you essentially produce new information - it's a hack. In this sense, hackers are creators and they bring new ideas into the world. The aim of the book is to highlight the origins, purpose and efforts by this emerging hacker class, who produce new concepts, perceptions, and sensations out of the stuff of raw data.

=== Commodification of information ===
The commodification of information is about how information that was free is appropriated by the vectoral class. McKenzie claims that free information is not a product, but a condition of the effective allocation of resources. There are many public and gift economies based around free information that keep the question of property open.

According to McKenzie Wark when information becomes a commodity it means we will only be able to see the information produced by the vectoral class. This is because they are the ones whose profits depend on the scarcity of information. So when information becomes intellectual property we are bound to repeat the same commodity form, because this is what the market decrees. She states that the “hack” which monetizes information introduces the “vectoralist” class.

It is the hacker class that produces new information, free from the restrictions of a property form. This however is then used by the vectoral class, who own and control the means of production of information on an industrial scale and mediates connections and access to information (Paolo Pedercini, the founder of the radical games project Molleindustria cites companies like Google, Uber or Airbnb as typical representatives of the vectoral class). The hacker and the vectoral class aren't always at odds with each other. They can compromise on the free flow of information and the extraction of wealth from this information to fund its development. Think of the open source movement, Reddit and Wikipedia. McKenzie Wark believes that the hacker class should ally themselves with the other producing classes so that they together don't have to answer to the vectoral class anymore.

=== Vectoralist Class ===
The hacker's main opposition to creating a world where information is free, and free of scarcity, is what Wark denotes as the "vectoralist" class. Named for their control over vectors (i.e. various pathways and networks over which information flows), the vectoralist class are the modern day dotcom corporate giants, the transnational turbo-capitalist regime, who own the means of production and thus monopolize abstractions. They maintain control by waging "an intensive struggle to dispossess hackers of their intellectual property", enforced by a series of patent and copyright laws that are used to separate the hacker class from the fruits of their labor.

== Reception ==
Terry Eagleton, a British literary theorist writing in The Nation, called the book “a perceptive, provocative study, packed to the seams with acute analysis”.

"Ours is once again an age of manifestos. Wark's book challenges the new regime of property relations with all the epigrammatic vitality, conceptual innovation, and revolutionary enthusiasm of the great manifestos." —Michael Hardt, co-author of Empire

"A Hacker Manifesto will yield some provocative ideas and real challenges to a world in which everything is commodified." —Eric J. Iannelli, The Times Literary Supplement

"Wark- responds to the problems created by the current proliferation of digital culture. [She] pumps air back into Marxian categories and spices them up with Debord and Gautarri. As Millions of young people illegally download electronic information off the Internet, Wark sees possibilities for revolutionary politics grounded on the chaotic circulation of information freed from the regime of property."

"Writers, artists, biotechnologists, and software programmers belong to the 'hacker class' and share a class interest in openness and freedom, while the 'vectoralist' and 'ruling classes' are driven to contain, control, dominate, and own. Wark crafts a new analysis of the tension between the underdeveloped and 'overdeveloped' worlds, their relationships to surplus and scarcity, and the drive toward human actualization." —Michael Jensen, The Chronicle of Higher Education
