= McKenzie Wark =

Australian-born writer and scholar (born 1961)

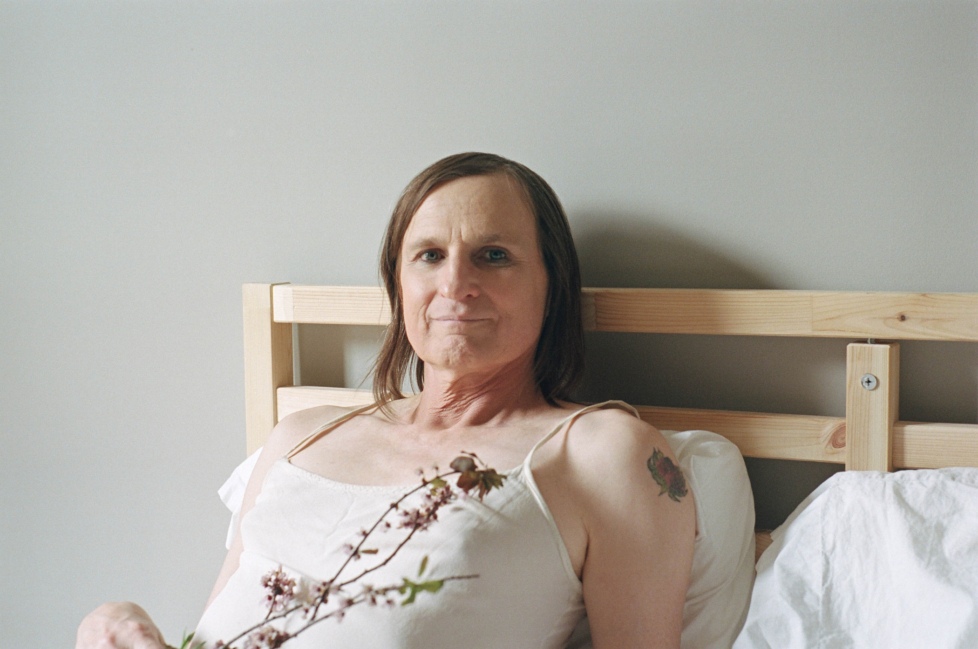
- portrait by Jessica Dunn Rovinelli
- Born: 1961 (age 64–65); Newcastle, New South Wales, Australia

Education
- Education: Murdoch University (PhD)

Philosophical work
- Era: Contemporary philosophy
- Region: Western philosophy
- School: Western Marxism; critical theory
- Institutions: The New School
- Main interests: Situationist International; avant-garde; contemporary art; materialism; hacktivism; tactical media; computer networks
- Notable ideas: Vectorialist class

McKenzie Wark (born 1961) is an Australian-born writer and scholar. Wark is known for her writings on media theory, critical theory, new media, and the Situationist International. Her best known works are A Hacker Manifesto and Gamer Theory. She is a professor of Media and Cultural Studies at The New School.

== Life ==
Wark was born in Newcastle, Australia in 1961. After her mother died in 1967, her father, architect Ross Kenneth Wark, raised her and her two older siblings. McKenzie received a bachelor's degree from Macquarie University in 1985, a Master's from the University of Technology, Sydney in 1990 and received a PhD in communications from Murdoch University in 1998.

In 1995, Wark had an affair with novelist Kathy Acker. Their email correspondence was published in the book I'm very into you (2007). In 1997, Wark met artist Christen Clifford in Williamsburg, New York. They married in 2000 and have two children together.

Wark is a trans woman. In 2017, Wark started her gender transition, and began taking hormones in 2018. Anticipating that hormone therapy might affect her ability to write, she took leave from the New School and completed the books Reverse Cowgirl, Philosophy for Spiders, Capital is Dead and Sensoria. Between 2018 and 2022, Wark primarily wrote articles and commissioned pieces, and became involved with queer and trans rave scenes in Brooklyn. In 2023, she published her first book since her leave of absence, Raving, a first-person account of raving.

== Work ==
In Virtual Geography, published in 1994, Wark offers a theory of what she calls the "weird global media event". Examples given in the book include the stock market crash of 1987, the Tiananmen square demonstrations of 1989 and the fall of the Berlin Wall in 1989. She argues that the emergence of a global media space – a virtual geography – made out of increasingly pervasive lines of communication – vectors – was emerging as a more chaotic space than globalisation theory usually maintains.

Much of Wark's early engagement in public debate occurred in the Australian post-Marxist quarterly Arena in the 1990s, through a number of articles and exchanges about the character of real abstraction, the meta-ideological character of post-structuralism, and the consequences of these issues for emancipatory social theory.

In two subsequent books, The Virtual Republic, published in 1997, and Celebrities, Culture and Cyberspace (1999), Wark turned her attention to the national cultural space of Australia. The first of these works examines the so-called 'culture wars' of the 1990s as symptomatic of struggles over the redefinition of Australian national identity and culture in an age of global media. The second of these 'Australian' books looked at the transformation of a social democratic idea of the 'popular' as a political idea into a more market-based and media-driven popular culture.

Both these studies grew out of Wark's experience as a public intellectual who participated in public controversies, mainly through her newspaper column in The Australian, a leading national daily. She developed an approach based on participant observation, but adapted to the media sphere.

She further describes the concept of "third nature" or telesthesia, where devices such as television and the telephone create a platform which we use to communicate to people over large distances and not just a machine that we learn to operate individually. This is described in her book The Virtual Republic:

While it may feel natural for some to inhabit this media-made world, I suspect there is a fundamental change here that has a lot of people just a bit spooked. It's no longer a case of making second nature out of nature, of building things and getting used to living in the world people build. I think it might be interesting to consider telesthesia to be something fundamentally different. What gets woven out of telegraph, telephone, television, telecommunications is not a second nature but what I call third nature.

Wark emigrated to the United States in 2000. With the Australian poet John Kinsella, Australian novelist Bernard Cohen and Australian memoirist Terri-Ann White, Wark co-wrote Speed Factory, an experimental work about distance and expatriation. The co-authors developed for this the speed factory writing technique, in which an author writes 300 words, emails it to the next author, who then has 24 hours to write the next 300 words.

Dispositions, another experimental work, followed. Wark travelled the world with a GPS device and recorded observations at particular times and coordinates. The media theorist Ned Rossiter has called this approach a 'micro-empiricism', and sees it as derived from the work of the philosopher Gilles Deleuze.

In 2004 Wark published her best known work, A Hacker Manifesto. Here Wark argues that the rise of intellectual property creates a new class division, between those who produce it, whom she calls the hacker class, and those who come to own it, the vectoralist class. Wark argues that these vectoralists have imposed the concept of property on all physical fields (thus having scarcity), but now the new vectoralists lay claim to intellectual property, a field that is not bound by scarcity. By the concept of intellectual property these vectoralists attempt to institute an imposed scarcity in an immaterial field. Wark argues that the vectoral class cannot control the intellectual (property) world itself, but only in its commodified form—not its overall application or use.

Gamer Theory combines Wark's interest in experimental writing techniques in networked media with her own developing media theory. Gamer Theory was first published by the Institute for the Future of the Book as a networked book with her own specially designed interface. In Gamer Theory Wark argues that in a world that is increasingly competitive and game-like, computer games are a utopian version of the world (itself an imperfect game), because they actually realise the principles of the level playing field and reward based on merit that is elsewhere promised but not actually delivered.

Wark's recent work explores the art, writing, and politics of the Situationist International (SI). In her book 50 Years of Recuperation of the Situationist International (the result of a lecture given at Columbia University), Wark examines the influences of Situationist aesthetics on contemporary art and activist movements, from tactical media to the anti-globalism movement. Wark pays particular attention to often-neglected figures and works in the SI, including the utopian architectural projects of Constant, the painting of Giuseppe Pinot, The Situationist Times of Jacqueline de Jong and the novels of Michèle Bernstein.

In 2013, Wark, along with Alexander Galloway and Eugene Thacker, published the book Excommunication: Three Inquiries in Media and Mediation. In the opening of the book the authors ask "Does everything that exists, exist to be presented and represented, to be mediated and remediated, to be communicated and translated? There are mediative situations in which heresy, exile, or banishment carry the day, not repetition, communion, or integration. There are certain kinds of messages that state 'there will be no more messages'. Hence for every communication there is a correlative excommunication." This approach has been referred to as the "New York School of Media Theory."

At The New School, Professor Wark teaches seminars on the Situationist International, the Militarized Vision lecture, as well as Introduction to Cultural Studies. Wark was an Eyebeam resident in 2007.

Reverse Cowgirl is an autofictional account of Wark's various experiences of gender and sexuality as she understood them on the cusp of her transition. Her autofictional account of her relationship with Kathy Acker, originally intended to be part of Reverse Cowgirl, became instead the start of Philosophy for Spiders: on the low theory of Kathy Acker. Wark's correspondence with Acker had been published in 2015 as I'm Very into You, which she described in the afterword to the German edition as a work of "accidental autofiction."

Molecular Red (2016) according to its subtitle, is a "theory for the Anthropocene." The first half of the book draws on the relatively neglected Marxism of Alexander Bogdanov, and which reads the work of Andrei Platonov as Marxist theory. Out of these Wark draws a theory and practice of Marxism as the applied knowledge of collaborative labor. The second half of the book applies this Bogdanovite lens to the work of Donna Haraway, Karen Barad, and Kim Stanley Robinson.

General Intellects (2017) and Sensoria (2020) collect Wark's essay on other theorists who, together, Wark thinks might enable a collaborative knowledge of the present moment, such that it might be transformed.

In 2019, McKenzie Wark's book Capital Is Dead: Is This Something Worse? was published from Verso. Building on her earlier book A Hacker Manifesto, Wark differentiates a vectoralist class from capitalists and landlords as a new ruling class gaining its power through the ownership and control of information.

In the epistolary Love and Money, Sex and Death, Wark writes to her deceased mother, her sister, and various lovers. This book, along with I'm Very into You and part of Raving, was intentionally written in the second person, which Wark considers to be enabling for trans literature. She writes that: "Addressing the text in the second person to and from specific people, real or imagined, gets us away from the omniscient narrator and allows us to explore how particular experiences and emotions fall outside both literary and social norms."

In her 2022 Document Journal essay “Mapping a modern trans bohemia in the borough of the flesh,” Wark chronicles her late-life transition and immersion into Brooklyn’s trans cultural scene, spotlighting artists, writers, and nightlife figures like Torrey Peters, Kay Gabriel, Macy Rodman, Hannah Baer, and Goth Jafar."

== Reception ==
At the theoretical level, Wark's writing can be seen in the context of three currents: British Cultural Studies, German Critical Theory and French Poststructuralism. Her earlier works combined British and French influences to extend Australian cultural studies to encompass questions of globalization and new media technology. Her later works draw more from Critical Theory and a much revised Marxism. Through her experimentation with new media forms, starting with listservers such as nettime.org and later with web interfaces such as the one developed for Gamer Theory, her works intersect with other new media theorists such as Geert Lovink and Mark Amerika.

Love and Money, Sex and Death was shortlisted for the 2024 Lambda Literary Award for Transgender Nonfiction.

== Bibliography ==
- Virtual Geography: Living With Global Media Events (Indiana University Press, 1994)
- The Virtual Republic: Australia's Culture wars of the 1990s (Allen & Unwin, 1997)
- Ray Edgar and Ashley Crawford (eds) Transit Lounge (Fine Art Publishing, 1998 – includes several of Wark's 21C essays).
- Celebrities, Culture and Cyberspace (Pluto Press Australia, 1999)
- Josephine Bosma et al. (eds), Readme! (Autonomedia, 1999)
- Dispositions (Salt Publishing, 2002)
- Speed Factory, with Bernard Cohen, John Kinsella and Terri-Ann White (Fremantle Arts Centre Press, 2002)
- A Hacker Manifesto (Harvard University Press, 2004; Spanish translation: Un Manifiesto Hacker, Alpha Decay, Barcelona, 2006)
- GAM3R 7H30RY (Institute for the Future of the Book, 2006 – Link)
- Gamer Theory (Harvard University Press, 2007)
- 50 Years of Recuperation of the Situationist International (Princeton Architectural Press, 2008)
- The Beach Beneath the Street: The Everyday Life and Glorious Times of the Situationist International (Verso, 2011)
- Telesthesia: Communication, Culture and Class (Polity, 2012)
- Excommunication: Three Inquiries in Media and Mediation (with Alexander R. Galloway and Eugene Thacker) (University of Chicago Press, 2013)
- The Spectacle of Disintegration (Verso, 2013)
- Molecular Red: Theory for the Anthropocene (Verso, 2015)
- I'm Very Into You: Correspondence 1995-1996, with Kathy Acker (Semiotexte 2015)
- General Intellects: Twenty-One Thinkers for the Twenty-First Century (Verso, 2017)
- Capital Is Dead: Is This Something Worse? (Verso, 2019)
- Reverse Cowgirl (Semiotext(e), 2020)
- Sensoria: Thinkers for the Twenty-first Century (Verso, 2020)
- Philosophy for Spiders: On the Low Theory of Kathy Acker (Duke University Press, 2021)
- Raving (Duke University Press 2023)
- Love and Money, Sex and Death (Verso Books 2023)
- Leaving the Twentieth Century: Situationist Revolutions (Verso Books 2024)

== See also ==
- Situationist International
- Guy Debord
- Raoul Vaneigem
- Constant Nieuwenhuys
- Jacqueline de Jong
- Michèle Bernstein
- Alexander R. Galloway
- Jussi Parikka
- Eugene Thacker
- Hacktivism
- Marshall McLuhan
