= Algorithmic culture =

Concept in the digital humanities

In the digital humanities, "algorithmic culture" is part of an emerging synthesis of rigorous, algorithm-driven software design that couples software and highly structured data-driven design with human-oriented sociocultural attributes. An early use of the term appears in Alexander R. Galloway's classic Gaming: Essays on Algorithmic Culture.

Other definitions include Ted Striphas' work, where algorithmic culture refers to how the logic of big data and large-scale computation (including algorithms) alters how culture is practiced, experienced, and understood. Diggit Magazine offers another perspective, describing algorithmic culture as the influence of computational processes on cultural practices.

Edward Burnett Tylor is often credited with modern discussion of culture in his 1871 work on primitive culture.

The emergence and continuing development and convergence of computers, software, algorithms, human psychology, digital marketing and other computational technologies resulted in numerous AC variants, including recommendation algorithms, AI-generated stories and characters, digital assets (including creative NFTs, all of which can and should be considered as algorithmic culture artifacts. A similar process is occurring in strictly sociological interactions.

== Contemporary scholarship ==
Recent research further expands the concept of algorithmic culture by emphasising how cultural participation is shaped by algorithmic systems across social media platforms. Gillespie (2014) argues that algorithms act as “gatekeepers of visibility”, determining which ideas, identities, and cultural practices become amplified or obscured.

Bucher (2018) similarly highlights that recommendations and filtered feeds produce new forms of affective governance, as users come to understand themselves through what platforms choose to show them.

Van Dijck, Poell, and De Waal (2018) add that algorithmic culture plays a central role in “platform society”, where public values and cultural practices are increasingly mediated through commercial data infrastructures.

Together, this scholarship highlights that algorithmic culture is not only about automated decision-making, but also about how platforms reorganise cultural production, user behaviour, and everyday meaning-making.

== Algorithmic Culture and ChatGPT ==
With the rise of LLMs, particularly ChatGPT, algorithmic culture is increasingly visible in the academic mainstream. Jill Walker Rettberg at the University of Bergen is exploring applications in her work. Some of the examples she uses are: How to use ChatGPT to get past writer's block, and examining society's biases and clichés.

Generative AI has become a widely discussed part of contemporay algorithmic art and visual culture. Text-to-image systems such as Midjourney, DALL-E, and Stable Diffusion, all released to the public in 2022, allow users to generate images from written prompts and were rapidly adopted by both amateurs and professionals. That year, an image created with Midjournet, Théâtre D'opéra Spatial, won first prize in the digital art category of the Colorado State Fair's fine arts competition, prompting debate about the status of AI-generated work.

ChatGPT Plus and GPT-4 are becoming more sophisticated at composing music, writing teleplays, fairy tales, stories, and poems. User prompting is also facilitating character-specific speaking and writing styles. NovelAI, for example, is an online AI-assisted story writer.

== Bibliography ==
- Jonathan Cohn, The burden of choice: Recommendations, subversion, and algorithmic culture, Rutgers University Press, 2019
- Fernández Rovira Cristina and Santiago Giraldo Luque. Predictive Technology in Social Media. First edition First ed. CRC Press
- Eran Fisher, Algorithms and Subjectivity: The Subversion of Critical Knowledge. First edition First ed. Routledge 2021
- Gary Hall . Culture in Bits : The Monstrous Future of Theory. Continuum 2002
- Hallinan B and Striphas T (2014) Recommend for you:The Netflix Prize and the production of algorithmic culture. New Media & Society. Epub ahead of print 23 June 2014.
- Levy, S. (February 2010). "Exclusive: How Google's Algorithm Rules the Web". Wired.
