= August Heat (short story) =

- Short story by W. F. Harvey
- Genres: Horror, mystery

Publication
- Published in: Midnight House and Other Tales
- Publisher: J. M. Dent
- Publication date: 1910

"August Heat" is a 1910 short story by W. F. Harvey, about two men, unknown to each other, whose look at the other's possible future suggests that one of them will be murdered and the other will be the murderer. It was first published in Harvey's book Midnight House and Other Tales. It is often referred to as a ghost story (it appears in The Folio Society's Book of Ghost Stories, for example, and in Edward Gorey's ghost story collection The Haunted Looking Glass) even though no ghosts are featured.

== Synopsis ==
On a scorching August day, artist James Clarence Withencroft draws a sketch of a criminal in the dock immediately after the judge has given him a sentence. That evening, Withencroft goes for a walk and wanders into the workshop of a stonemason, Charles Atkinson. To his surprise, Atkinson exactly resembles the criminal in the sketch he is carrying in his pocket. Both men are shocked to discover that the model headstone Atkinson has just finished carving bears Withencroft's full name, his date of birth, and that very day as the date of his death.

The two men are unnerved and agree that, for the sake of safety, Withencroft should stay at Atkinson's place until midnight has passed and the date changed. The story ends with Withencroft writing the day's events as Atkinson sharpens some tools: "It is after eleven now. I shall be gone in less than an hour. But the heat is stifling. It is enough to send a man mad."

== Adaptations ==
The story has been adapted for radio four times: twice for the radio series Suspense in an adaptation by Mel Dinelli and produced/directed by William Spier on 31 May 1945, starring Ronald Colman as Withencroft and Dennis Hoey as Atkinson, and on 20 March 1948, with Barry Kroeger as Withencroft and Dennis Hoey again as Atkinson; for the Hallmark Playhouse on 29 August 1949, adapted by John Gay, directed by Jack Rubin and starring Fred MacMurray as Withencroft and Ed Begley as Atkinson; and for Sleep No More on 28 November 1956, with Nelson Olmsted reading an abridged version of the story.

Adaptations on television included:

- Danger - September 26, 1950
- On Camera - January 8, 1955 with Patrick Macnee
- Great Ghost Tales - August 3, 1961, with James Broderick and Vincent Gardenia.

A comic book adaptation of "August Heat" appeared in Secrets of Sinister House #12 (July 1973), published by DC Comics with E. Nelson Bridwell adapting the story and Alfredo Alcala illustrating; this was reprinted in the 2010 trade paperback collection.
