= Clayton Hamilton (critic) =

American drama critic

Clayton Meeker Hamilton (November 14, 1881 – September 17, 1946) was an American drama critic.

== Early years ==
Born in Brooklyn, N. Y., Hamilton was the son of George Alexander Hamilton and Susie Ameila Corey Hamilton. He graduated from the Polytechnic Institute of Brooklyn in 1900 and from Columbia University (M. A.) in 1901.

== Career ==
He was extension lecturer on the drama at Columbia University after 1903, and lectured in other connections. He served as dramatic critic and associate editor of the Forum in 1907–09, and as dramatic editor of the Bookman after 1910, of Everybody's Magazine after 1911, and of Vogue after 1912. He was elected a member of The National Institute of Arts and Letters. He edited Stevenson's Treasure Island for "Longman's English Classics" in 1910; contributed to the New International Encyclopedia and is author of Love That Blinds (1906), with Grace Isabel Colbron; Materials and Methods of Fiction (1908); The Theory of the Theatre (1910); The Stranger at the Inn (1913); Studies in Stagecraft (1914); and, with A. E. Thomas, a play, The Big Idea (1914).

In 1945, Hamilton was the host and narrator on Brownstone Theater, a dramatic anthology radio series on the Mutual Broadcasting System.

== Personal life ==
In 1913, Hamilton married Gladys Coates. They had two children.

== Death ==
Hamilton died of a heart attack in New York on September 17, 1946. He was survived by his wife and sons Gordon C. Hamilton and Donald C. Hamilton.

== Papers ==
The New York Public Library is home to the Clayton Meeker Hamilton papers, which include "his correspondence (personal and professional), diaries, lectures, plays, poetry, speeches, contracts and miscellaneous papers from 1899-1946."

== Public domain works available ==
- Problems of the actor. With an introd. by Clayton Hamilton (1918)
- A thousand years ago; a romance of the Orient, with an introd. by Clayton Hamilton (1914)
- The Theory of the Theatre
- Problems of the Playwright (1917)
- Studies in stagecraft (1914)
- Materials and methods of fiction (1908)
- Seen on the stage (1920)
