= John Silence =

Short story collection by Algernon Blackwood

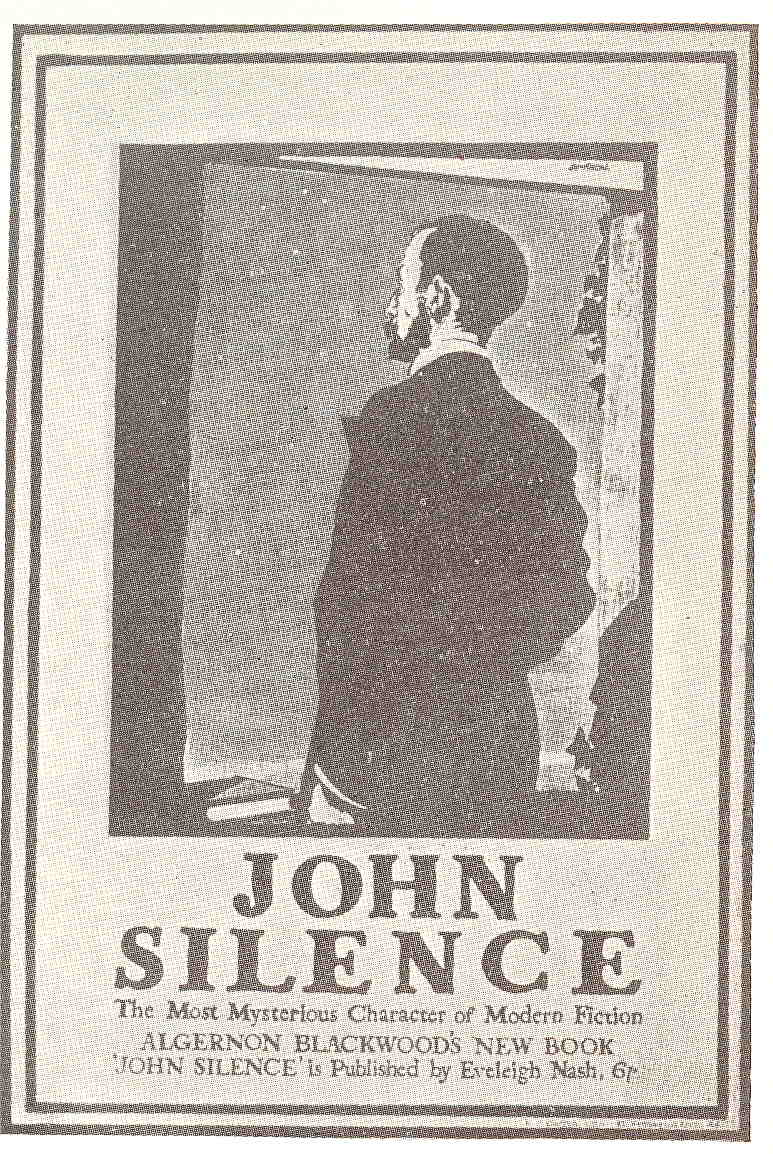
- Author: Algernon Blackwood
- Language: English
- Genre: Supernatural fiction
- Publication date: 1908
- Publication place: United Kingdom

John Silence (also known as John Silence: Physician Extraordinary) is a collection of supernatural short stories by English journalist and author Algernon Blackwood, first published in 1908. They are considered early examples of the occult detective subgenre, and went on to greatly influence other characters such as William Hope Hodgson's better known Carnacki.

Michael Dirda suggests that the character Jim Shorthouse, who appears in several stories in Blackwood's 1906 book The Empty House and Other Ghost Stories, including "The Strange Adventures of a Private Secretary in New York", is a precursor to John Silence.

== Contents ==
Silence is a physician who, thanks to his independent wealth, takes his cases free of charge. Having undergone psychic training, he investigates matters rooted in supernatural causes.

The book originally contained the following stories:

1. "A Psychical Invasion"
2. "Ancient Sorceries"
3. "The Nemesis of Fire"
4. "Secret Worship"
5. "The Camp of the Dog"

Some recent editions also include "A Victim of Higher Space" – an additional John Silence story that was first published in The Occult Review in 1914, and later included in Blackwood's anthology Day and Night Stories (1917).

== Adaptations ==
=== Film ===
"Ancient Sorceries" served as partial inspiration for the classic horror film Cat People (1942).

=== Television ===
"Ancient Sorceries" was adapted as the sixth episode of series two of Tales of Mystery, an ITV anthology series adapting Blackwood's stories. Broadcast on 8 August 1962, the episode did not feature the character of Silence.

=== Radio and audio ===
The CBS anthology series Escape adapted "Ancient Sorceries". Two broadcasts were aired in February 1948 for the east and west coasts, featuring Kay Brinker, Jeff Corey, Paul Frees, and Ann Morrison. Silence did not appear.

Four John Silence stories were dramatised by Sheila Hodgson for BBC Radio 4 from August 1974 to October 1975: "The Camp of the Dog", "The Nemesis of Fire", "Secret Worship", and "The Empty Sleeve" (based on one of Blackwood's short stories that did not include John Silence). All starred Malcolm Hayes as Silence.

"Ancient Sorceries" was read unabridged in four parts by Philip Madoc for BBC 7 and broadcast in September 2005.

"Ancient Sorceries" was abridged and adapted by Fiona McAlpine and read by Hugh Ross for BBC Radio 4. It was broadcast in August 2006 as part of the Algernon Blackwood's Ghost Stories series. It did not include John Silence.

All of the stories have been recorded at LibriVox, some several times: "A Psychical Invasion" (2010, 2013), "Ancient Sorceries" (2013), "The Nemesis of Fire" (2013), "Secret Worship" (2013, 2021), "The Camp of the Dog" (2007, 2013, 2021), and "A Victim of Higher Space" (2013, 2014, 2017, 2021).
