= The Strange Adventures of a Private Secretary in New York =

Short story by Algernon Blackwood

- Short story by Algernon Blackwood
- The front cover of The Empty House and Other Ghost Stories

Text available at Wikisource
- Country: United Kingdom
- Language: English
- Genre: Horror short story

Publication
- Published in: The Empty House and Other Ghost Stories
- Media type: Print
- Publication date: 1906

"The Strange Adventures of a Private Secretary in New York" is a short story by English writer Algernon Blackwood, first published in his 1906 book The Empty House and Other Ghost Stories.

== Plot summary ==
Jim Shorthouse is the private secretary of New York City businessman Jonas B. Sidebotham. Sidebotham is the former Chicago business partner of Joel Garvey; Sidebotham and Garvey are "still to some extent in the other's power" and "each wished most devoutly that the other would die". One morning, Sidebotham informs Shorthouse that he is being blackmailed by Garvey, and asks him to take "valuable papers" to Garvey's house in "the remote part of Long Island" so that Garvey can remove his signature from them. Sidebotham warns Shorthouse that the summons is a ruse, and that Garvey intends to try and steal the papers themselves. Sidebotham further warns that Garvey is "occasionally of unsound mind", and lends Shorthouse a revolver.

Late that afternoon, Shorthouse takes a train from Brooklyn to Long Island, followed by a six-mile buggy ride to Garvey's remote, decrepit house; the buggy driver refuses to wait for him, or to approach the house closely. As a precaution against theft, Shorthouse has made up a decoy packet of papers. He is shown into Garvey's library by Garvey's cassock-wearing servant, Marx, who he finds "strangely repulsive". Sometime later, he is joined by Garvey, who explains that he was delayed due to carrying out a chemistry experiment. Garvey leaves the room once again; Sidebotham considers checking the false papers, but decides not to after his intuition tells him he is being watched. Garvey returns and cuts his signature out of the papers; as he burns the scraps of paper, Shorthouse surreptitiously puts the false papers in his bag and hides the real papers in his pocket.

As Shorthouse makes to leave, he realises that the library clock is half an hour slow and that he has no chance of catching the last train of the evening. He reluctancy agrees to spend the night in Garvey's house. During dinner, Shorthouse observes that "Garvey's quiet self-possession was giving place to a degree of suppressed excitement that seemed so far inexplicable [...] Something unwonted was stirring within him and evidently demanding every moment more vigorous manifestation as the meal proceeded." Garvey mysteriously remarks that Marx "...has a horrible predilection for vacuums [...] he's always tumbling into them, so that I can't find him or get at him." During the meal, Garvey eats only raw fresh meat; watching him eat animalistically, Shorthouse "knew at last that he was sitting face to face with a madman". While drinking coffee in the library, Shorthouse is further unnerved when Garvey discusses his cravings for raw meat, including an occasion when he devoured his own pet spaniel.

Shorthouse is shown to a bedroom on the first floor of the house; locking the door and searching the room, he resolves to remain awake all night. During the night, an unseen figure peers through the keyhole; Shorthouse bangs his hand on the door, frightening the figure away; he seems to hear "four feet instead of two". At the same time, he spots another figure watching him through the bedroom window. Searching the balcony, Shorthouse sees a rope being withdrawn from a window on the floor above. By three o'clock in the morning, Shorthouse is exhausted, and decides to sleep after all. He awakes shortly thereafter to find the door unlocked and open. Hiding in the darkness, he hears an unseen figure enter the room and approach the fireplace, followed by a sliding sound. Lighting a match, he finds the room empty once more.

At four o'clock in the morning, Shorthouse notices eyes looking through the eyeholes of a portrait of a hunter; breaking the panel on which the portrait is painted, he drags Marx into the bedroom. As he confronts Marx, Garvey bursts into the room from the window, saying "That's where your vacuum is, is it? I know your vile hiding-place at last." As Garvey and Marx grapple, Shorthouse retreats from the room, slamming the bedroom door from the outside before they can react. Hiding at the foot of the stairs, he waits for Garvey and Marx to pass him, then returns to the bedroom, drops from the balcony into the snow below, and flees the house.

The story concludes with Sidebotham raising Shorthouse's salary and buying him a new hat and overcoat to replace the ones left behind.

== Publication ==
"The Strange Adventures of a Private Secretary in New York" was originally published in Blackwood's 1906 book The Empty House and Other Ghost Stories. It has since been anthologised many times, including in The Third Pan Book of Horror Stories in 1962.

== Reception ==
Reviewing The Empty House and Other Ghost Stories in 1907, The Spectator wrote "'The Strange Adventures of a Private Secretary in New York' is the most blood-curdling thing in the book; but here Mr. Blackwood descends from the psychic plane, and relies unduly, to our way of thinking, on repulsive details."

Describing "The Strange Adventures of a Private Secretary in New York" as "grotesque silliness", Jack Sullivan writes, "Blackwood's humor is more closely akin to Le Fanu than to M. R. James. Lacking James's understated wit, Blackwood relies on outright farce."

David Pringle describes "The Strange Adventures of a Private Secretary in New York" as "very untypical of Blackwood's work", writing that it "...betrays a heavy gothic influence in portraying its narrator's experiences in a remote rambling old house".

S. T. Joshi suggests that the story was inspired by "...the grinding poverty [Blackwood] experienced as a cub reporter in New York in the 1890s."

Michael Dirda describes "The Strange Adventures of a Private Secretary in New York" as "...a deliciously kitschy visit to a werewolf", and suggests that Shorthouse is a precursor to Blackwood's later character John Silence.
