= A Mix-up in the Gallery =

- Directed by: Georges Méliès
- Starring: Georges Méliès
- Production company: Star Film Company
- Release date: 1906
- Running time: 55 meters
- Country: France
- Language: Silent

A Mix-up in the Gallery (French: Une chute de cinq étages) is a 1906 French short silent comedy film directed by Georges Méliès.

== Production ==
Méliès, acting in a wig and false beard, appears in the film as the photographer.

The photography studio set, constructed from a painted backdrop and a wooden flat, closely reproduces the typical architecture of a contemporary photographer's studio; Méliès had drawn upon many elements of this architecture, including the use of a shuttered glass ceiling, in designing his film studio. The small statue of a dancer had previously been used in his 1904 film The Ballet-Master's Dream, while the lamppost prop was recycled from his 1905 film Unexpected Fireworks. The posters on the outside wall, ostensibly campaigning for political candidates, are in fact private jokes: the candidates' names are given as "Claudel", the name of Méliès's set painter; "L. Micho", i.e. Méliès's cameraman Michaut; and "Salmon", the name of an actor at Méliès's studio.

Close watching of the scene when the camera falls reveals that the prop camera had difficulty fitting through the window: Méliès, in character as the photographer, had to push it. Substitution splices are also in evidence in the film.

== Themes ==
Méliès's characterization of his role reflects a common depiction of professional photographers as mercenary salespeople. The janitor "becoming" a bull is the comic centerpiece of the film, with the staging of the scene designed to parody a bullfight. The chain-reaction of the fall itself also contributes to the comic nature of the film.

With its juxtaposition of artificiality (in the photographer's posed shots) and realism (in the urban action outside), culminating in the comic bullfight in which the two are inextricably blended, the film may be a satirical comment on the naturalistic actuality films made by the Lumière brothers and other early filmmakers. Méliès himself made many actuality films early in his career—all told, 93 films, or 18% of his output, were filmed as actuality material—but he gradually abandoned the genre in favor of more innovative fiction-based films.

== Release and reception ==
A Mix-up in the Gallery was released by Méliès's Star Film Company and is numbered 789–790 in its catalogues. The film was deposited at the Library of Congress for American copyright on 21 February 1906.

Brian Jacobson, in a study of early film studio architecture, argues that the film displays a "canny awareness of the changing qualities of modern spaces and materials", including a mise en abyme in which the photography studio stands in for Méliès's own film studio.
