= The Willows (story) =

- Short story by Algernon Blackwood

Text available at Wikisource
- Country: England
- Language: English
- Genres: Horror, weird fiction, novella

Publication
- Publication date: 1907

"The Willows" is a novella by English author Algernon Blackwood, originally published as part of his 1907 collection The Listener and Other Stories. It is one of Blackwood's best known works and has been influential on a number of later writers. Horror author H.P. Lovecraft considered it to be the finest supernatural tale in English literature. "The Willows" is an example of early modern horror and is connected within the literary tradition of weird fiction.

== Plot summary ==
Two friends are midway on a canoe trip down the River Danube. Throughout the story, Blackwood personifies the surrounding environment—river, sun, wind—with powerful and ultimately threatening characteristics. Most ominous are the masses of dense, desultory, menacing willows, which "moved of their own will as though alive, and they touched, by some incalculable method, my own keen sense of the horrible". His friend, known only as "the Swede," is early on characterized as being solid, pragmatic and not at all fanciful, a fact which makes it more chilling when later he is able to clearly perceive supernatural danger.

Shortly after landing their canoe for the evening on a sandy island near Bratislava in the Dunajské luhy Protected Landscape Area of Austria-Hungary, the narrator reflects on the river's potency, human qualities, and his own will:

Sleepy at first, but later developing violent desires as it became conscious of its deep soul, it rolled, like some huge fluid being, through all the countries we had passed, holding our little craft on its mighty shoulders, playing roughly with us sometimes, yet always friendly and well-meaning, till at length we had come inevitably to regard it as a Great Personage.

Blackwood also specifically characterizes the silvery, windblown willows as sinister:

And, apart quite from the elements, the willows connected themselves subtly with my malaise, attacking the mind insidiously somehow by reason of their vast numbers, and contriving in some way or other to represent to the imagination a new and mighty power, a power, moreover, not altogether friendly to us.

At one point, the two men see a traveler in his "flat-bottomed boat". However, the man appears to be warning them and ultimately appears to cross himself before hurtling forward on the river, out of sight. During the night, mysterious forces emerge from within the forest, including terrifying huge dark shapes launching from the willow branches upward into the sky, tapping sounds outside their tent, shifting gong-like noises, bizarre shadows, a feeling that the atmosphere has grown heavy and is crushing them, and the appearance that the willows have menacingly changed position, crowding toward the tent. In the morning, the two realize that one of their paddles is missing, a slit in the canoe needs repair, and some of their food has disappeared. A hint of distrust arises between them. The howling wind dies down on the second day, and a humming calm ensues. During the second night, the Swede attempts to hurl himself into the river as a "sacrifice". However, he is saved by the narrator. The next morning, the Swede claims that the mysterious forces have found another sacrifice which may save them. They discover the corpse of a peasant lodged in roots near the shore. When they touch the body, a flurry of living presence seems to rise from it and disappear into the sky. Later, they see the body is pockmarked with funnel shapes similar to the ones viewed across the island's coastline during their experience. These are "Their awful mark!" the Swede says. The body is swept away, resembling an "otter" they thought they had seen just before camping the previous day, and the story ends.

== Analysis ==
The precise nature of the mysterious entities in "The Willows" is unclear, and they appear at times malevolent or treacherous, while at times simply mystical and almost divine: "a new order of experience, and in the true sense of the word unearthly", and a world "where great things go on unceasingly...vast purposes...that deal directly with the soul, and not indirectly with mere expressions of the soul". These forces are often contrasted with the natural beauty of the area, itself a vigorous dynamic. Overall, the story suggests that the landscape is actually an intersection, a point of contact with a "fourth dimension" — "on the frontier of another world, an alien world, a world tenanted by willows only and the souls of willows". The story includes the concept of an alternate universe which, at a specific place and time, coincides with our own; including the notion of a boundary between worlds growing thin and allowing a bleed-through of forces or beings. This trope has often been used since, in both fantasy and horror fiction.

== Reception and influence ==
- Grace Isabel Colbron, in her 1915 essay, "Algernon Blackwood: An Appreciation", stated: "For sheer naked concentrated horror, unexplained and unexplainable, such tales as..."The Willows" may be said to lead among the stories of the supernatural".
- "The Willows" was the personal favorite story of H. P. Lovecraft, who wrote in his 1927 treatise "Supernatural Horror in Literature", "Here art and restraint in narrative reach their very highest development, and an impression of lasting poignancy is produced without a single strained passage or a single false note".
- The horror historian Robert S. Hadji included "The Willows" on his 1983 list of the most frightening horror stories.
- The plot of Caitlín R. Kiernan's novel Threshold (2001) drew upon "The Willows," which was quoted several times in the book.
- The Willows, a now-defunct American magazine founded in 2007 that specialized in steampunk horror, Neo-Victorian short stories and poetry, was named after Blackwood's tale.
- In Richard Stanley’s adaptation of "The Color Out Of Space", the character of Ward Philips is seen reading a copy of "The Willows".
- T. Kingfisher's 2020 novel, The Hollow Places, is a contemporary interpretation of the evil presence depicted in The Willows.

== Adaptation ==
An audio drama based on the story was broadcast on BBC Radio 4 in December 2022. The adaptation was by Stef Penney and starred Bill Pullman and Julian Sands.
