= Peter Penzoldt =

American journalist

Peter Penzoldt (18 January 1925 in Munich – 21 August 1969 in Geneva) was the author of The Supernatural in Fiction (1952), a major critical study of the weird tale.

The Supernatural in Fiction is an expansion of Penzoldt's doctoral thesis, which was submitted to the University of Geneva when he was twenty-four. Published on the recommendation of Algernon Blackwood, whom Penzoldt met in 1949, it contains chapters on the structure of supernatural tales, on various motifs such as the ghost, the vampire, the werewolf, the witch, on the relationship of the supernatural tale to science fiction, and on the "psychological ghost story".

There are also individual chapters on Joseph Sheridan Le Fanu, Rudyard Kipling, M. R. James, Walter de la Mare, and Algernon Blackwood, to whom the book is dedicated.

Penzoldt was the son of Sigrid Onegin from her second marriage with Fritz Penzoldt.
