= Dark media =

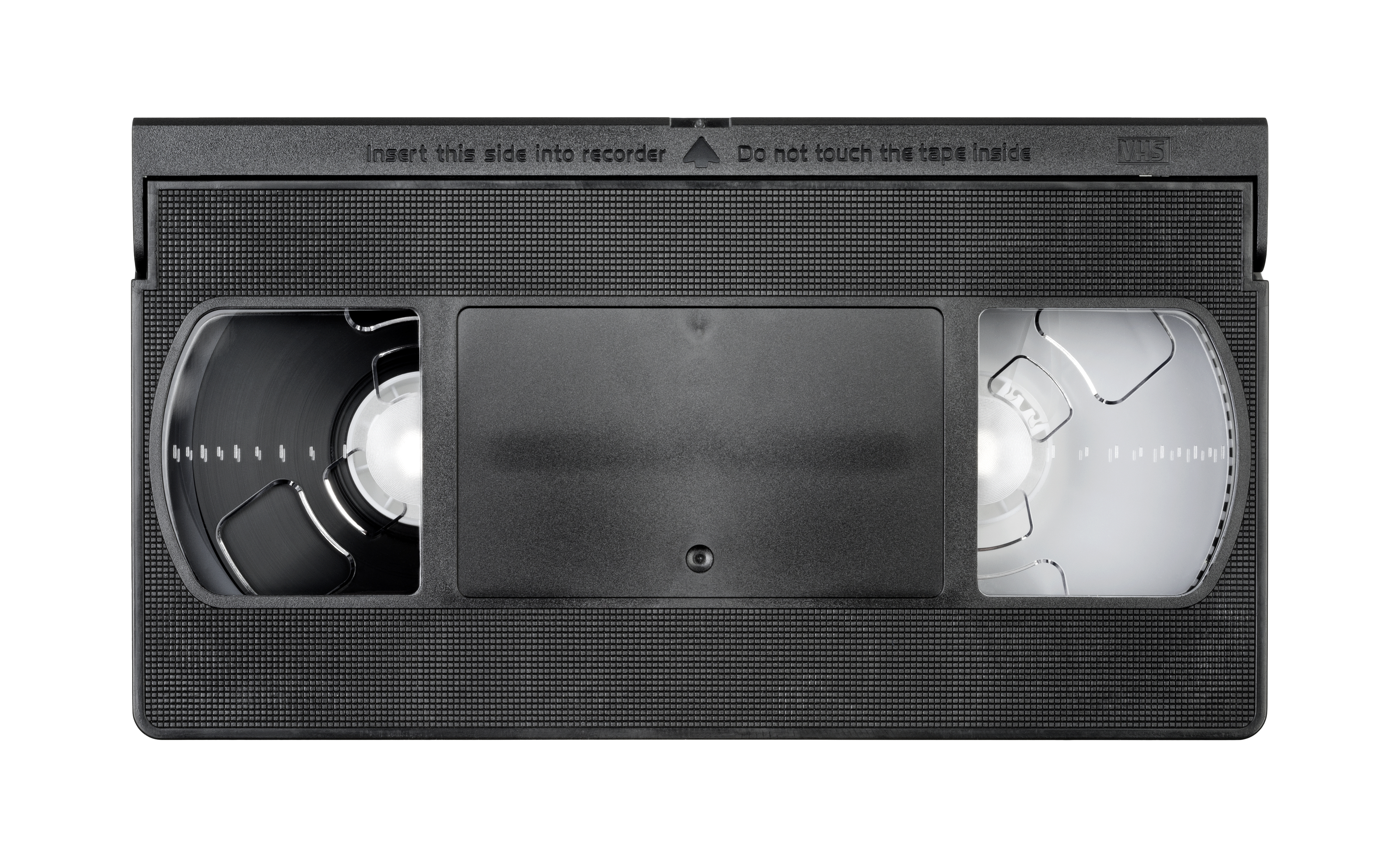
The VHS cassette in the Japanese horror film Ring is an example of a dark medium.

Dark media are a type of media outlined by American philosopher Eugene Thacker to describe technologies that mediate between the natural and supernatural, most commonly found in the horror genre.

== Overview ==
Discussed at length in the essay of the same name, Eugene Thacker writes that dark media are media that function too well. Thacker writes that, "dark media have, as their aim, the mediation of that which is unavailable or inaccessible to the senses, and thus that which we are normally "in the dark" about."

== Characteristics ==
Typically in works of Horror, dark media are relatively commonplace media that show more of the world than is expected, with the dark medium showing what lies beyond the possibility of human sense. Dark media are significant in their ability to breach the, typically unbridgeable, gap between objects being mediated.

Referencing the philosophies of religion in Augustine, Immanuel Kant, William James, and Georges Bataille, Thacker shows how dark media blur the boundary between the natural and supernatural, and bear comparison to accounts of mystical experience. Thacker references the work of François Laruelle's "non-philosophy" and Siegfried Zielinski's media archaeology to show how dark media point to the limits of human perception and knowledge. With dark media, as shown in the J-Horror film Ring, dark media can create a point between the natural and the supernatural. In Ring, the dark medium of the VHS cassette makes it possible for antagonist Sadako Yamamura to cross the threshold of a TV, and subsequently kill those that have viewed the videotape.

== Examples ==
Thacker's examples include the films of Georges Méliès and collage filmmaker Peter Tscherkassky, J-horror film directors like Kiyoshi Kurosawa, the avant-garde films of Kenneth Anger and the giallo films of Dario Argento, The Twilight Zone TV series, and the "occult detective" writing linked to the Society for Psychical Research and authors such as William Hope Hodgson, Algernon Blackwood, and Sheridan Le Fanu. Further examples of dark media are found in Thacker's book In the Dust of This Planet.

The 1941 Edward Dmytryk science fiction film The Devil Commands is also considered an example of "dark media".

== See also ==
- Techno-horror
- Technophobia
- Analog horror
