= Brigflatts Meeting House =

Quaker meeting house in Cumbria, England

Coordinates: 54.31470°N 2.55354°W

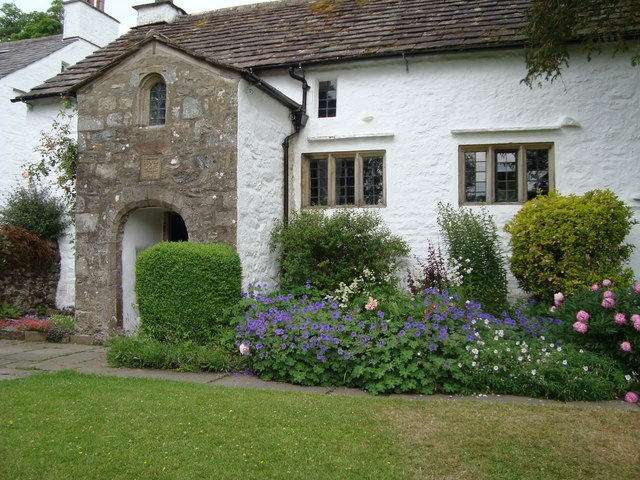
Brigflatts Meeting House

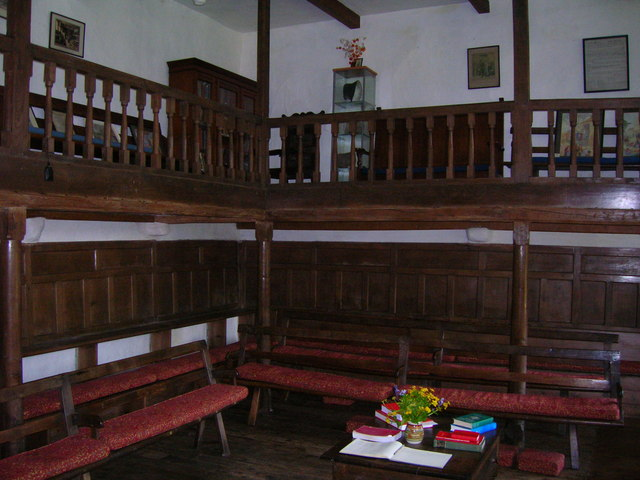
Interior

Brigflatts Meeting House or Briggflatts Meeting House is a Friends Meeting House of the Religious Society of Friends (Quakers), near Sedbergh, Cumbria, in north-western England. Built in 1675, it is the second oldest Friends Meeting House in England. It has been listed Grade I on the National Heritage List for England since March 1954. It is the subject of a twelve-line poem titled "At Briggflatts meetinghouse" by British modernist poet Basil Bunting. Bunting's poem was written in 1975 for the 300th anniversary of the meeting house's construction.

Throughout its history, the spelling has varied from Brigflatts, Brigflats, Briggflats, or Briggflatts, for both the village and the Quaker Meeting. Currently, the Quaker Meeting uses the spelling "Brigflatts". The variant spelling with two g's and two t's was used by Bunting for his two poems, "At Briggflatts Meetinghouse" (1975) and the earlier autobiographical long poem Briggflatts (1965).

The Meeting House "Howgills" in Letchworth Garden City in Hertfordshire is based on Brigflatts.
