= Alexander R. Galloway =

American academic

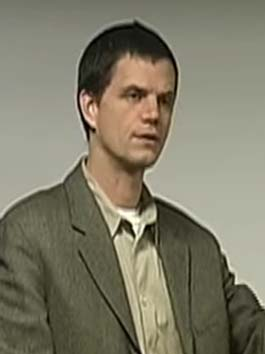
- Born: 1974 (age 51–52)

Education
- Education: Brown University (B.A.); Duke University (Ph.D.)

Philosophical work
- Era: Contemporary philosophy
- Region: Western philosophy
- School: Continental philosophy Speculative realism
- Institutions: New York University
- Main interests: Aesthetics, computer networks, media studies, film studies, game studies, digital media, Internet art, software art, conceptual art

Alexander R. Galloway (born 1974) is an American author and professor in the Department of Media, Culture, and Communication at New York University.

== Education ==
Galloway has a bachelor's degree in Modern Culture and Media from Brown University and earned a Ph.D. in literature from Duke University in 2001. Galloway is known for his writings on philosophy, media theory, contemporary art, film, and video games.

== Work ==
Galloway's first book, Protocol: How Control Exists After Decentralization, is a study of information networks and their political and computational effects. It identifies protocols like TCP/IP and HTTP as means of control that govern people's interactions with the Internet. His other published writings examine film noir, video games, software art, hacktivism, and digital aesthetics. Galloway has conducted several seminars through The Public School NYC, including "French Theory Today", and translated the work of philosopher François Laruelle and the Tiqqun collective.

Galloway is also a programmer and artist. He is a founding member of the Radical Software Group (RSG), and his art projects include Carnivore (awarded a Golden Nica prize at Ars Electronica 2002), and Kriegspiel (based on a war game originally designed by Guy Debord). Galloway was an Eyebeam Honorary Resident and later became a member of their Advisory Council.

In 2013 Galloway, along with Eugene Thacker and McKenzie Wark, published the book Excommunication: Three Inquiries in Media and Mediation. This approach has been referred to as the "New York School of Media Theory".

== Bibliography ==
- Protocol: How Control Exists After Decentralization, MIT Press, 2004. ISBN 0-262-07247-5
- Gaming: Essays on Algorithmic Culture, University of Minnesota Press, 2006. ISBN 0-8166-4851-4
- The Exploit: A Theory of Networks, coauthored with Eugene Thacker. University of Minnesota Press, 2007. ISBN 978-0-8166-5044-6
- French Theory Today — An Introduction to Possible Futures, The Public School New York, 2010. ISBN 978-2756104126 (translated into French by Clémentine Duzer and Thomas Duzer as Les Nouveaux Réalistes - Philosophie et Postfordisme, Editions Léo Scheer, 2012)
- The Interface Effect, Polity Books, 2012. ISBN 978-0-7456-6252-7
- Dark Nights of the Universe (with Eugene Thacker, Daniel Coluciello Barber, and Nicola Masciandaro) ([NAME] Publications, 2013). ISBN 978-0-9840566-7-5
- Excommunication: Three Inquiries in Media and Mediation (with Eugene Thacker and McKenzie Wark) (University of Chicago Press, 2013). ISBN 978-0226925226
- Laruelle: Against the Digital (University of Minnesota Press, 2014). ISBN 978-0816692132
- Uncomputable: Play and Politics in the Long Digital Age, Verso, 2021

== See also ==
- Internet art
