= The Ballet-Master's Dream =

- Directed by: Georges Méliès
- Starring: Georges Méliès; Zizi Papillon
- Production company: Star Film Company
- Release date: 1903
- Country: France
- Language: Silent

Le Rêve du maître de ballet, sold in the United States as The Ballet-Master's Dream and in Britain as The Dream of the Ballet Master, is a 1903 French silent trick film by Georges Méliès. It was sold by Méliès's Star Film Company and is numbered 525–526 in its catalogues.

Méliès plays the ballet master; the American catalogue description credits Zizi Papillon as the eccentric dancer. Papillon was a stage performer featured at the Folies Bergère and at the Casino de Paris. The special effects are created using substitution splices, multiple exposures, and dissolves.

A paper print of the film survives at the Library of Congress.
