= Church of St Mary, Letchworth =

Church in Hertfordshire, England

Coordinates: 51.9634°N 0.2293°W

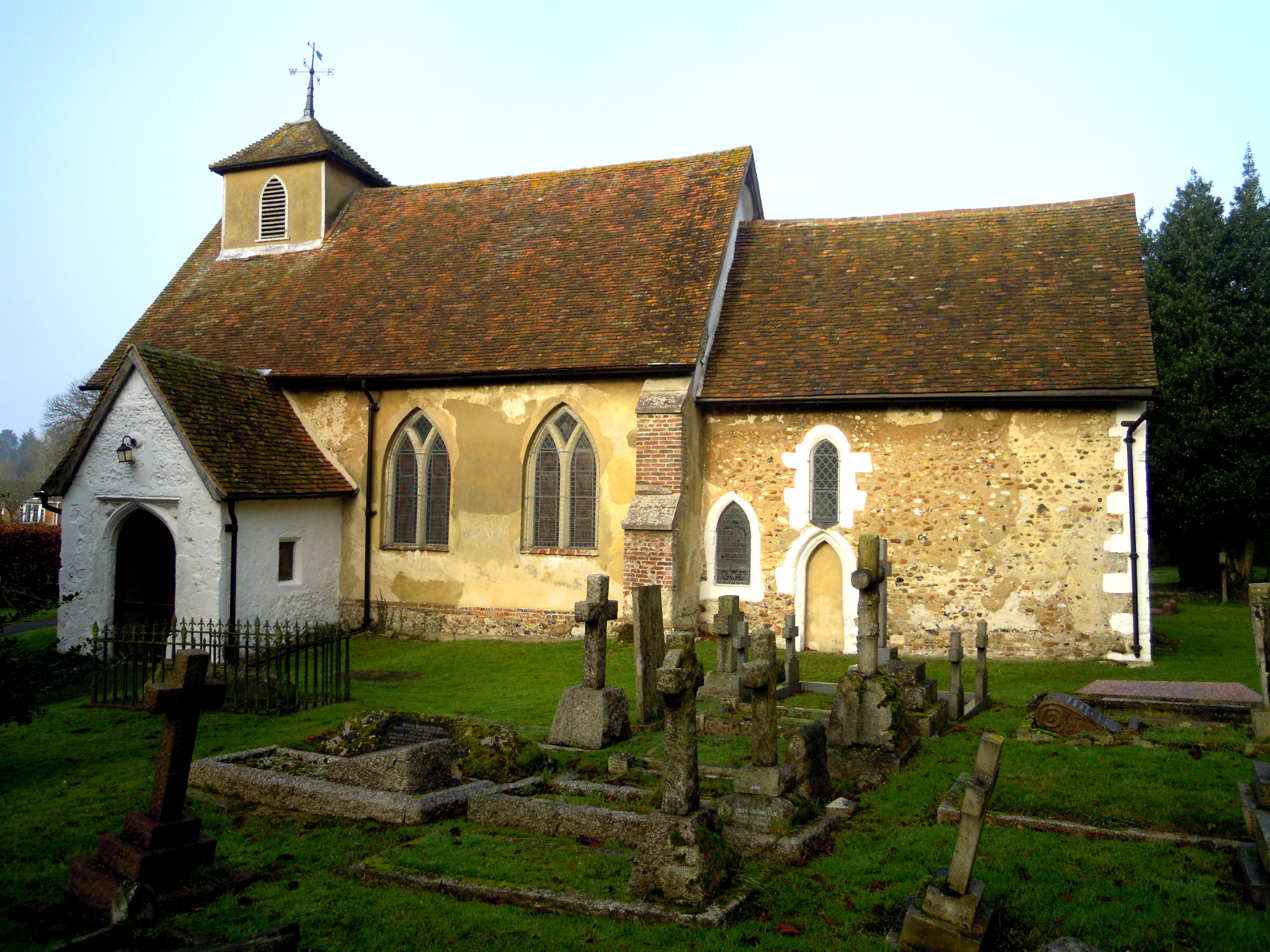
Church of St Mary the Virgin in Letchworth

The Church of St Mary the Virgin is the Church of England parish church of Old Letchworth in Hertfordshire. A church appears to have been on the site since before the Norman Conquest. The current church was built in the late 12th century and is Grade II listed. It comes under the Diocese of St Albans. The original dedication of the church is unknown; it was rededicated to St Mary during the First World War.

The church is the oldest building in the area and is only 60 feet long inside. Mentioned in the Domesday Book of 1086, parts of the building date to the 11th century and is built on the remains of an older Saxon structure. However, most of what is seen today dates to the late 12th century and was reroofed in the 15th century when the south porch was also added. The nave has three bays and a chancel. The church has a pyramidical timber-framed bell-cot with a tiled roof at the west end inside which is a bell dating to the 14th century. The exterior is of flint and ironstone random rubble, partly rendered, with freestone dressings and ashlar, brick and tile buttresses. The windows in the nave have a Y tracery. The gabled porch has a square headed doorway with shields in spandrels. Inside there is a carved effigy of the Crusader Sir Richard de Montfichet on a window sill. His heart is reputedly buried under the church.

After 1903 the small rural parish of Letchworth changed dramatically with the development of Letchworth Garden City. In 1908 a "mission church" dedicated to St Michael was opened on Norton Way South, closer to the new town centre. This in turn was replaced by another church (also dedicated to St Michael) on Broadway, which opened in 1967. The new St Michael's church officially became the parish church of the ecclesiastical parish of Letchworth (covering only the south-western part of the larger Garden City) in November 1967, with the old parish church of St Mary's thereafter being a chapel of ease to St Michael's. Structural problems with the 1960s St Michael's building led to its closure in December 2019, but St Mary's continues in use.

== Notable burials ==
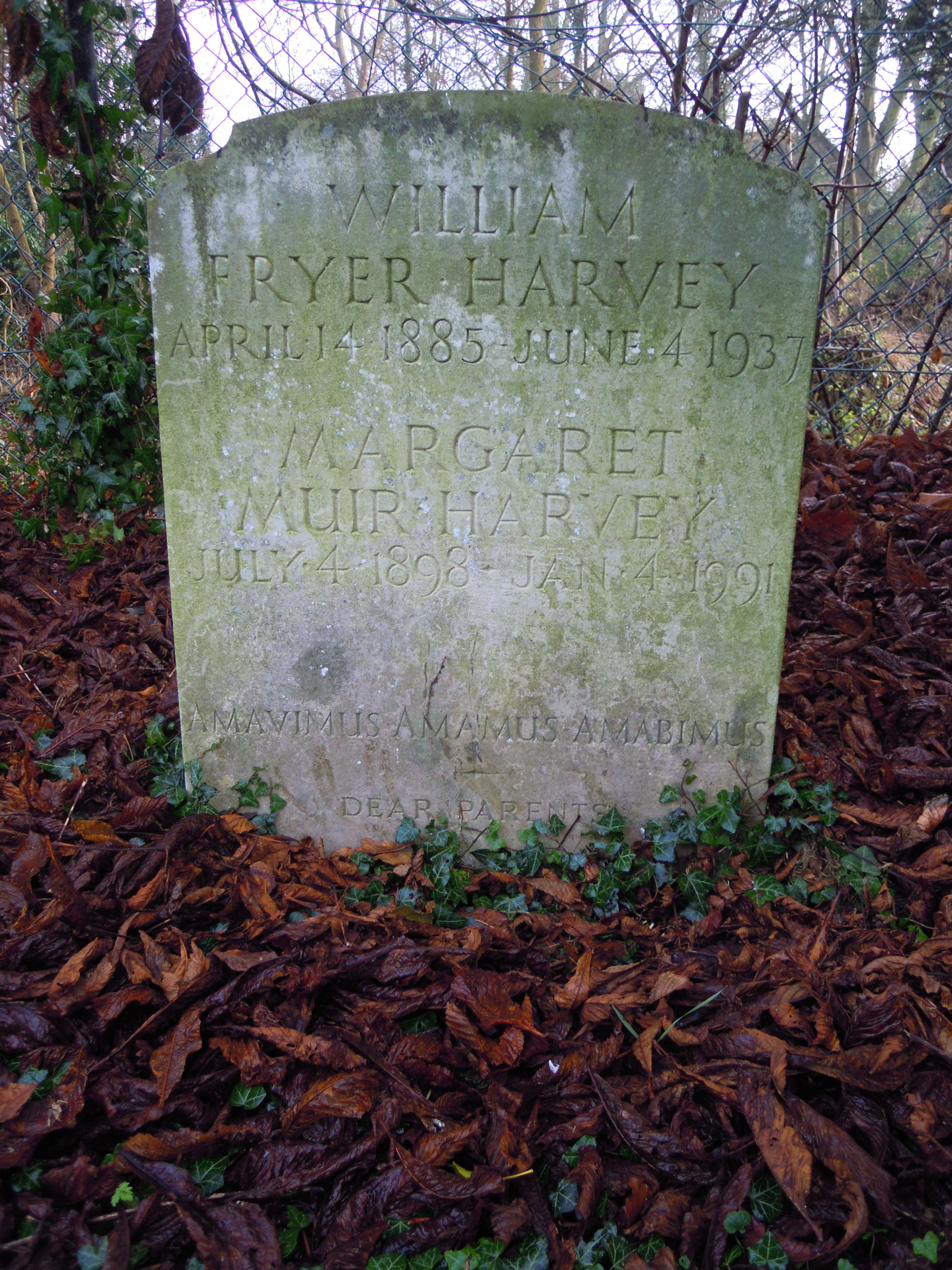
Grave of W. F. Harvey in the churchyard of St Mary's Church in Letchworth

- W. F. Harvey (1885-1937), horror writer, is buried in the churchyard.
