= Eugene Thacker =

American author

Education
- Education: University of Washington (BA); Rutgers University (PhD)

Philosophical work
- Era: Contemporary philosophy
- Region: Western philosophy
- School: Continental philosophy; Speculative realism
- Institutions: Parsons School of Design
- Main interests: Pessimism; Nihilism; Antihumanism; Anti-foundationalism; Collapsology; Horror fiction; Horror film; Philosophy of religion; Philosophy of technology; Weird fiction
- Notable ideas: Cosmic pessimism; Dark media; Biomedia
- Website: eugenethacker.com

Eugene Thacker is an American author. He is a professor of media studies at Parsons School of Design in New York City. His writing is associated with the philosophies of nihilism and pessimism. He is known for his books In the Dust of This Planet and Infinite Resignation.

== Life and education ==
Thacker was born and grew up in the Pacific Northwest. He received a Bachelor of Arts degree from University of Washington, and a Master of Arts and Doctor of Philosophy in comparative literature from Rutgers University. Prior to teaching at The New School, he was a professor at Georgia Institute of Technology in the school of literature, media, and communication.

== Works ==
=== Nihilism, pessimism, and speculative realism ===
Thacker's work has been associated with philosophical nihilism, pessimism, and to contemporary philosophies of speculative realism and collapsology. His short book Cosmic Pessimism defines pessimism as "the philosophical form of disenchantment": "Pessimism is the night-side of thought, a melodrama of the futility of the brain, a poetry written in the graveyard of philosophy."

Thacker's book Infinite Resignation was published by Repeater Books. The book combines several genres of writing, and consists of fragments, aphorisms, and poetic prose that mixes the personal and philosophical. Thacker engages with writers like Thomas Bernhard, E.M. Cioran, Osamu Dazai, Søren Kierkegaard, Clarice Lispector, Giacomo Leopardi, Fernando Pessoa, and Schopenhauer. The New York Times notes: "Thacker has thrown a party for all of these eloquent cranks in Infinite Resignation, and he is an excellent host… This book provides a metric ton of misery and a lot of company."

Thacker's After Life is a book of philosophy published by the University of Chicago Press. In it, Thacker argues that philosophies of life operates by way of a split between "Life" and "the living," resulting in a "metaphysical displacement" in which life is thought via another metaphysical term, such as time, form, or spirit: "Every ontology of life thinks of life in terms of something-other-than-life...that something-other-than-life is most often a metaphysical concept, such as time and temporality, form and causality, or spirit and immanence" Thacker traces this theme in Aristotle, Dionysius the Areopagite, John Scottus Eriugena, negative theology, Immanuel Kant, and Georges Bataille. After Life also includes comparisons with Islamic, Japanese, and Chinese philosophy.

Thacker's follow-up essay "Darklife: Negation, Nothingness, and the Will-to-Life in Schopenhauer" discusses the ontology of life in terms of negation, eliminativism, and "the inverse relationship between logic and life." Thacker argues that Schopenhauer's philosophy posits a "dark life" in opposition to the "ontology of generosity" of German Idealist thinkers such as Hegel and Schelling. Thacker has also written in a similar vein on the role of negation and "nothingness" in the work of mystical philosopher Meister Eckhart. Ultimately Thacker argues for a skepticism regarding "life": "Life is not only a problem of philosophy, but a problem for philosophy.

=== Horror and philosophy ===
Thacker's most widely read book is In the Dust of This Planet, part of the Horror of Philosophy trilogy. In it, Thacker explores the idea of the "unthinkable world" as represented in the horror genre, in philosophies of pessimism and nihilism, and in "darkness" mysticism. Thacker calls the horror of philosophy "the isolation of those moments in which philosophy reveals its own limitations and constraints, moments in which thinking enigmatically confronts the horizon of its own possibility." Thacker distinguishes the "world-for-us" (a human-centric view of the world), and the "world-in-itself" (the world as it exists), from what he calls the "world-without-us": "the world-without-us lies somewhere in between, in a nebulous zone that is at once impersonal and horrific."

In this and the other volumes of the trilogy Thacker writes about a wide range of work: H.P. Lovecraft, Algernon Blackwood, Edgar Allan Poe, Dante's Inferno, Les Chants de Maldoror by Comte de Lautréamont, the Faust myth, manga artist Junji Ito, contemporary horror authors Thomas Ligotti and Caitlín Kiernan, K-horror film, and the philosophy of Arthur Schopenhauer, Rudolph Otto, Medieval mysticism (Meister Eckhart, Angela of Foligno, John of the Cross), occult philosophy, and the philosophy of the Kyoto School.

These ideas extend to what Thacker calls dark media, or technologies that mediate between the natural and supernatural, and point to the limit of human perception and knowledge. Thacker has written a series of essays on "necrology", the decay or disintegration of the body politic. Thacker writes about plague, demonic possession, and the living dead, drawing upon the history of medicine, biopolitics, political theology, and the horror genre.

=== Philosophy, science, and technology ===
Thacker's earlier works adopt approaches from the philosophies of science, technology, and the study of the relation between science and science fiction. Many of his media contributions are developments of Science and Technology Studies. Examples are his book Biomedia, and his writings on bioinformatics, nanotechnology, biocomputing, complex adaptive systems, swarm intelligence, and network theory. Thacker defines biomedia as follows: "Biomedia entail the informatic recontextualization of biological components and processes, for ends that may be medical or nonmedical...biomedia continuously make the dual demand that information materialize itself...biomedia depend upon an understanding of biological as informational but not immaterial."

Thacker, along with Alexander Galloway and McKenzie Wark, published the co-authored book Excommunication: Three Inquiries in Media and Mediation. In it the authors ask: "Does everything that exists, exist to be presented and represented, to be mediated and remediated, to be communicated and translated? There are mediative situations in which heresy, exile, or banishment carry the day, not repetition, communion, or integration. There are certain kinds of messages that state 'there will be no more messages'. Hence for every communication there is a correlative excommunication." This approach has been called the "New York School of Media Theory."

=== Other writings ===
Thacker has written an anti-novel titled An Ideal for Living, of which American poet and conceptual writer Kenneth Goldsmith has said: "this an important book...these pages take cues from Burroughs and Gibson, while at the same time presciently pointing to the web-based path writing would take over the next decade." In the 1990s, Thacker, along with Ronald Sukenick and Mark Amerika, founded Alt-X Press, for which he edited the anthology of experimental writing Hard_Code. Thacker is part of the editorial board of underground publisher Schism Press.

Thacker is a contributor to The Japan Times Books section, where he has written about the work of Junji Ito, Osamu Dazai, Haruo Sato, Keiji Nishitani, Izumi Kyōka, Edogawa Rampo, and Zen death poetry.

He wrote a column for London-based Mute called "Occultural Studies," on topics as the Surrealist poet Robert Desnos, Schopenhauer's philosophy, the horror writing of Thomas Ligotti, and the music of And Also The Trees.

He has written Forewords to the English editions of the works of E. M. Cioran, published by Arcade Press.

He has contributed to limited edition books produced by Fiddleblack Press, Infinity Land Press, Locus+, Mount Abraxis, [NAME], Schism, and Zagava Press.

=== Other activities ===
Thacker also collaborated with artists and musicians. These include the art collective Fakeshop, which presented work at Ars Electronica, ACM SIGGRAPH, and the Whitney Biennial. He has also collaborated with Biotech Hobbyist, and co-authored the art book Creative Biotechnology: A User's Manual. Thacker as collaborated with Japanese noise musician Merzbow/Masami Akita, and with Iranian composer Siavash Amini.

== Influence ==
Dialogue between Marty Hart (Woody Harrelson) and Rust Cohle (Matthew McConaughey) from the finale of True Detective. Thacker's writing was acknowledged as an inspiration for Cohle, who describes himself as a philosophical pessimist.

In an interview with the Wall Street Journal, Nic Pizzolatto, creator and writer of True Detective, cites Thacker's In the Dust of This Planet as an influence on the TV series, particularly the worldview of lead character Rust Cohle, along with several other books: Ray Brassier's Nihil Unbound, Thomas Ligotti's The Conspiracy Against the Human Race, Jim Crawford's Confessions of an Antinatalist, and David Benatar's Better Never to Have Been.

In September 2014 the WNYC's Radiolab ran a show entitled "In the Dust of This Planet." The program traced the appropriation of Thacker's book of the same name in contemporary art, fashion, music video, and popular culture. Both Thacker's book and the Radiolab podcast were covered by Glenn Beck on TheBlazeTV. Thacker has commented on 'nihilism memes' in an interview: "Is it any accident that at a time when we have become acutely aware of the challenges concerning global climate change, we have also created this bubble of social media? I find social media and media culture generally to be a vapid, desperate, self-aggrandizing circus of species-specific solipsism — ironically, the stupidity of our species might be its only legacy."

Comic book author Warren Ellis cites as an influence the nihilist philosophies of Thacker and Peter Sjöstedt-H for his 2017 series Karnak: The Flaw in All Things, a re-imagining of the original Marvel Inhumans character Karnak.

The writing of Thacker and Thomas Ligotti is cited as an influence on the 2021 album The Nightmare of Being by the Gothenburg melodic death metal band At the Gates.

Thacker's writing is cited as an influence on Polia & Blastema, an experimental film and opera written and directed by E. Elias Merhige.

== Bibliography ==
- An Ideal for Living: An Anti-Novel. Schism Press, 2000 [20th Anniversary Edition, 2020]. ISBN 979-8682903832.
- Hard Code: Narrating the Network Society. Edited by Eugene Thacker. Alt-X Press, 2002. ISBN 978-1931560047.
- Biomedia. University of Minnesota Press, 2004. ISBN 978-0816643530.
- Creative Biotechnology: A User's Manual, co-authored with Natalie Jeremijenko and Heath Bunting. Locus+, 2004. ISBN 978-1899377220.
- The Global Genome: Biotechnology, Politics, and Culture. MIT Press, 2005. ISBN 978-0262701167.
- The Exploit: A Theory of Networks, co-authored with Alexander R. Galloway. University of Minnesota Press, 2007. ISBN 978-0816650446.
- After Life. University of Chicago Press, 2010. ISBN 978-0226793726.
- In the Dust of This Planet (Horror of Philosophy Vol. 1). Zero Books, 2011. ISBN 978-1846946769.
- Leper Creativity: The Cyclonopedia Symposium, co-edited with Ed Keller and Nicola Masciandaro. Punctum Books, 2012. ISBN 978-0615600468.
- Excommunication: Three Inquiries in Media and Mediation, co-authored with Alexander R. Galloway and McKenzie Wark. University of Chicago Press, 2013. ISBN 978-0226925226.
- Dark Nights of the Universe, co-authored with Daniel Colucciello Barber, Nicola Masciandaro, Alexander R. Galloway and François Laruelle. [NAME] Publications, 2013. ISBN 978-0984056675.
- And They Were Two in One and One in Two, co-edited with Nicola Masciandaro. Schism Press, 2014. ISBN 978-1494701239.
- Starry Speculative Corpse (Horror of Philosophy Vol. 2). Zero Books, 2015. ISBN 978-1782798910.
- Tentacles Longer Than Night (Horror of Philosophy Vol. 3). Zero Books, 2015. ISBN 978-1782798897.
- Cosmic Pessimism, with drawings by Keith Tilford. Univocal Publishing, 2015. ISBN 978-1937561475.
- Infinite Resignation. Repeater Books, 2018. ISBN 978-1912248193.
- Arthur Schopenhauer, On The Suffering Of The World. Edited with an Introduction by Eugene Thacker. Repeater Books, 2020. ISBN 978-1913462031.
- The Repeater Book of the Occult, co-edited with Tariq Goddard. Repeater Books, 2021. ISBN 978-1913462079.
- Songs for Sad Poets, Siavash Amini & Eugene Thacker, Hallow Ground Records, 2022
- Sad Planets. Co-authored with Dominic Pettman. Polity, 2024. ISBN 978-1-509-56237-4.
