= Dominic Pettman =

American cultural theorist and author

Dominic Pettman is a cultural theorist and author. He is University Professor of Media and New Humanities at The New School, teaching within the Culture and Media program at Eugene Lang College and also the Liberal Studies Program at The New School for Social Research (New York). He has held previous positions at the University of Melbourne, the University of Geneva, and the University of Amsterdam. Pettman's work combines cultural studies, critical media studies, and philosophical approaches concerning topics ranging from new media, popular culture, affect theory, sound studies, and animal studies.

== Select bibliography ==
=== Books ===
- Ghosting: On Disappearance (Polity, 2025)
- Seeking Attention: 30 Ways of Being Present (Repeater, 2025)
- Telling the Bees: An Interspecies Monologue (Fordham University Press, 2024)
- Sad Planets (Polity, 2024 - with Eugene Thacker)
- Peak Libido: Sex, Ecology, and the Collapse of Desire (Polity, 2020)
- The Humid Condition: More Overheated Observations (Punctum, 2020)
- Metagestures (Punctum, 2019 - with Carla Nappi)
- Creaturely Love: How Desire Makes Us More and Less Than Human (University of Minnesota, 2017)
- Sonic Intimacy: Voice, Species, Technics (Stanford University Press, 2017)
- Infinite Distraction (Polity, Theory Redux series, 2015)
- Humid, All Too Humid (Punctum, 2016)
- In Divisible Cities (Dead Letter Office / Punctum Books, 2013) . . . . + full-text "website"
- Look at the Bunny: Totem, Taboo, Technology (Zero Books, 2013)
- Human Error: Species-Being and Media Machines (University of Minnesota Press, 2011)
- Love and Other Technologies: Retrofitting Eros for the Information Age (Fordham University Press, 2006)
- Internationalizing Cultural Studies, (co-editor, Blackwells, 2004)
- Avoiding the Subject: Media, Culture and the Object (with Justin Clemens, AUP, 2004)
- After the Orgy: Toward a Politics of Exhaustion (SUNY Press, 2002)

=== Articles (selected) ===
- "Fasciastic Architecture: A Conversation Between Qigong and Psychoanalysis” with Carla Nappi, Capacious Journal, June 2023.
- "Netflix and Chills: On Digital Distraction During the Global Quarantine" (boundary 2, 2020)
- "The Mole and the Serpent: a Totemic Approach to Societies of Control" (Coils of the Serpent, 2020)
- "The Species Without Qualities: Critical Media Theory and The Posthumanities" (boundary 2, 2019)
- "Get Thee to a Phalanstery, or How Fourier Can Still Teach Us to Make Lemonade" (Public Domain Review, 2019)
- "Remember Baudrillard: On the Ecstasies of Posthumous Communication" (Public Seminar, 2018)
- "[Just Another Manic Monad: Of Glass, Bees, and Glass Bees"] Discourse (2017).
- "Some Remarks on the Legacy of Madame Francine Descartes" (Public Domain Review)
- "Libidinal Ecology: Sex and the Anthropocene" (Public Seminar, 2015)
- "The Nude in the Library" (Public Seminar, 2015)
- "The Screech Within Speech" (Sounding Out, 2015)
- "Lulu and the Centaur: Photographic Traces of Creaturely Love" (Necsus, 2015)
- "Wings of Desire: When Tesla Fell in Love with a Pigeon" (Cabinet, 2015)
- "The Tumblrst Tumblr, or How I Found the Angel of History Trapped on the Flypaper of Social Media" (Los Angeles Review of Books, 2014)
- "MOOCs: Herding Education to the Slaughter" (Mute Magazine, 2014)
- "The Noble Cabbage: A Review of Michael Marder's Plant-Thinking" (Los Angeles Review of Books, 2013)
- "So You Think You Can Think: How I Taught a Class on Reality TV by Turning It Into a Reality TV Competition" (Inside Higher Ed, 2013)
- "Tolstoy’s Bestiary: Animality and Animosity in The Kreutzer Sonata" (Angelaki, 2013)
- "Pavlov’s Podcast: The Acousmatic Voice in the Age of MP3s" (differences, 2012)
- "After the Beep: Answering Machines and Creaturely Life" (boundary 2, 2010)
- "Grizzly Man: Werner Herzog’s Anthropological Machine” (Theory and Event, 2009)
- "Love in the Time of Tamagotchi” (Theory, Culture & Society, 2009)
- "A Belated Invitation to the Orgy: The Complex Legacy of Jean Baudrillard," [introduction to new edition of] Fatal Strategies. (Semiotext(e), 2008).

== See also ==
- Animal Studies
- Cultural Studies
- Media Studies
- Philosophy of Technology
- Jean Baudrillard
