= W. F. Harvey =

English writer

- Born: William Fryer Harvey; 14 April 1885; Leeds, West Yorkshire, England
- Died: 4 June 1937 (aged 52); Letchworth, Hertfordshire, England
- Occupation: Short story writer

William Fryer Harvey AM (14 April 1885 – 4 June 1937), known as W. F. Harvey, was an English writer of short stories, most notably in the macabre and horror genres. Among his best-known stories are "August Heat" (1910) and "The Beast with Five Fingers" (1919), described by horror historian Les Daniels as "minor masterpieces".

== Early life and education ==
Born into a wealthy Quaker family in Leeds, West Yorkshire, he attended the Quaker Bootham School in Yorkshire and Leighton Park School in Reading before going on to Balliol College, Oxford. He took a degree in medicine at Leeds. Ill health dogged him, however, and he devoted himself to personal projects such as his first book of short stories, Midnight House (1910).

His brother was Thomas Edmund Harvey, MP.

== Military service ==
In World War I he initially joined the Friends' Ambulance Unit, but later served as a surgeon-lieutenant in the Royal Navy, and received the Albert Medal for Lifesaving. He received lung damage during his award-winning rescue operation. The damage troubled him for the rest of his life, but he continued to write both short stories and his cheerful and good-natured memoir We Were Seven (1936).

== Career ==
Before the war he had shown interest in adult education, on the staff of the Working Men's College, Fircroft, Selly Oak, Birmingham. He returned to Fircroft in 1920, becoming Warden, but by 1925 ill-health forced his retirement.

In 1928 he published a second collection of short stories, The Beast with Five Fingers, and in 1933 he published a third, Moods and Tenses. He lived in Switzerland with his wife for much of this time, but nostalgia for his home country caused his return to England.

== Personal life ==
Harvey was a practising Quaker.

== Death ==
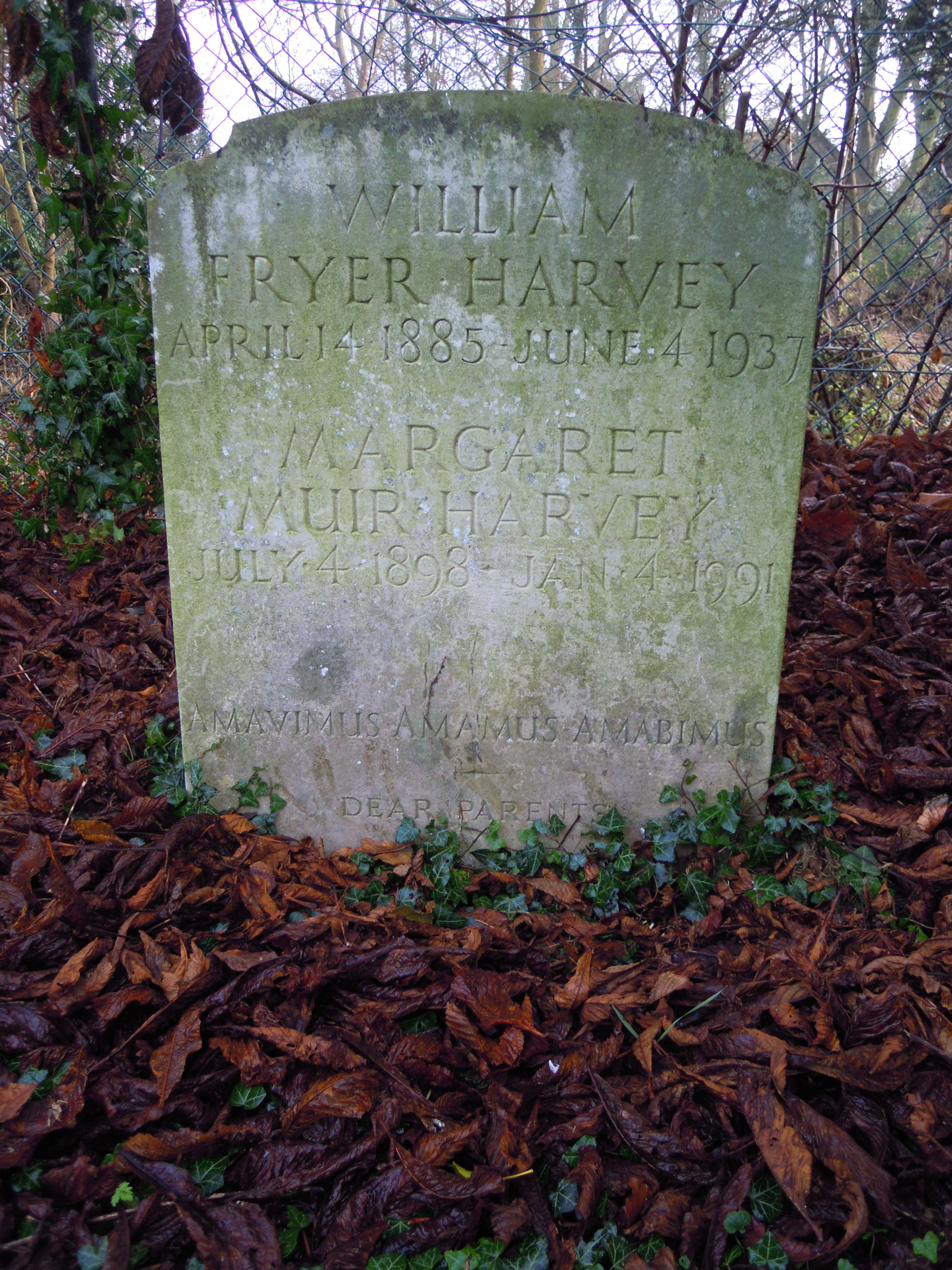
Harvey's grave in the churchyard of St Mary's Church, Letchworth

Harvey moved to Letchworth in 1935 and died there in 1937 at the age of 52. After a funeral service at the local Friends Meeting House Harvey was buried in the churchyard of St Mary the Virgin in Old Letchworth.

== Posthumous publications ==
The release of the film The Beast with Five Fingers (1946), directed by Robert Florey and starring Peter Lorre, inspired by what was perhaps his most famous and praised short story, caused a resurgence of interest in Harvey's work. In 1951 a posthumous fourth collection of his stories, The Arm of Mrs Egan and Other Stories, appeared, including a set of twelve stories left in manuscript at the time of his death, headed "Twelve Strange Cases".

In 2009 Wordsworth Editions printed an omnibus volume of Harvey's stories, titled The Beast with Five Fingers, in its Tales of Mystery and the Supernatural series (ISBN 978-1-84022-179-4). The volume contains 45 stories and an introduction by David Stuart Davies.

== Publications ==
- Midnight House and Other Tales (1910)
- The Misadventures of Athelstan Digby (1920)
- A Conversation About God (1923), with William Fearon Halliday
- The Beast with Five Fingers and Other Tales (1928)
- Quaker Byways and Other Papers (1929)
- Moods and Tenses: Tales (1933)
- The Mysterious Mr. Badman (1934)
- John Rutty of Dublin, Quaker Physician (1934), reprinted from The Friends' Quarterly Examiner
- We Were Seven (1936)
- Caprimulgus (1936)
- Mr. Murray and the Boococks (1938)
- Midnight Tales (1946) – a selection of twenty macabre tales from earlier collections, published by J. M. Dent
- The Arm of Mrs. Egan and Other Stories (1951) – previously uncollected stories, mainly mysteries, published by J. M. Dent
- The Double Eye (2009), introduction by Richard Dalby
- The Beast with Five Fingers: Supernatural Stories (2009), selected and introduced by David Stuart Davies, published by Wordsworth Editions
