= Algernon Blackwood =

English journalist and author (1869–1951)

Algernon Blackwood CBE
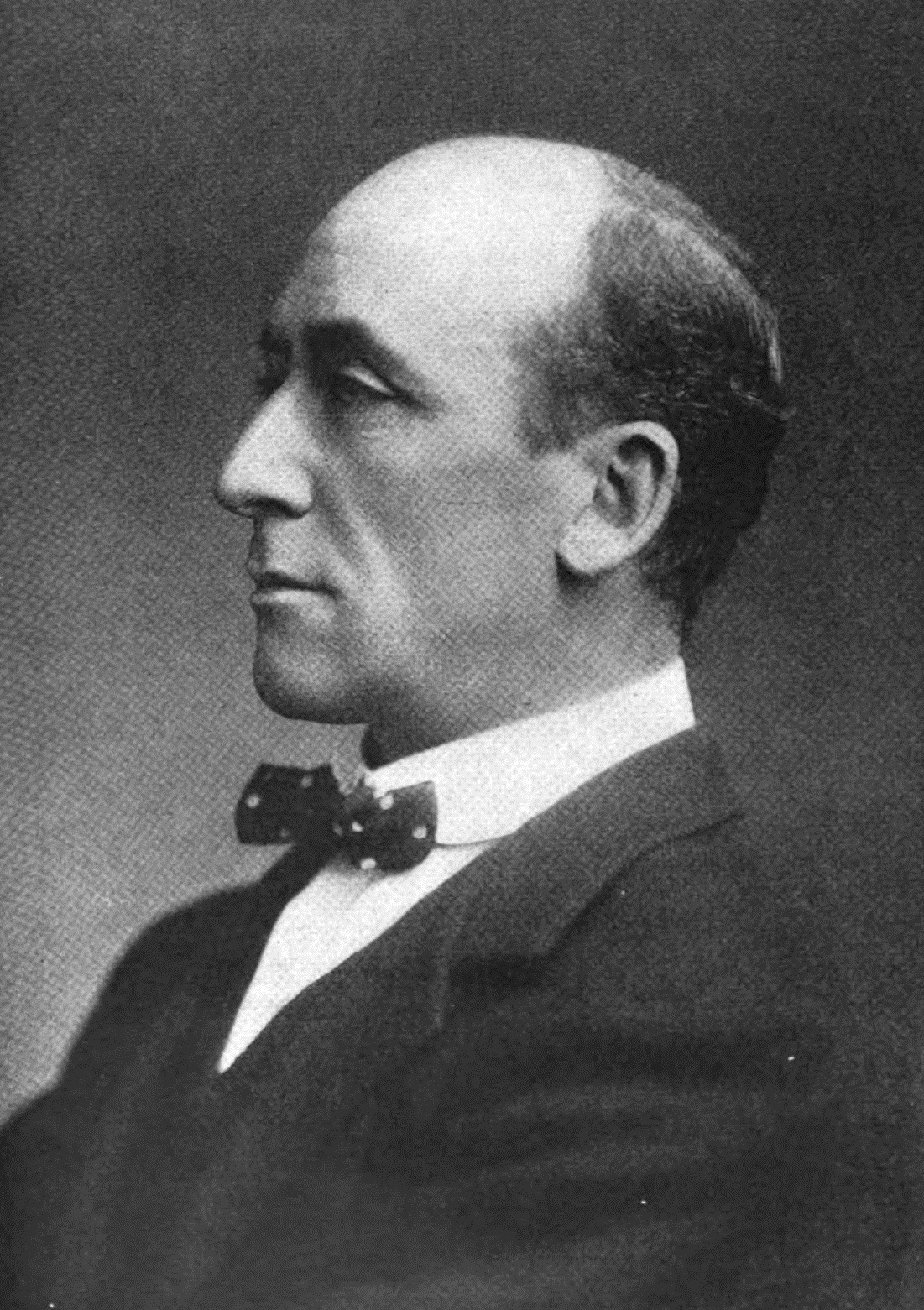
- Born: Algernon Henry Blackwood; 14 March 1869; Shooter's Hill, Kent, England
- Died: 10 December 1951 (aged 82); London, England
- Occupations: Writer, broadcaster
- Writing career
- Genres: Fantasy, horror, weird fiction
- Notable works: The Centaur, "The Willows", "The Wendigo", John Silence stories

Algernon Henry Blackwood (14 March 1869 – 10 December 1951) was an English broadcasting narrator, journalist, novelist and short story writer, and among the most prolific ghost story writers in the history of the genre. The literary critic S. T. Joshi stated, "His work is more consistently meritorious than any weird writer's except Dunsany's" and that his short story collection Incredible Adventures (1914) "may be the premier weird collection of this or any other century".

== Life and work ==
Blackwood was born in Shooter's Hill (now part of southeast London, then part of northwest Kent). Between 1871 and 1880, he lived at Crayford Manor House, Crayford and he was educated at Wellington College. His father, Sir Stevenson Arthur Blackwood, was a Post Office administrator; his mother, Harriet Dobbs, was the widow of the 6th Duke of Manchester. According to Peter Penzoldt, his father, "though not devoid of genuine good-heartedness, had appallingly narrow religious ideas". After Algernon read the work of a Hindu sage left behind at his parents' house, he developed an interest in Buddhism and other eastern philosophies.

Blackwood had a varied career, working as a dairy farmer in Canada, where he also operated a hotel for six months, bartender, model, reporter for The New York Times, private secretary, businessman, and violin teacher. During his time in Canada, he also became one of the founding members of the Toronto Theosophical Society in February 1891. Throughout his adult life, he was an occasional essayist for periodicals. In his late thirties, he moved back to England and started to write stories of the supernatural. He was successful, writing at least ten original collections of short stories and later telling them on radio and television. He also wrote 14 novels, several children's books and a number of plays, most of which were produced, but not published. He was an avid lover of nature and the outdoors, as many of his stories reflect. To satisfy his interest in the supernatural, he joined The Ghost Club. He never married; according to his friends he was a loner, but also cheerful company.

Jack Sullivan stated that "Blackwood's life parallels his work more neatly than perhaps that of any other ghost story writer. Like his lonely but fundamentally optimistic protagonists, he was a combination of mystic and outdoorsman; when he wasn't steeping himself in occultism, including Rosicrucianism, or Buddhism he was likely to be skiing or mountain climbing." Blackwood was a member of one of the factions of the Hermetic Order of the Golden Dawn, as was his contemporary Arthur Machen. Cabalistic themes influence his novel The Human Chord.

His two best-known stories are probably "The Willows" and "The Wendigo". He would often write stories for newspapers at short notice, so that he and his biographers are not sure exactly how many short stories he wrote. Though Blackwood wrote a number of horror stories, his most typical work seeks less to frighten than to induce a sense of awe. Good examples are the novels The Centaur, which reaches a climax with a traveller's sight of a herd of the mythical creatures; and Julius LeVallon and its sequel The Bright Messenger, which deal with reincarnation and the possibility of a new, mystical evolution of human consciousness. In correspondence with Peter Penzoldt, Blackwood wrote,

My fundamental interest, I suppose, is signs and proofs of other powers that lie hidden in us all; the extension, in other words, of human faculty. So many of my stories, therefore, deal with extension of consciousness; speculative and imaginative treatment of possibilities outside our normal range of consciousness.... Also, all that happens in our universe is natural; under Law; but an extension of our so limited normal consciousness can reveal new, extra-ordinary powers etc., and the word "supernatural" seems the best word for treating these in fiction. I believe it possible for our consciousness to change and grow, and that with this change we may become aware of a new universe. A "change" in consciousness, in its type, I mean, is something more than a mere extension of what we already possess and know.

== Autobiography ==
Blackwood wrote an autobiography of his early years, Episodes Before Thirty (1923), and there is a biography, Starlight Man, by Mike Ashley (ISBN 0-7867-0928-6).

== Death ==
Blackwood died after experiencing several strokes. Officially his death on 10 December 1951 was from cerebral thrombosis, with arteriosclerosis as a contributing factor. He was cremated at Golders Green crematorium. A few weeks later his nephew took his ashes to Saanenmöser Pass in the Swiss Alps, and scattered them in the mountains that he had loved for more than forty years.

== Bibliography ==
=== Novels ===
By date of first publication:

- A Mysterious House (1889)
- Jimbo: A Fantasy (1909)
- The Education of Uncle Paul (1909)
- The Human Chord (1910)
- The Centaur (1911)
- A Prisoner in Fairyland (1913); sequel to The Education of Uncle Paul
- The Extra Day (1915)
- Julius LeVallon (1916)
- The Wave (1916)
- The Promise of Air (1918)
- The Garden of Survival (1918)
- The Bright Messenger (1921); sequel to Julius LeVallon
- Episodes Before Thirty (1923)
- Dudley & Gilderoy: A Nonsense (1929)

Children's novels:

- Sambo and Snitch (1927)
- The Fruit Stoners: Being the Adventures of Maria Among the Fruit Stoners (1934)

=== Plays ===
By date of first performance:

- The Starlight Express (1915), coauthored with Violet Pearn; incidental music by Edward Elgar; based on Blackwood's 1913 novel A Prisoner in Fairyland
- Karma a reincarnation play in prologue epilogue and three acts (1918), coauthored with Violet Pearn;
- The Crossing (1920a), coauthored with Bertram Forsyth; based on Blackwood's 1913 short story "Transition"
- Through the Crack (1920), coauthored with Violet Pearn; based on Blackwood's 1909 novel The Education of Uncle Paul and 1915 novel The Extra Day
- White Magic (1921), coauthored with Bertram Forsyth
- The Halfway House (1921), coauthored with Elaine Ainley
- Max Hensig (1929), coauthored with Frederick Kinsey Peile; based on Blackwood's 1907 short story "Max Hensig – Bacteriologist and Murderer"

=== Short fiction collections ===
By date of first publication:

- The Empty House and Other Ghost Stories (1906); original collection. Includes "The Strange Adventures of a Private Secretary in New York".
- The Listener and Other Stories (1907); original collection
- John Silence (1908); original collection; reprinted with added preface, 1942
- The Lost Valley and Other Stories (1910); original collection
- Pan's Garden: a Volume of Nature Stories (1912); original collection
- Ten Minute Stories (1914a); original collection
- Incredible Adventures (1914b); original collection
- Day and Night Stories (1917); original collection
- Wolves of God, and Other Fey Stories (1921); original collection
- Tongues of Fire and Other Sketches (1924); original collection
- Ancient Sorceries and Other Tales (1927a); selections from previous Blackwood collections
- The Dance of Death and Other Tales (1927b); selections from previous Blackwood collections; reprinted as 1963's The Dance of Death and Other Stories
- Strange Stories (1929); selections from previous Blackwood collections
- Short Stories of To-Day & Yesterday (1930); selections from previous Blackwood collections
- The Willows and Other Queer Tales (1932); selected by G. F. Maine from previous Blackwood collections
- Shocks (1935); original collection
- The Tales of Algernon Blackwood (1938); selections from previous Blackwood collections, with a new preface by Blackwood
- Selected Tales of Algernon Blackwood (1942); selections from previous Blackwood collections (not to be confused with the 1964 Blackwood collection of the same title)
- Selected Short Stories of Algernon Blackwood (1945); selections from previous Blackwood collections
- The Doll and One Other (1946); original collection
- Tales of the Uncanny and Supernatural (1949); selections from previous Blackwood collections
- In the Realm of Terror (1957); selections from previous Blackwood collections
- The Dance of Death and Other Stories (1963); reprint of 1927's The Dance of Death and Other Tales
- Selected Tales of Algernon Blackwood (1964); selections from previous Blackwood collections (not to be confused with the 1942 Blackwood collection of the same title)
- Tales of the Mysterious and Macabre (1967); selections from previous Blackwood collections
- Ancient Sorceries and Other Stories (1968); selections from previous Blackwood collections
- Best Ghost Stories of Algernon Blackwood (1973), selected and introduced by Everett F. Bleiler; selections from previous Blackwood collections; includes Blackwood's own preface to 1938's The Tales of Algernon Blackwood
- The Best Supernatural Tales of Algernon Blackwood (1973); selected and introduced by Felix Morrow; selections from 1929's Strange Stories
- Tales of Terror and Darkness (1977); omnibus edition of Tales of the Mysterious and Macabre (1967) and Tales of the Uncanny and Supernatural (1949).
- Tales of the Supernatural (1983); selected and introduced by Mike Ashley; selections from previous Blackwood collections
- The Magic Mirror (1989); Original collection selected, introduced, and with notes by Mike Ashley;
- The Complete John Silence Stories (1997); selected and introduced by S. T. Joshi; reprint of 1908's John Silence (without the preface to the 1942 reprint) and the one remaining John Silence story, "A Victim of Higher Space"
- Ancient Sorceries and Other Weird Stories (2002); selected, introduced, and notes by S. T. Joshi; selections from previous Blackwood collections
- Algernon Blackwood's Canadian Tales of Terror (2004); selected, introduced, with notes by John Robert Colombo; eight stories of special Canadian interest plus information on the author's years in Canada
- Roarings from Further Out: Four Weird Novellas (2020); selected and edited by Xavier Aldana Reyes; part of British Library Publishing's Tales of the Weird series
- The Wendigo and Other Stories (2024); edited by Aaron Worth

=== Essays ===
- The Lure of the Unknown: Essays on the Strange (2022); edited and introduced by Mike Ashley. Dublin: Swan River Press. Limited to 400 unnumbered copies. (Two photographic postcards and a facsimile signature of Blackwood laid in).

== Legacy ==
H. P. Lovecraft included Blackwood as one of the "Modern Masters" in the section of that name in "Supernatural Horror in Literature". In The Books in My Life, Henry Miller chose Blackwood's The Bright Messenger as "the most extraordinary novel on psychoanalysis, one that dwarfs the subject." Authors who have been influenced by Blackwood's work include Anne Rice, William Hope Hodgson, George Allan England, H. Russell Wakefield, "L. Adams Beck" (Elizabeth Louisa Moresby), Margery Lawrence, Evangeline Walton, Ramsey Campbell and Graham Joyce.

In the first draft of his guidance notes to translators of his work, "Nomenclature of The Lord of the Rings", J. R. R. Tolkien stated that he derived the phrase "crack of doom" from an unnamed story by Blackwood. In her book, Tolkien's Modern Reading, Holly Ordway states that this unnamed Blackwood work is his 1909 novel The Education of Uncle Paul. She explains that the children of Paul's sister, whom he is visiting, tell him of the "crack between Yesterday and To-morrow", and that "if we're very quick, we can find the crack and slip through... And, once inside there, there's no time, of course... Anything may happen, and everything come true." Ordway comments that this would have attracted Tolkien because of his interest in travelling back in time. C. S. Lewis was an enthusiastic reader of Blackwood's fiction, especially The Education of Uncle Paul and John Silence.

Donald Wandrei, in a 7 February 1927 letter to H. P. Lovecraft, listed fifteen fiction titles by Algernon Blackwood among his collection of "weird books" that Wandrei had read. Frank Belknap Long's 1928 story "The Space-Eaters" alludes to Blackwood's fiction. Clark Ashton Smith's story "Genius Loci" (1933) was inspired by Blackwood's story "The Transfer". The plot of Caitlin R. Kiernan's novel Threshold (2001) is influenced by Blackwood's work. Kiernan has cited Blackwood as an important influence on her writing. Blackwood appears as a character in the novel The Curse of the Wendigo by Rick Yancey.

== Critical studies ==
An early essay on Blackwood's work was "Algernon Blackwood: An Appreciation," by Grace Isabel Colbron (1867–1943), which appeared in The Bookman in February 1915.

Peter Penzoldt devotes the final chapter of The Supernatural in Fiction (1952) to an analysis of Blackwood's work and dedicates the book "with deep admiration and gratitude, to Algernon Blackwood, the greatest of them all". A critical analysis of Blackwood's work appears in Jack Sullivan, Elegant Nightmares: The English Ghost Story From Le Fanu to Blackwood, 1978.

David Punter has written two essays on Blackwood. There is a critical essay on Blackwood's work in S. T. Joshi's The Weird Tale (1990). Edward Wagenknecht analyses Blackwood's work in his book Seven Masters of Supernatural Fiction. Eugene Thacker, in his "Horror of Philosophy" series of books, discusses Blackwood's stories "The Willows" and "The Man Whom The Trees Loved" as examples of how supernatural horror poses philosophical questions regarding the relation between human beings and the "cosmic indifference" of the world.

Christopher Matthew Scott analyzes Blackwood's use of Christian symbolism and story setting as connected to the author's biography; describing a spiritual progression up from hellish city, through garden, forest, and mountain. Brian R. Hauser discusses Blackwood's John Silence in the context of figures made popular by 1990s cinematic narratives, grouping him with Ichabod Crane and Fox Mulder, and classifying him as an early example of the supernatural detective whose investigation of a traumatized space mirrors a psychoanalyst's investigation of a traumatized psyche. Henry Bartholomew includes the "dark ecology" of Blackwood's "Pan's Garden" in his discussion of speculative realism and the gothic.

== See also ==
- List of horror fiction authors
- Religion and mythology
- Tales of Mystery, a 1960s British supernatural television drama series
- Weird fiction

== General sources ==
- Ashley, Mike (1987). Algernon Blackwood: A Bio-Bibliography. Westport, CT: Greenwood Press. ISBN 0-313-25158-4.
- Ashley, Mike (2001). Algernon Blackwood: An Extraordinary Life. New York: Carroll & Graf. ISBN 0-7867-0928-6. US edition of Starlight Man: The Extraordinary Life of Algernon Blackwood.
- Ashley, Mike (2001). Starlight Man: The Extraordinary Life of Algernon Blackwood. London: Constable & Robinson Ltd. ISBN 1-84119-417-4. UK edition of Algernon Blackwood: An Extraordinary Life.
- Blackwood, Algernon (2002). Episodes Before Thirty. New York: Turtle Point Press. ISBN 1-885586-83-3. Modern reissue of subject's memoir; originally published in 1923 (London: Cassell & Co.).
- Burleson, Donald. "Algernon Blackwood's 'The Listener: A Hearing'". Studies in Weird Fiction 5 (Spring 1989), pp. 15–19.
- Colombo, John Robert. "Blackwood's Books: A Bibliography Devoted to Algernon Blackwood" Toronto Hounslow Press 1981 ISBN 0-88882-055-0
- Colombo, John Robert. (ed) Algernon Blackwood's Canadian Tales of Terror Lake Eugenia, Ontario Battered Silicon Dispatch Box 2004 ISBN 1-55246-605-1
- Goddin, Jeffrey. "Subtle Perceptions: The Fantasy Novels of Algernon Blackwood" in Darrell Schweitzer (ed) Discovering Classic Fantasy Fiction, Gillette NJ: Wildside Press, 1986, pp. 94–103.
- Johnson, George M. "Algernon Blackwood". Dictionary of Literary Biography. Late-Victorian and Edwardian British Novelists, First Series. Ed. George M. Johnson. Detroit: Gale, 1995.
- Johnson, George M. "Algernon Blackwood". Dictionary of Literary Biography. British Short-Fiction Writers, 1880–1914. Ed. William F. Naufftus. Detroit: Gale, 1995.
- Johnson, George M. "Algernon Blackwood". New Dictionary of National Biography. Ed. Brian Harrison. Oxford: Oxford University Press, 2004.
- Johnson, George M. "Algernon Blackwood’s Modernist Experiments in Psychical Detection". Formal Investigations: Aesthetic Style in Late-Victorian and Edwardian Detective Fiction. Stuttgart: Ibidem Press, 2007. pp. 29–51.
- Johnson, George M. "The Other Side of Edwardian Fiction: Two Forgotten Fantasy Novels of 1911". Wormwood: Literature of the fantastic, supernatural and decadent. UK, No. 16 (Spring 2011) 3–15.
- Joshi, S. T. (1990). The Weird Tale. Austin, TX: University of Texas Press. pp. 87–132, 236–38, 246–48, 266–69. ISBN 0-292-79057-0.
- Joshi, S. T. (2014). Unutterable Horror: A History of Supernatural Fiction. New York, NY: Hippocampus Press. pp. 439–448. ISBN 978-1-61498-089-6.
- Thacker, Eugene. "How Algernon Blackwood Turned Nature Into Sublime Horror". LitHub. (March 8, 2021).
- Tuck, Donald H. (1974). The Encyclopedia of Science Fiction and Fantasy. Chicago: Advent. pp. 47–49. ISBN 0-911682-20-1.
- Wessells, Henry (2023). "Etta, with much affection from Blackie." The Book Collector 72 (Summer): 328–331.
