= Grace Isabel Colbron =

American writer (1867–1943)

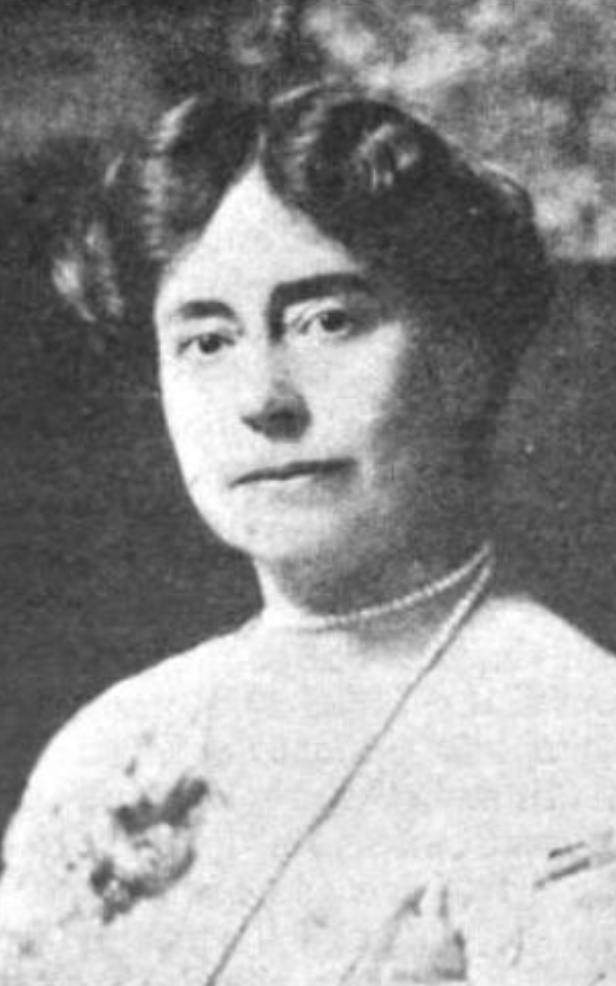
- Colbron, from a 1914 publication
- Born: Grace Isabel Merchant; June 24, 1867; New York, New York, U.S.
- Died: September 8, 1943 (aged 76); Wilmington, Delaware, U.S.
- Other name: J. Marchand (pseudonym)
- Occupations: Writer, playwright, editor, translator, theatrical agent

Grace Isabel Merchant Colbron (June 24, 1867 (Note: June 24, 1867 is the birthdate given on Colbron's United States passport application in 1890; it is consistent with her appearance as a 3-year-old child in the 1870 United States census, via Ancestry. But some sources give 1869 as her birth year.) – September 8, 1943) was an American writer, editor, and translator. She also wrote plays and worked as a theatrical director, actress, and agent. She was active in progressive reforms, especially the peace and single-tax movements.

== Early life and education ==
Colbron was born in New York City, the daughter of Albert Thorpe Merchant and Isabel de Forest Merchant. Her father died in 1876; her mother married stockbroker and photographer William Townsend Colbron in 1880. Her maternal grandfather was the nephew and namesake of Cornelius Vanderbilt. Colbron studied in schools in Germany and traveled in Europe, learning several languages.

== Career ==
Colbron was a writer, editor, translator (from several languages), playwright, literary critic, and poet. She is especially known for her work with Austrian crime writer Auguste Groner. She co-translated two shows that appeared on Broadway, Comtesse Coquette (1907) and The Guardsman (1924–1925). She also worked as a theatrical actress, director and agent.

Colbron was involved in progressive causes including women's rights and peace, but especially the single-tax movement. She was financial secretary of the Women's Henry George League of Manhattan. She spoke at a national meeting of the Women's Single Tax League in Washington in 1912. "Miss Colbron is the only woman lecturer sent out over the country by the Henry George Single Tax League," reported a Topeka newspaper when she lectured there in 1913.

== Publications ==
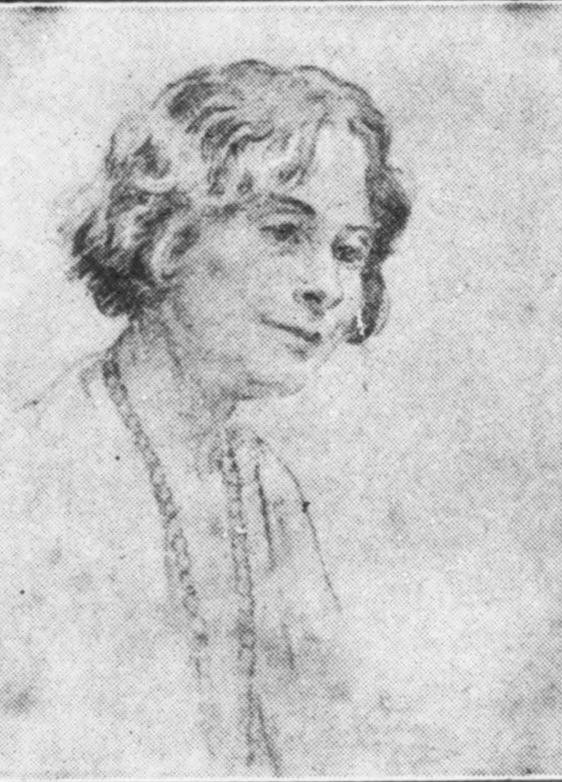
Colbron, around 1930

=== As author or co-author ===
- A Patron of Art (play)
- "The Training of a German Actress" and "Dancing and Pantomime" (1904, articles, The Cosmopolitan)
- "Women and War" (1905, article)
- "Radicalism in Literature" and "Single Taxers of Germany in Conference" (1905, articles, The Single Tax Review)
- The Love That Blinds (1906, play, with Clayton Meeker Hamilton)
- Joe Müller, Detective (1910, novel, with Auguste Groner)
- "Single Tax, a Fundamental Reform" (1914, Life and Labor)
- "Algernon Blackwood: An Appreciation" (1915, The Bookman)
- "The Ballad of Bethlehem Steel" (1915, poem)
- The Lady in Blue: A Joseph Müller Story (1922, novel, with Auguste Groner)
- The Club Car Mystery (1928, novel)

=== As translator or co-translator ===
- Roberto Bracco, Comtesse Coquette (1907, translated with Dirce St. Cyr)
- Bjørnstjerne Bjørnson, A Lesson in Marriage (1910)
- Karl Ferdinand Gutzkow, Sword and Queue (1914)
- Ernst von Wolzogen, The Third Sex (1914)
- Ferenc Molnár, The Guardsman (1924, translated with Hans Bartsch)
- Otto Rung, Shadows That Pass (1924)
- Karin Michaelis, Venture's End (1927)
- Jacob Paludan, Birds around the Light (1928)
- Arthur Schnitzler, The Living Hours, Anatol, The Green Cockatoo (1917) The Lady with the Dagger (1927), and Reigen, The affairs of Anatol and other plays (1933)
- Auguste Groner, The Case of the Lamp That Went Out, The Case of the Golden Bullet, The Case of the Pool of Blood in the Pastor's Study, The Case of the Pocket Diary Found in the Snow, The Case of the Registered Letter, The Man with the Black Cord (1911), and Mene tekel: A tale of strange happenings (1918)

== Death and legacy ==
Colbron was on a lecture tour when she died from pneumonia in 1943, in Wilmington, Delaware, at the age of 76. Her ashes were buried at the Woodland Theatre in Arden, Delaware. Her anti-war poem "Ballad of Bethlehem Steel" was included in Constance M. Ruzich, ed., International Poetry of the First World War: An Anthology of Lost Voices (Bloomsbury 2020, 2022).
