= Howard Park and Gardens =

Recreation ground in Letchworth, England

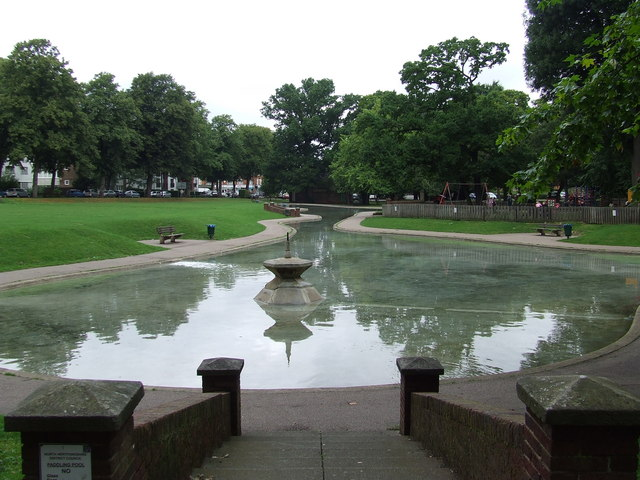
- The paddling pool in Howard Park
- Interactive map of Howard Park and Gardens
- Location: Letchworth
- OS grid: TL 22150 32577
- Coordinates: 51°58′42″N 0°13′23″W
- Area: 3 hectares (7.4 acres)
- Designation: Grade II
- Website: www.north-herts.gov.uk/howard-park-and-gardens

Howard Park and Gardens is a public recreation ground in Letchworth, in Hertfordshire, England, laid out when the garden city of Letchworth was created. It is listed Grade II in Historic England's Register of Parks and Gardens.

== History ==
The park and gardens are named after Ebenezer Howard, who pioneered the idea of creating garden cities; they would benefit the whole community, they would be well planned and integrate the best aspects of town and country. The first garden city was Letchworth, on a site acquired in 1903. It was planned in 1904 by the architects Barry Parker and Raymond Unwin; it included a corridor of green space, which became the park and gardens, within a residential area. It was laid out from 1904 to 1911.

== Description ==
The area is about 3 hectares (7.4 acres). Howard Park, to the north, and Howard Gardens, to the south, are divided by Hillshott Road. Norton Way South is on the western border.

The more informal Park has a large green space, a play area, a paddling pool opened in 1930, a refreshment kiosk and public toilets. East of the paddling pool is a memorial to Ebenezer Howard: a stone tablet installed in 1930, flanked by curved brick screen walls. In the south-west corner of the Park is the Mrs Howard Memorial Hall. It was designed by Barry Parker and Raymond Unwin, and was built in 1905–1906, the first public building in the new town. It is a Grade II listed building, and is described in the listing as a smaller scale version of the Church of Christ, Scientist in Manchester (now the Edgar Wood Centre).

In the more formal Gardens there is a bowling green and pavilion, paths and mature trees, and a wildflower area. In the south is the C F Ball Memorial Garden, created about 1936. There is also a statue of the poet Sappho and a small footbridge, Flamingo Bridge, which crosses Pix Brook, linking the area to Rushby Mead.

The First Garden City Heritage Museum is situated next to Howard Gardens, adjacent to its western boundary. It was built in 1906–1907, as offices for the Parker and Unwin firm, in the style of a medieval hall house; it is a Grade II* listed building.

== See also ==
- Broadway, Letchworth
