= Richard Smith (artist) =

British painter and printmaker (1931–2016)

Richard Smith CBE
- Born: 26 October 1931; Letchworth Garden City, Hertfordshire, England
- Died: 15 April 2016 (aged 81); Patchogue, New York, US
- Known for: Painting, printmaking, sculpture
- Movement: Pop art

Richard Smith, CBE (27 October 1931 – 15 April 2016) was an English painter and printmaker. Smith produced work in a range of styles, and is credited with extending the field of painting through his shaped, sculptural canvases. A key figure in the British development of Pop Art, Smith was chosen to represent Britain in the 1970 Venice Biennale.

== Life ==
Richard Smith was born in Letchworth, Hertfordshire, the first of the planned Garden Cities. After national service with the Royal Air Force in Hong Kong, he studied at St Albans School of Art and later undertook post-graduate studies at the Royal College of Art in London from 1954 to 1957. From 1957 to 1958 he was a lecturer at Hammersmith College of Art. He was awarded a Harkness Fellowship in 1959 and travelled to America and spent several years there painting and teaching, with his first one-man show at the Green Gallery, New York, in 1961. In 1970 he was the British representative at the Venice Biennale and in 1975 a retrospective exhibition of his work was exhibited at the Tate Gallery in London. He resettled permanently in New York in 1976.

== Work ==
Smith's early work drew on packaging and advertising, which led to his being associated by some critics to the Pop Art movement. Smith stated that his work was "often physically related to hoardings or cinema screens which never present objects actual size; you could drown in a glass of beer, live in a semi-detached cigarette packet". However, his concerns were largely formal. His works from this period, such as Panatella (1961) can be seen as abstract works whose scale, handling of paint and use of colour show the influence of American colour field painters such as Mark Rothko and Sam Francis, and he tried to integrate their expressive painterly concerns with an exploration of the experience of mass culture. As an attempt to make a connection between 'high' art and popular culture, Smith's work differs from the work of his British Pop contemporaries, who were more concerned with iconography. Smith stated that "My interest is not so much in the message as in the method"

In 1963 Smith progressed to an examination of the two-dimensional nature of painting. In Vista he added a shaped extension to the rectangular canvas, and in works such as Piano and Giftwrap progressed to extending the surface of the painting out into three-dimensional space. Despite the three-dimensional element of these works, Smith insisted on their identity as paintings: saying "Since I have always retained a wall, there is no question of a multifaceted sculptural object" Smith never produced any free standing sculptures, preferring to challenge the conventions of painting by working in an area between painting and sculpture.

In 1972 he exhibited the first of what are called the "kite paintings", in which rather than using a conventional stretcher the canvas is tensioned by cords and structures of aluminium tubing, which become an element in the composition of the works. This both reduced the strength of the edge of the canvas while at the same time drawing attention to its contour. Smith's new found interest in the edge of a picture is shown by the concentration of incident there in works such as 3 square 2.

The concerns of these works also appear in his small scale work of the time, where the paper was cut and folded, and often include elements fastened to the work by paper-clips or pieces of knotted string.

Works by Smith are in the collections of the Tate Britain, London, Museum of Modern Art, New York, and the Minneapolis Institute of Art, Minnesota.
