= Norton Common =

Local nature reserve in Letchworth Garden City, Hertfordshire, England

Coordinates: 51°59′07″N 0°13′36″W

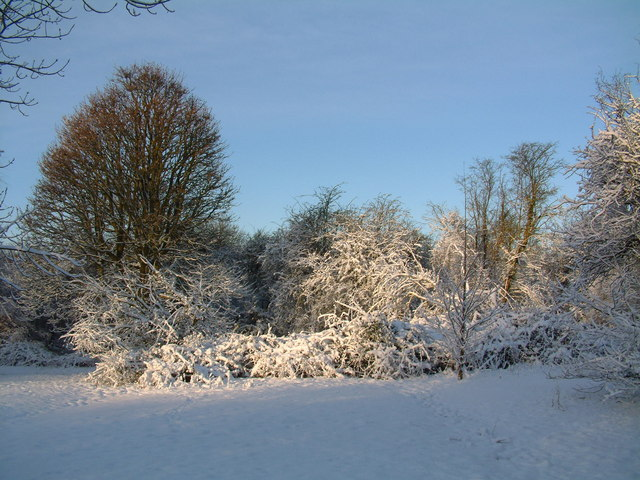
Trees on a snowy Norton Common

Norton Common is a 25.7-hectare park and Local Nature Reserve in the centre of Letchworth Garden City, Hertfordshire, England. It is owned and managed by North Hertfordshire District Council, and the declaring authority is Hertfordshire County Council.

The common has diverse wildlife including wildflowers in meadows, and black squirrel, muntjac deer, and birds such as chiffchaff and blackcap in woodland. The Pix Brook, which is fed by mineral-rich springs, provides areas of marshland.

Facilities provided at the Common include an outdoor swimming pool, bowling green, tennis courts and a skateboard arena. There is access from Icknield Way.
