= Letchworth Cemetery =

Cemetery in Hertfordshire, England

Coordinates: 51°58′45″N 0°15′01″W

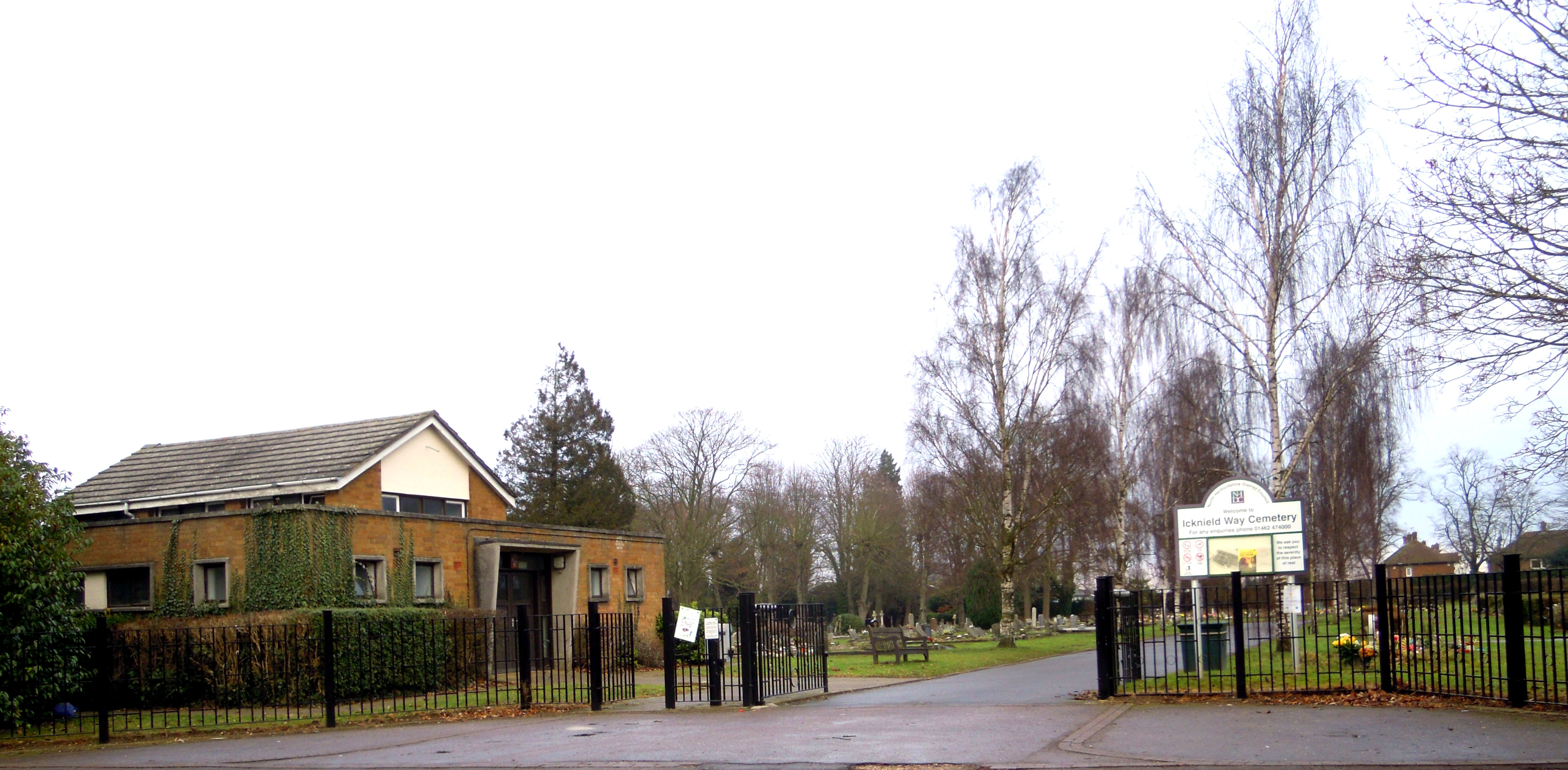
Entrance to Letchworth Cemetery with the Chapel on the left

Letchworth Cemetery (properly the Icknield Way Cemetery) was the first burial ground for Letchworth Garden City in Hertfordshire.

Letchworth's first cemetery and bordered by Icknield Way and Wilbury Hills Road, the cemetery is now closed for new burials but can be used if graves are being reopened and for prepurchased plots. Cremated remains are also still being interred at the cemetery. The car gates open and close automatically each day at dawn and dusk.

Letchworth Cemetery has a small chapel which is available for services for children's funerals and can seat about eight mourners. The chapel also houses the Book of Remembrance which is available to view every day of the year, either inside or through its position at a rear window. It has 15 military graves from World War II which are maintained by the Commonwealth War Graves Commission.

Today burials in Letchworth take place at the nearby Wilbury Hills Cemetery.

In 2013 the cemetery featured in an episode of the BBC series Who Do You Think You Are? when the actress Una Stubbs visited the grave of her great-grandfather, garden city pioneer Sir Ebenezer Howard.

== Notable burials ==
- Adrian Fortescue, Roman Catholic priest, liturgist, Byzantine scholar, and adventurer.
- William Henry Gaunt, English transport engineer.
- Ebenezer Howard, founder of the garden city movement.

== Gallery ==
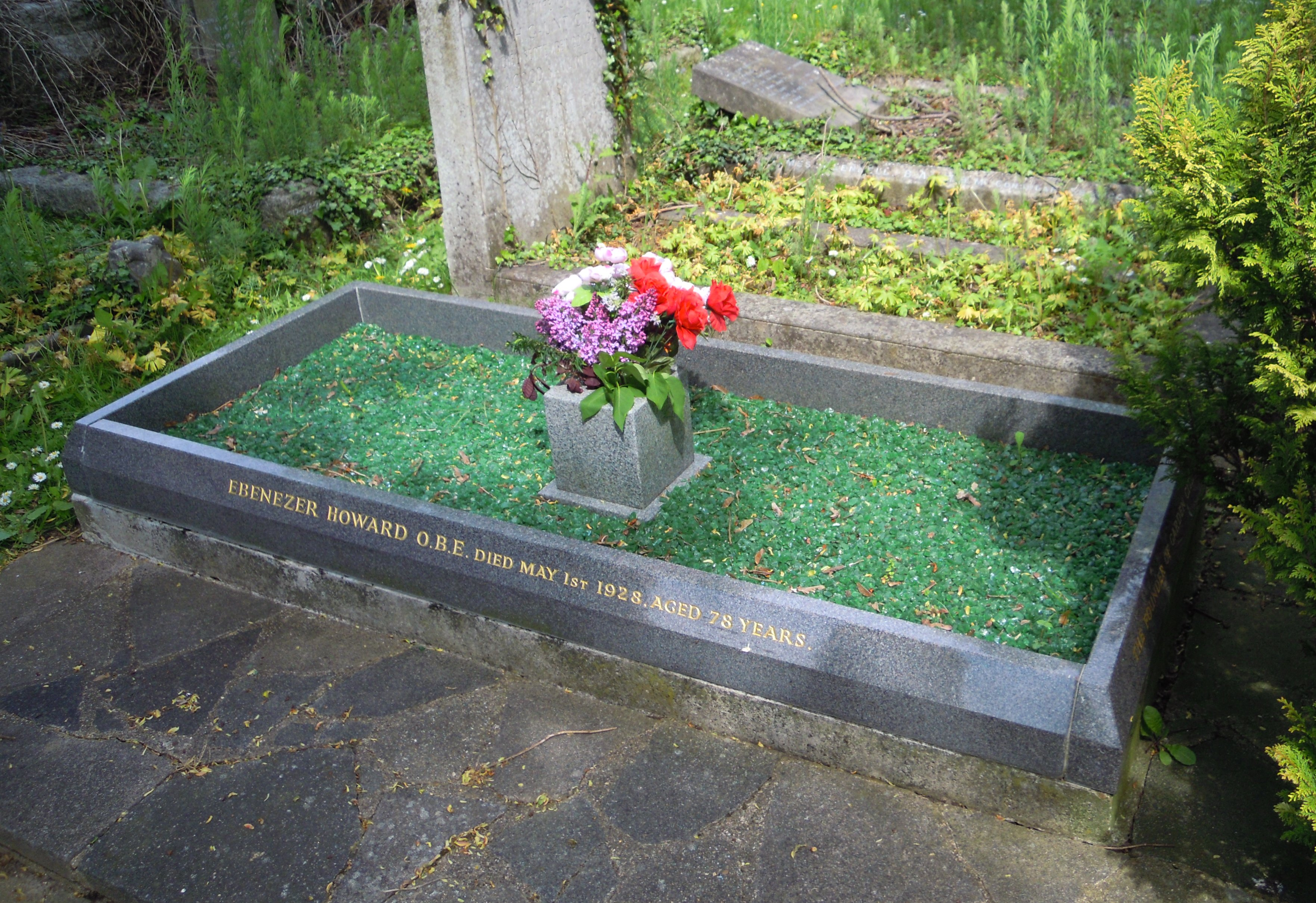
The grave of Sir Ebenezer Howard in Letchworth Cemetery

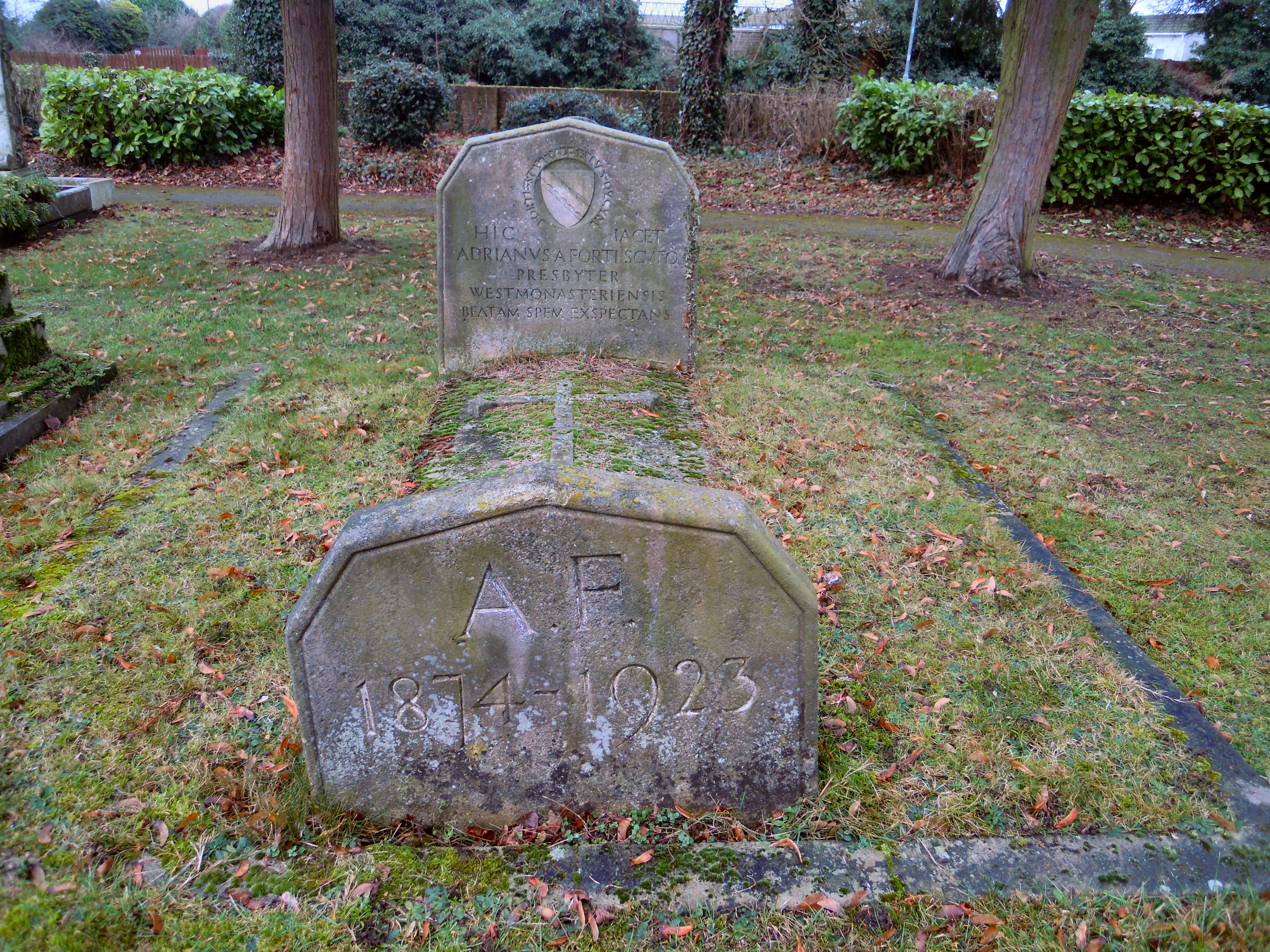
Grave of Adrian Fortescue

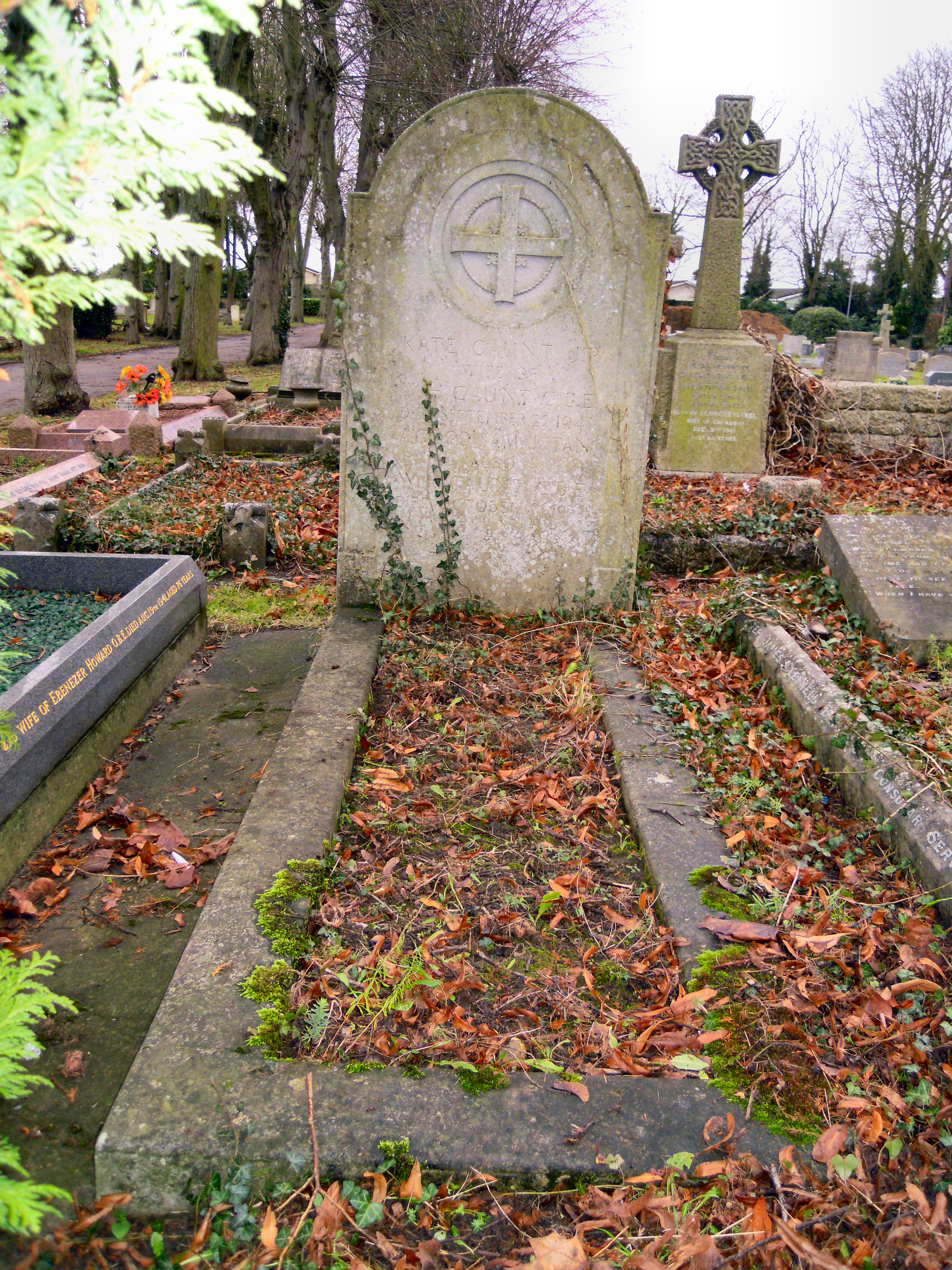
Grave of William Henry Gaunt

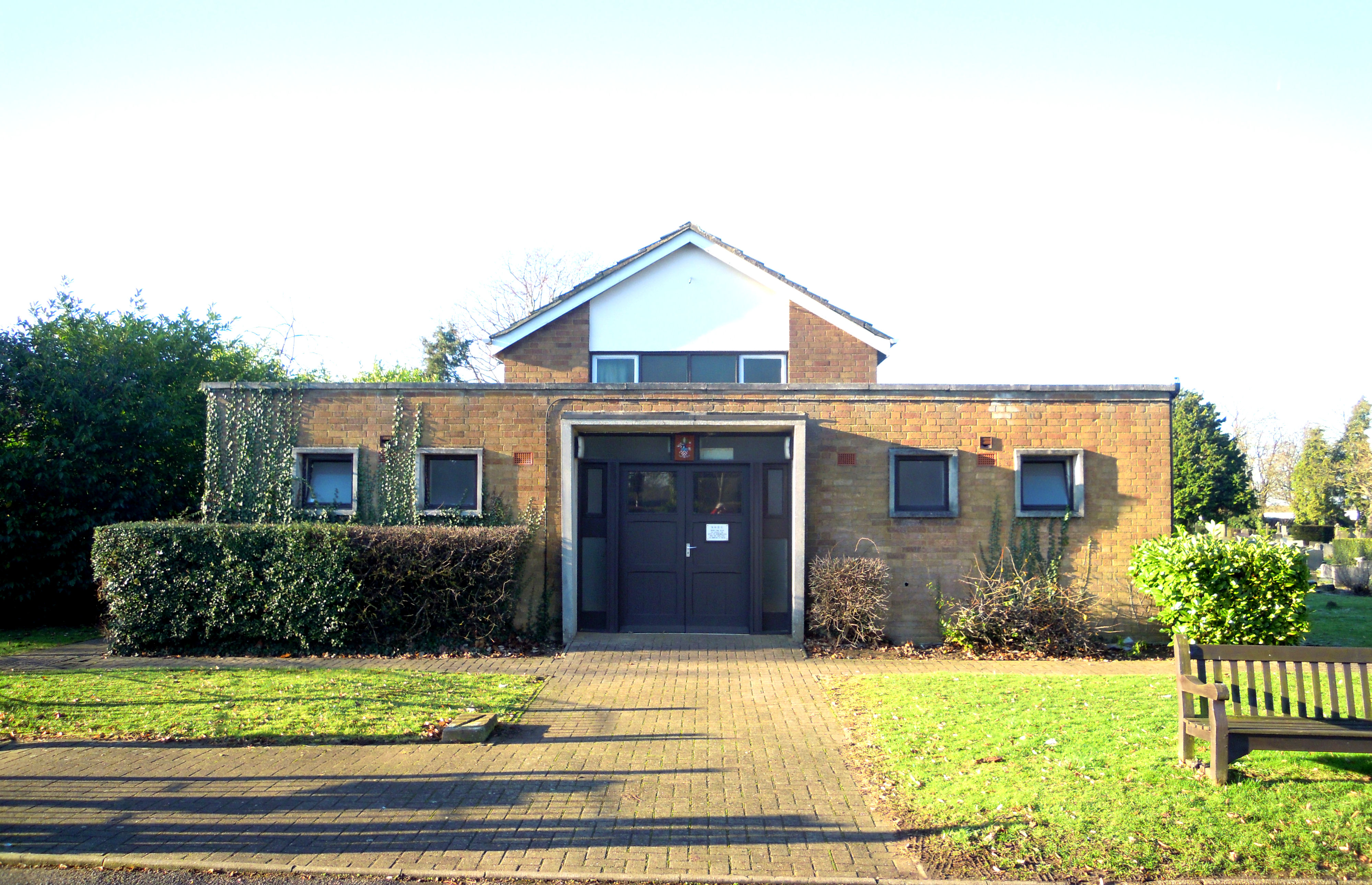
The Chapel at Letchworth Cemetery

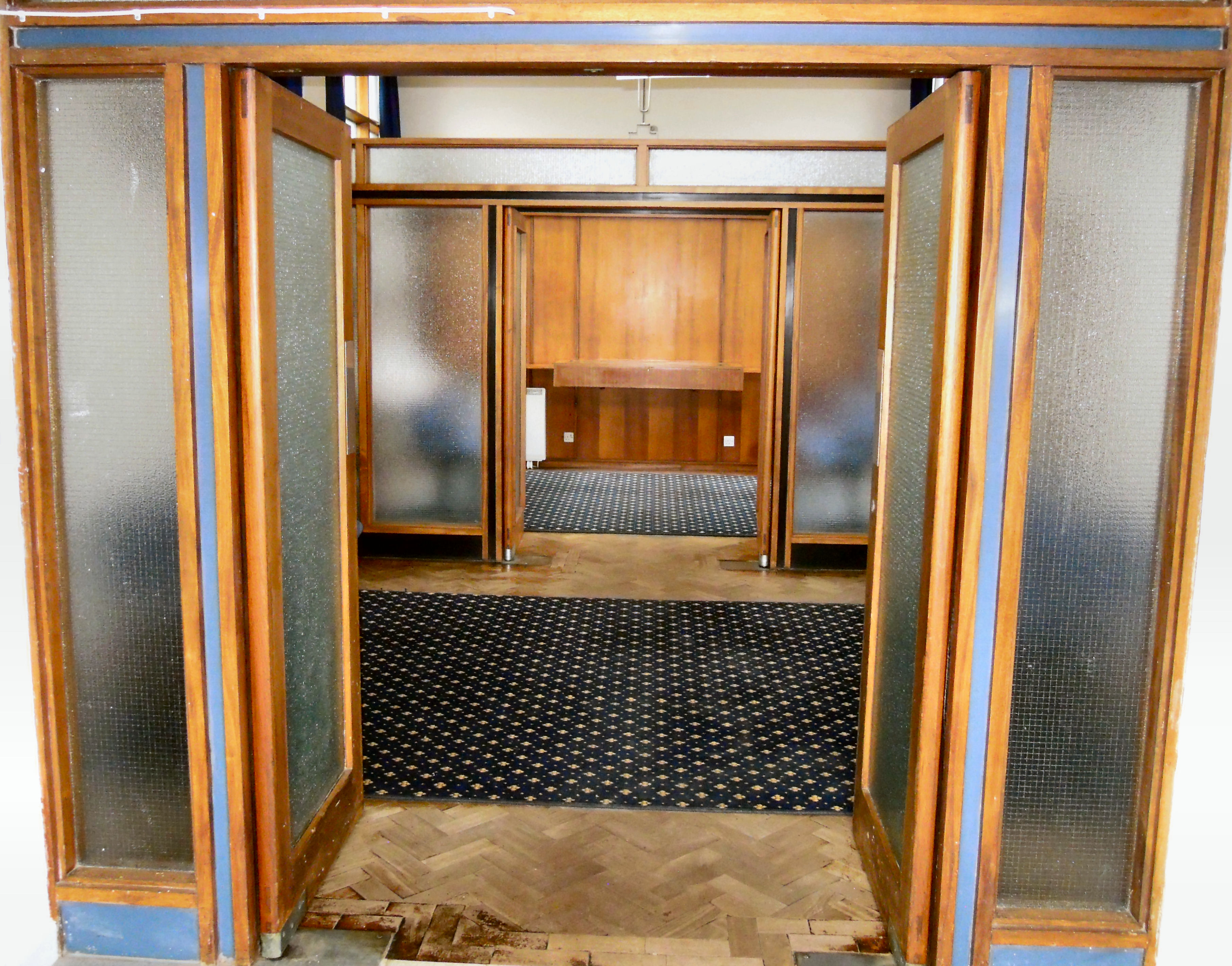
The interior of the Chapel
