= Letchworth Town Hall =

Municipal building in Letchworth, Hertfordshire, England

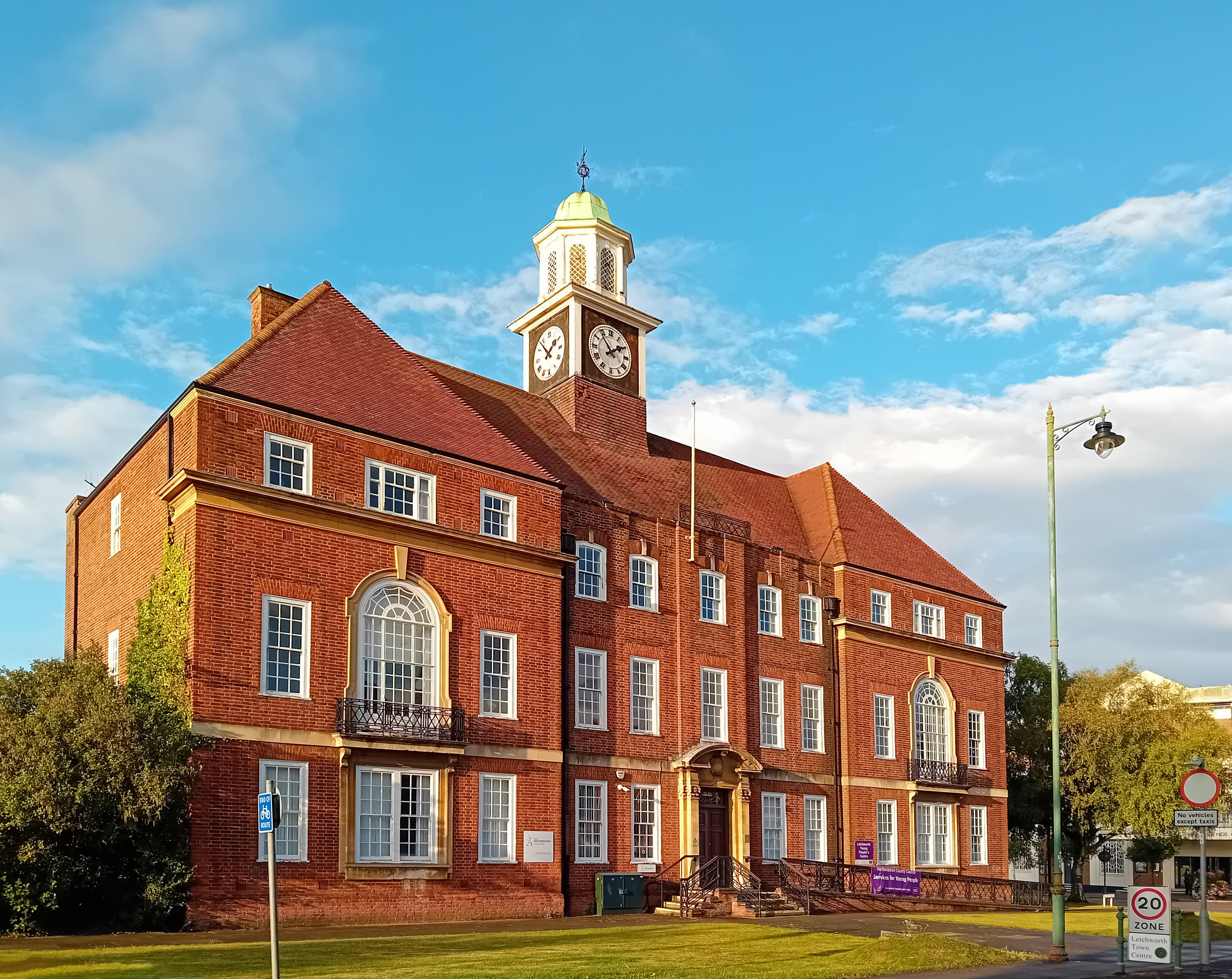
- Letchworth Town Hall

- Shown in Hertfordshire
- 51.9773°N 0.2296°W
- Location: Broadway, Letchworth

History
- Built: 1935

Site notes
- Architect(s): Robert Bennett and Wilson Bidwell
- Architectural style: Neo-Georgian style

Listed Building – Grade II
- Official name: Town Hall
- Designated: 16 December 2009
- Reference no.: 1393610

Letchworth Town Hall is a municipal building in Broadway, Letchworth, Hertfordshire, England. The town hall, which was the headquarters of Letchworth Urban District Council, is a Grade II listed building.

== History ==
Letchworth was developed in the early 20th century based on the ideas of the social reformer, Ebenezer Howard, and the master-planners, Richard Barry Parker and Raymond Unwin, around a boulevard known as Broadway, which formed the diagonal southwest-northeast axis of the proposed garden city. After significant population growth, in part associated with arrival of the Spirella Corset Company in the town, the area became an urban district in 1919. In this context civic leaders decided to procure a town hall: the site they selected was open land on the east side of Broadway. At the same time they established Broadway Gardens, which was initially known as the Town Square.

The new building was designed by Robert Bennett and Wilson Bidwell in the Neo-Georgian style, built in red brick with stone dressings and completed in 1935. The design involved a symmetrical main frontage with eleven bays facing the northeast corner of the Town Square with the wing sections slightly projected forward; the central section of five bays, featured a doorway with a fanlight flanked by Corinthian order pilasters supporting an open pediment on with a cartouche in the tympanum. The wing sections featured prominent round headed windows with cast iron balconies on the first floor. There were sash windows on the first and second floors and, at roof level, there was a clock tower with a cupola and a weather vane. Internally, the principal room was the council chamber, which was panelled, on the second floor. An electro-mechanical clock was installed in the tower to commemorate the life of Councillor Charles Francis Ball, who had died in June 1933, and in whose memory the Ball Memorial Gardens were also established to the east of Norton Way South in 1936. The building was initially called the "Council House", but was renamed the "Town Hall" in 1960.

The building continued to serve as the headquarters of Letchworth Urban District Council until 1974 when that council was abolished on the formation of North Hertfordshire District Council, which, shortly after its creation, established its headquarters in a new office building nearby on Gernon Road. Letchworth Town Hall continued to be used as additional office space for the new council until 2007, when it fell vacant.

After an extensive programme of restoration works to a design by Scott Brownrigg, the building was re-opened as an administrative centre for North Hertfordshire College in 2013. The clock in the clock tower, which by then had become one of the few remaining electro-mechanical clocks not to be replaced by an electrically motorised device, was restored in summer 2017.
