= Broadway, Letchworth =

Road and green space in Letchworth, Hertfordshire, England

Broadway
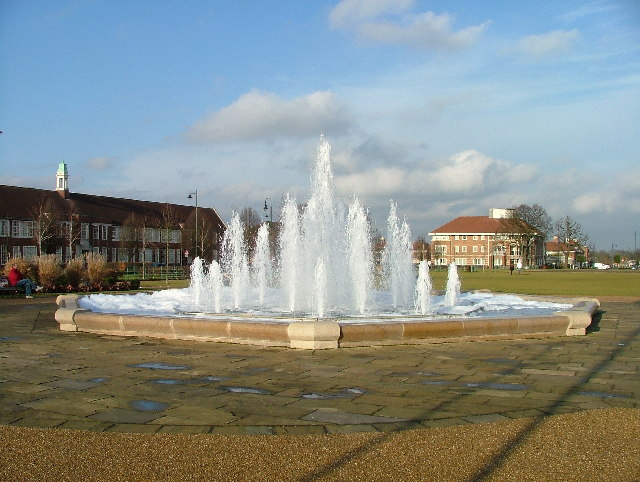
- The fountain in Broadway Gardens
- Interactive map of Broadway
- Location: Letchworth
- OS grid: TL 21566 32074
- Coordinates: 51°58′26″N 0°13′54″W
- Designation: Grade II

Broadway is a road through the centre of Letchworth, in Hertfordshire, England, laid out when the garden city of Letchworth was created. It incorporates Broadway Gardens, and is listed Grade II in Historic England's Register of Parks and Gardens.

== History ==
Ebenezer Howard pioneered the idea of creating garden cities; they would benefit the whole community, they would be well planned and integrate the best aspects of town and country. The first garden city was Letchworth, on a site acquired in 1903. It was planned in 1904 by the architects Barry Parker and Raymond Unwin. This included a broad spinal approach road from the south and north, named Broadway, leading to Town Square, where the principle buildings of the town would be erected. Lombardy poplars were planted about 1914 to show the location of the buildings, which in the course of events were never built.

The section from Hitchin Road northwards to the roundabout was the first part of Broadway to be constructed, about 1906; along this section are large detached houses, built from 1905 to 1912. The roundabout, Sollershott Circus, opened in 1910, was the first in the United Kingdom. The section between the roundabout and Town Square was an unmade road until 1924.

About 450 metres (1,480 ft) to the east of Broadway is Howard Park and Gardens, also part of the original layout of the town.

== Description ==
Broadway is 1.5 kilometres (0.93 mi) long, running south-south-west to north-north-east. The southern end is the junction with Hitchin Road (the A505 road); Station Place, the forecourt of the railway station, is at the northern end. Broad grass verges flank the road from Hitchen Road to Broadway Gardens. About 300 metres (980 ft) north of Hitchin Road is the roundabout, Sollershott Circus, the convergence of several residential roads.

Broadway Gardens (originally named Town Square and later, from the mid-1960s, John F Kennedy Gardens) is 850 metres (2,790 ft) north of Hitchin Road. It was developed in recent years with a grant from the Heritage Lottery Fund. There is a fountain, herbaceous borders and a large open space where events can be hosted. Overlooking the gardens are the Town Hall (built in 1935), the library (1938), the town museum (1914–20) and the former grammar school (1931). Broadway passes the Gardens on both sides; north of the Gardens, Broadway is divided by a central boulevard where a tramway was originally intended, now a central walk.
