= Letchworth =

Town in Hertfordshire, England

Coordinates: 51°58′41″N 0°13′48″W

Letchworth Garden City
- Town
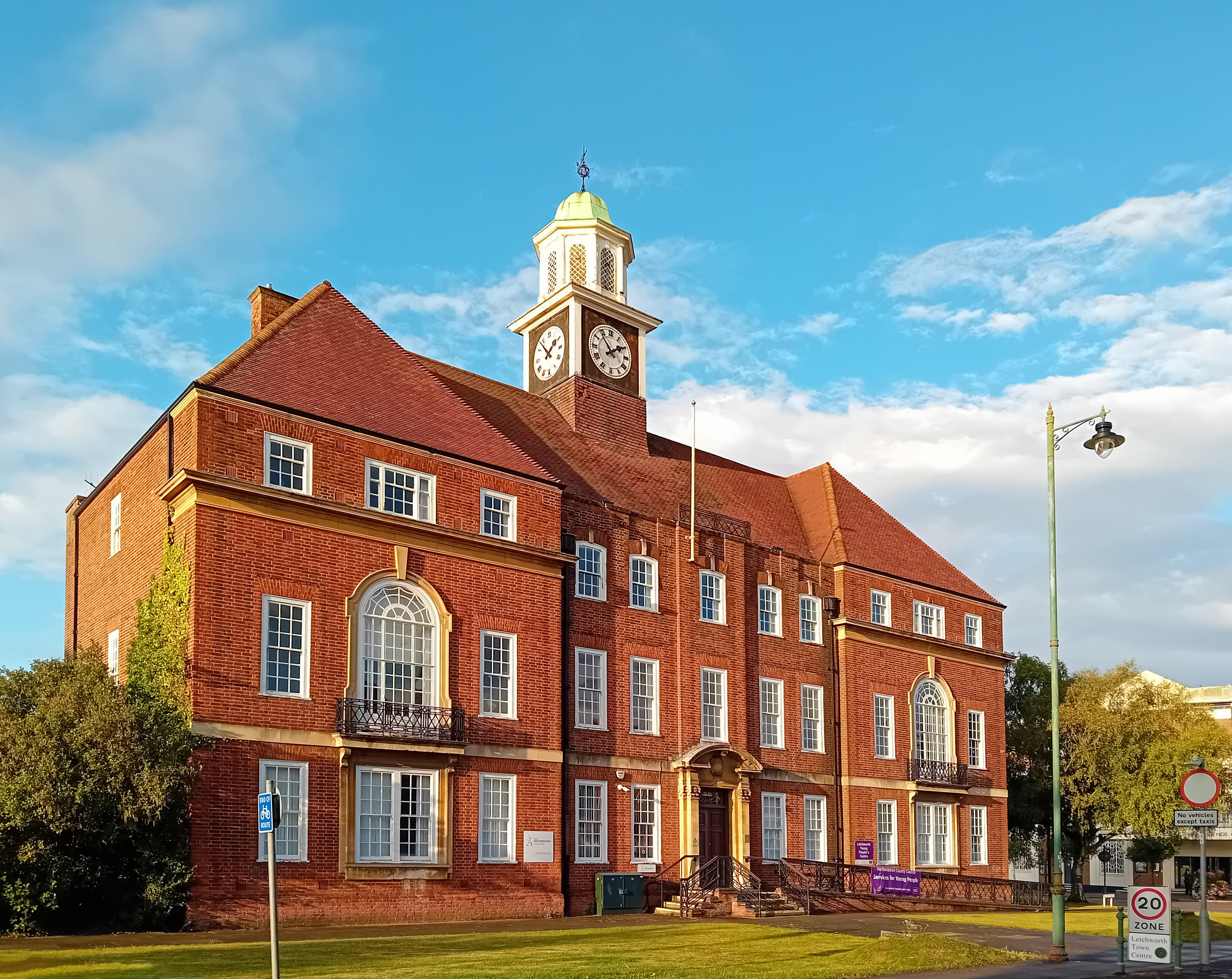
- Letchworth Town Hall

- Location within Hertfordshire
- Population: 33,990 (Built up area, 2021)
- OS grid reference: TL215325
- District: North Hertfordshire
- Shire county: Hertfordshire
- Region: East
- Country: England
- Sovereign state: United Kingdom
- Post town: Letchworth Garden City
- Postcode district: SG6
- Dialling code: 01462
- Police: Hertfordshire
- Fire: Hertfordshire
- Ambulance: East of England
- UK Parliament: North East Hertfordshire

Letchworth Garden City, commonly known as Letchworth (/lɛtʃwəθ/), is a town in the North Hertfordshire district of Hertfordshire, England. It is noted for being the first garden city. At the 2021 census the built up area had a population of 33,990.

Letchworth was an ancient parish, appearing in the Domesday Book of 1086. It remained a small rural village until the start of the twentieth century. The development of the modern town began in 1903, when much of the land in Letchworth and the neighbouring parishes of Willian and Norton was purchased by a company called First Garden City Limited, founded by Ebenezer Howard and his supporters with the aim of building the first "garden city", following the principles Howard had set out in his 1898 book, To-morrow: A Peaceful Path to Real Reform. Their aim was to create a new type of settlement which provided jobs, services, and good housing for residents, whilst retaining the environmental quality of the countryside, in contrast to most industrial cities of the time.

The town's initial layout was designed by Raymond Unwin and Barry Parker. It includes the United Kingdom's first roundabout, Sollershott Circus, which was built c. 1909. The layout for Letchworth incorporates extensive parkland and open spaces, including Norton Common and Howard Park.

A takeover of First Garden City Limited in 1960 led to significant changes in how the company managed the town, which were opposed by the residents and local council who wanted the original garden city ideals retained. They secured an act of parliament which transferred ownership of the estate from the company to a public sector body, the Letchworth Garden City Corporation, in 1963. The corporation in turn was replaced by a charitable body in 1995, the Letchworth Garden City Heritage Foundation, which owns and manages the estate today.

Letchworth today retains large business areas providing jobs in a variety of sectors, and the landlord's profits are reinvested for the benefit of the community by the Heritage Foundation. The town lies 32 miles (51 km) north of London, on the railway linking London to Cambridge, and it also adjoins the A1 road, making it relatively popular with commuters. Residential areas in the town are mixed; large parts of the town are included in conservation areas in recognition of their quality, but the town also contains four of the five poorest-scoring neighbourhoods in North Hertfordshire for deprivation.

As the world's first garden city, Letchworth has had a notable impact on town planning and the new towns movement; it influenced nearby Welwyn Garden City, which used a similar approach, and aspects of the principles demonstrated at Letchworth have been incorporated into other projects around the world including the Australian capital Canberra, Hellerau in Germany, Tapiola in Finland and Mežaparks in Latvia.

== History ==
=== Before the Garden City: Old Letchworth ===
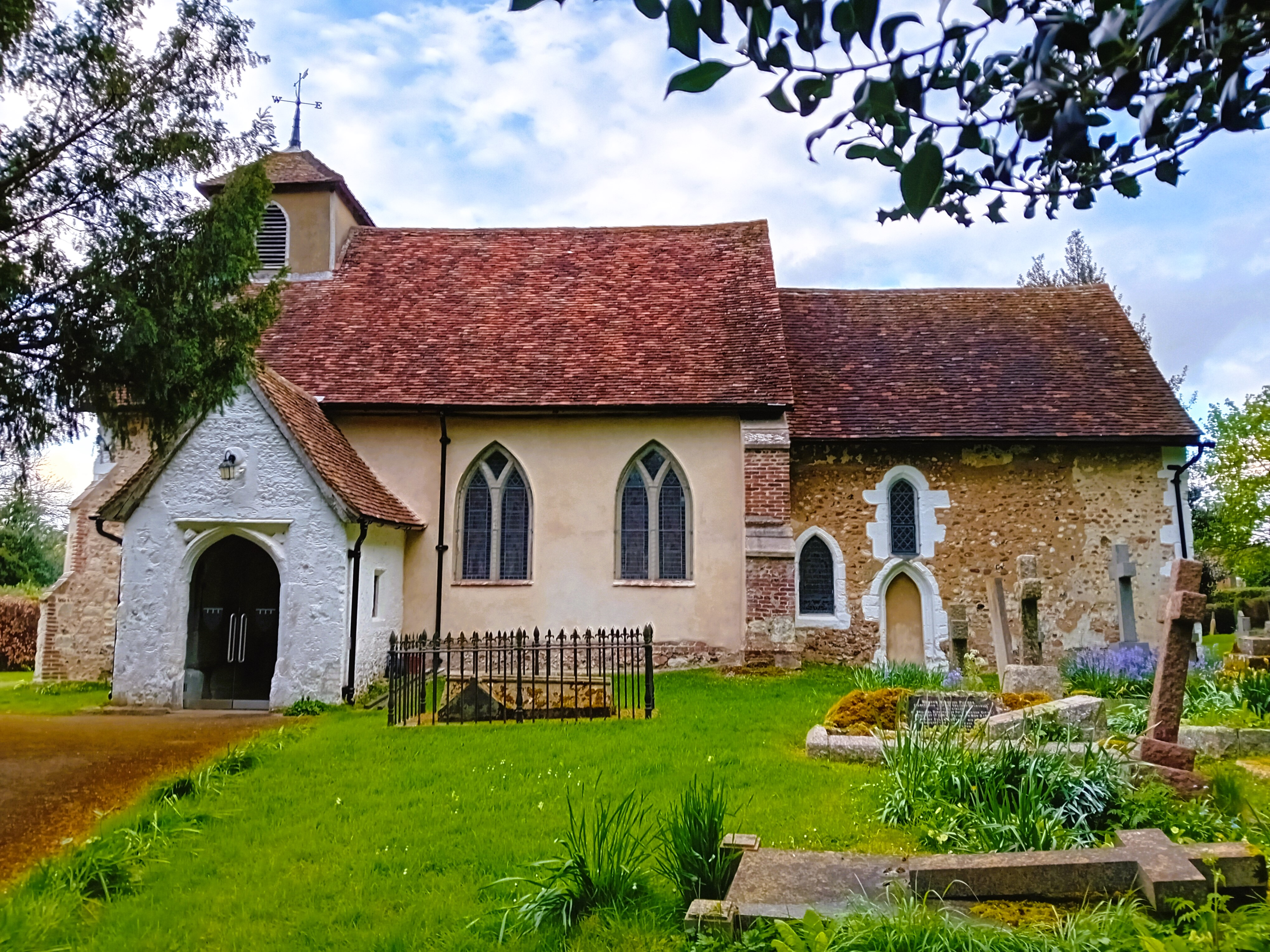
St Mary's Church, Letchworth

The area now occupied by Letchworth has been inhabited since prehistoric times. A late Bronze Age hill fort, thought to date from c. 700 BC, stood on Wilbury Hill, beside the ancient road of Icknield Way. The hill fort was refortified c. 400 BC in the Middle Iron Age, and appears to have been occupied until the Roman conquest of Britain. Evidence for Bronze Age, Romano-British and late Iron Age settlement has also been found in the fields between Norton village and the A1.

By the time of the Norman Conquest, Letchworth was established as a village. The name is derived from the Old English "lycce weorth", meaning a farm inside a fence or enclosure. It appears in the Domesday Book of 1086 as "Leceworde", when it was described as having nine households of villagers, four cottagers, one slave and one priest. The presence of the priest suggests that Letchworth was by that time a parish. Letchworth's parish church was built in the 12th century, but likely on the site of an earlier building. The original dedication of the church is unknown, but it was rededicated to St Mary during the First World War. The village was along Letchworth Lane, stretching from St Mary's and the adjoining medieval manor house of Letchworth Hall up to the staggered crossroads of Letchworth Lane, Hitchin Road, Baldock Road and Spring Road. Letchworth was a relatively small parish, having a population in 1801 of 67, rising to 96 by 1901.

=== The early days of the Garden City ===
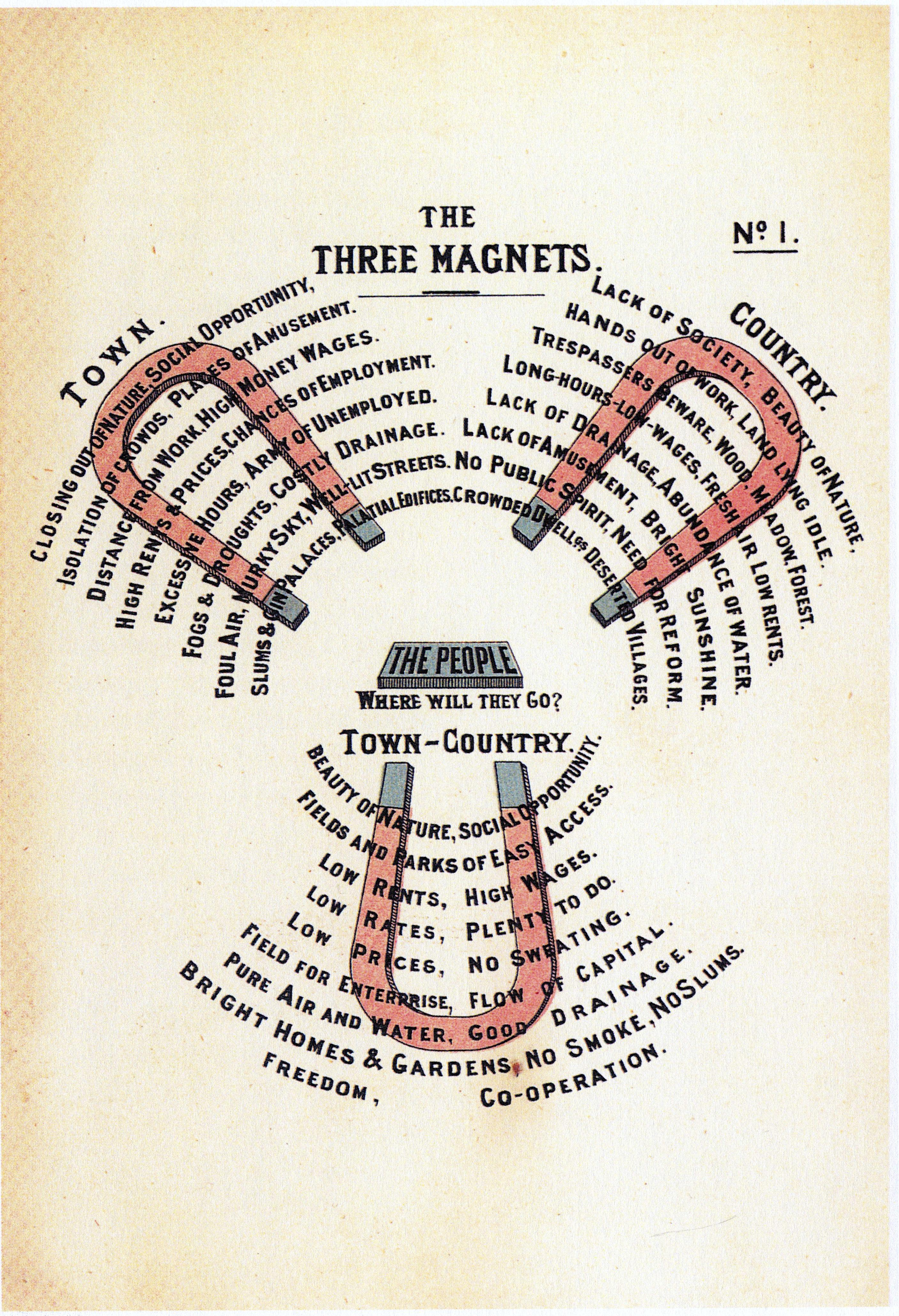
Howard's depiction of the choice of town design as a contest between three magnets (select image for transcript)

In 1898, the social reformer Ebenezer Howard wrote To-morrow: A Peaceful Path to Real Reform (republished in 1902 as Garden Cities of To-morrow), in which he advocated the construction of a new kind of town, which he called a "garden city". The idea was summed up in a diagram called the "Three Magnets", showing how the mixed advantages and disadvantages of town or country living could be combined into a third option, "Town-Country", offering the advantages of both cities and the countryside while eliminating their disadvantages. Industry would be kept separate from residential areas, whilst the residents would have good access to parks and the countryside. The garden city would be contained in a belt of open countryside, providing land not just for agriculture, but also for children's homes, asylums, new forests and brickfields. Echoes of this idea of a protected rural belt were later taken up more generally in town planning in Britain from the mid-twentieth century as the green belt.

Howard's ideas were mocked in some sections of the press but struck a chord with many, especially members of the Arts and Crafts movement and the Quakers. After examining several possible locations for establishing a garden city, the garden city pioneers settled on Letchworth as the chosen site. The Letchworth Hall estate had come up for sale, and although it alone was too small, secret negotiations with fourteen adjoining landowners allowed an estate of 3,818 acres (1,545 hectares) to be assembled and purchased for £155,587. A company called First Garden City Limited was established on 1 September 1903 to purchase the land and begin building the garden city.

In 1904, architects Raymond Unwin and Barry Parker won a competition for designing the town's layout, and were appointed as consulting architects to the company. Most of the pre-existing trees and hedgerows were preserved in the layout. Unwin took the alignment of the town's main avenue (Broadway) from three old oak trees which stood on the central plateau of the estate and were incorporated into the central square (Broadway Gardens).

A temporary railway halt was built in 1903 on the Great Northern Railway's Hitchin, Royston and Cambridge branch line, which crosses the middle of the garden city estate. Initially, services were irregular special trains for excursions and construction workers. A more substantial temporary wooden station was opened in 1905 with a regular passenger service. The current railway station was built in 1912 in a prominent location at the end of Broadway.

The first new houses were occupied in July 1904. The following month First Garden City Limited held a vote amongst shareholders and residents on what name the new garden city should take. Several options were proposed, including "Garden City", "Homeworth" and "Alseopolis". The chosen name was "Letchworth (Garden City)". The company adopted this as its name for the town, but adoption of the name was not universal. The legal name of the civil parish and (after 1919) urban district remained simply "Letchworth". First Garden City Limited also gradually dropped the "(Garden City)" suffix from the name, partly reflecting common usage, and partly taking the view that as the town matured it should not permanently be seen as an experiment. Similarly, the town's railway station was initially called "Letchworth (Garden City)", but was renamed "Letchworth" in 1937. The station is now known as Letchworth Garden City, with direct trains to Brighton via St Pancras International and terminating trains to King's Cross to the South, and Cambridge and King's Lynn to the North.

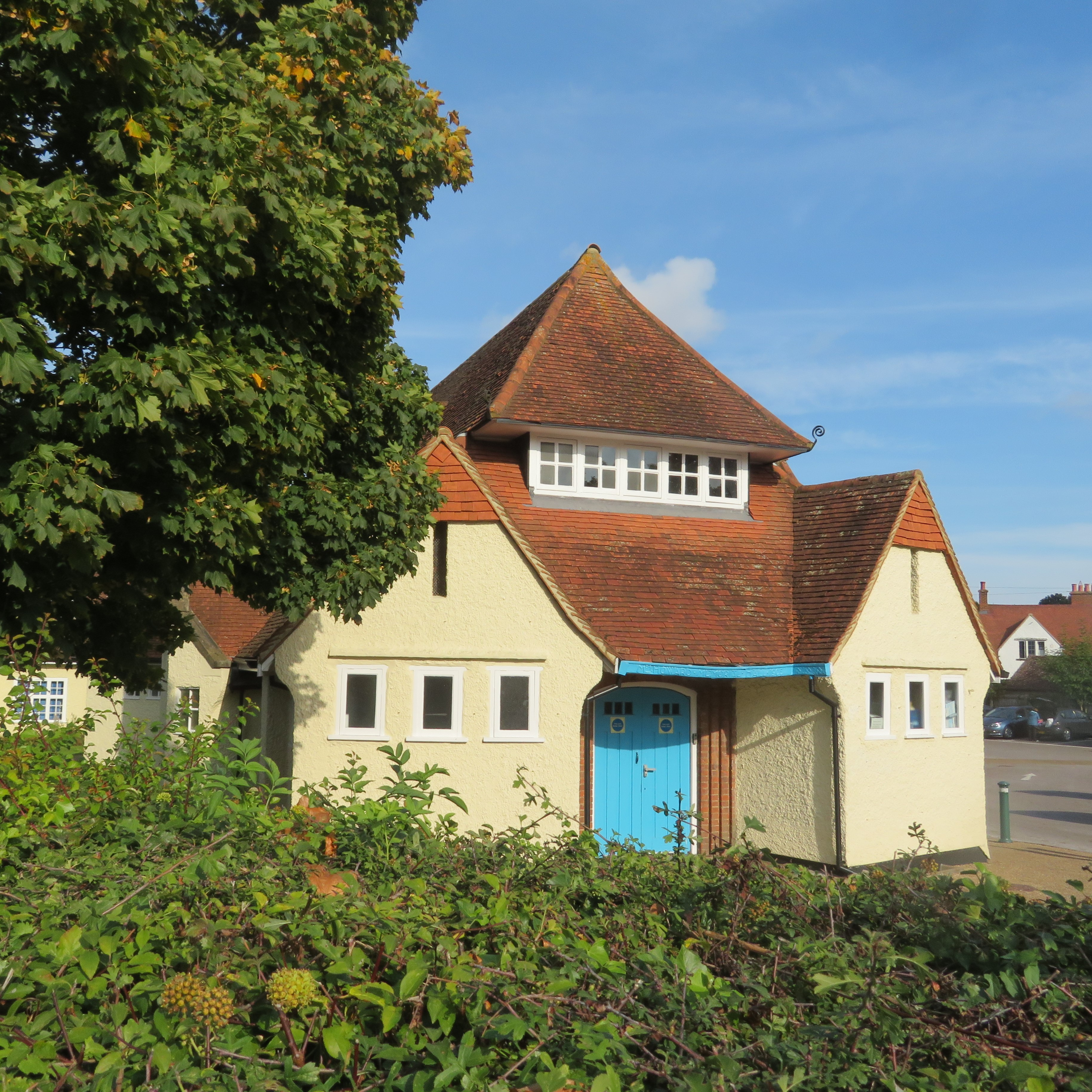
Mrs Howard Memorial Hall, opened 1906

Ebenezer Howard's wife, Lizzie (Eliza Ann Bills), died in November 1904 in London, shortly before she had been due to move to a new house in Letchworth with her husband. As a memorial to her a public hall was built, paid for by public subscriptions. The Mrs Howard Memorial Hall opened in 1906 and was one of the town's first public buildings.

In 1905, and again in 1907, the company held "Cheap Cottages Exhibitions", which were contests for architects and builders to demonstrate innovations in inexpensive housing. The 1905 exhibition attracted some 60,000 visitors. The popularity of the exhibitions was significant in leading the Daily Mail to launch the Ideal Home Exhibition (which later became the Ideal Home Show), in 1908. One possible visitor to the fledgling town was Lenin, who was reputed to have visited during May 1907 whilst attending the Fifth Congress of the Russian Social Democratic Labour Party in London. Contemporary evidence confirming the visit is lacking, but the claim was published in the Daily Mail and the Daily Sketch in November 1916 as part of articles accusing the town of being a haven for communists and conscientious objectors—claims which the town denied.

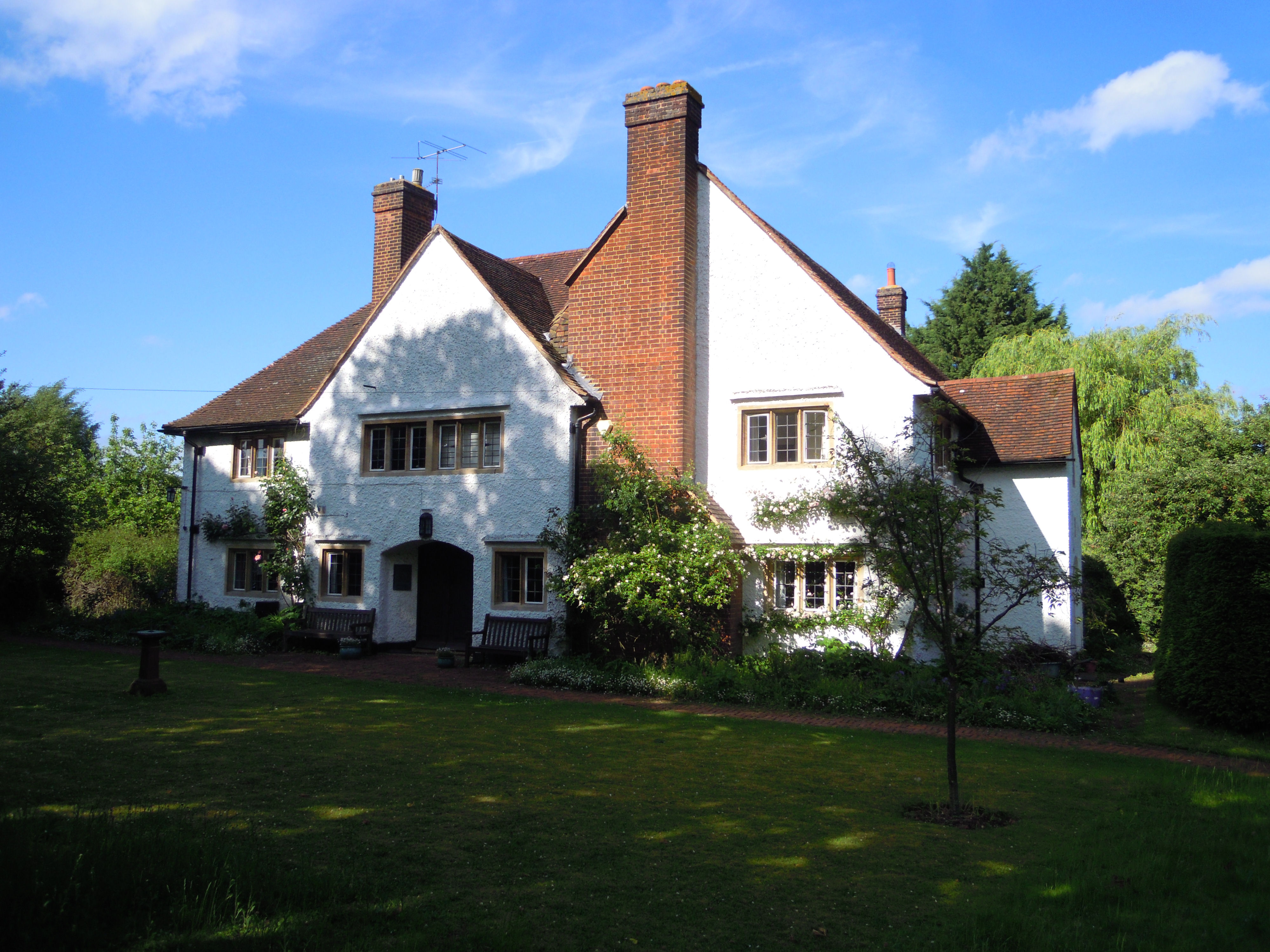
Howgills, the Quakers' Meeting House of 1907

For the first few years, the new town's Anglicans had to use the old parish churches at Letchworth village, Willian or Norton on the edges of the estate. Many of the town's pioneers had non-conformist leanings, in keeping with the radical spirit of the early town. The first new place of worship to be built was the Free Church, built in 1905 (later rebuilt in 1923). It was followed in 1907 by 'Howgills', the Meeting House for the Society of Friends.

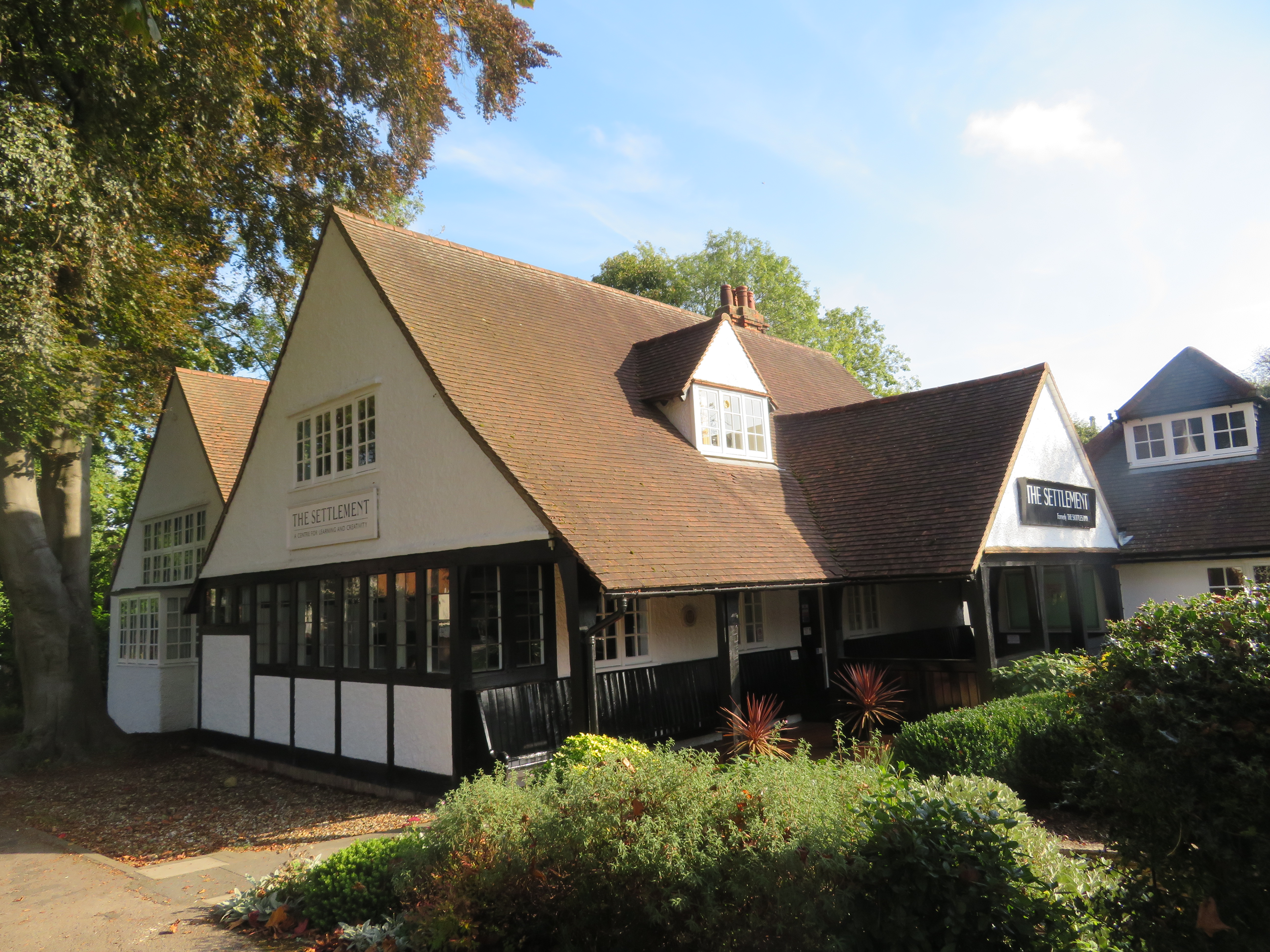
The Skittles Inn, opened 1907. Became "The Settlement", an adult education centre, in 1925.

Letchworth's founding citizens, attracted by the promise of a better life, were often caricatured by outsiders as idealistic and otherworldly. John Betjeman in his poems Group Life: Letchworth and Huxley Hall painted Letchworth people as earnest health freaks. One commonly-cited example of this is the ban, most unusual for a British town, on selling alcohol in public premises. This was initially decided by a public vote in June 1907, in which 54% voted against allowing a licensed public house. This did not stop the town having a "pub" however – the Skittles Inn or the "pub with no beer" which opened in March 1907.

Despite the ban it is not entirely true to say that there were no pubs in the Garden City. Pubs that had existed from before the foundation of the Garden City continued to operate, including the Three Horseshoes in Norton and the Three Horseshoes and the Fox in Willian, and benefited from the lack of alcohol to be had in the centre of the town, as did the pubs in neighbouring Hitchin and Baldock. New inns also sprang up on the borders of the town, including the Wilbury Hotel which opened in 1940 just outside the town's border. The ban was finally lifted after a referendum in 1957, which led to the opening of the Broadway Hotel in 1962 as the first public house in the centre of the Garden City. Several other public houses have opened since then, but to this day the town centre has relatively few pubs for a town of its size.

=== Industry ===
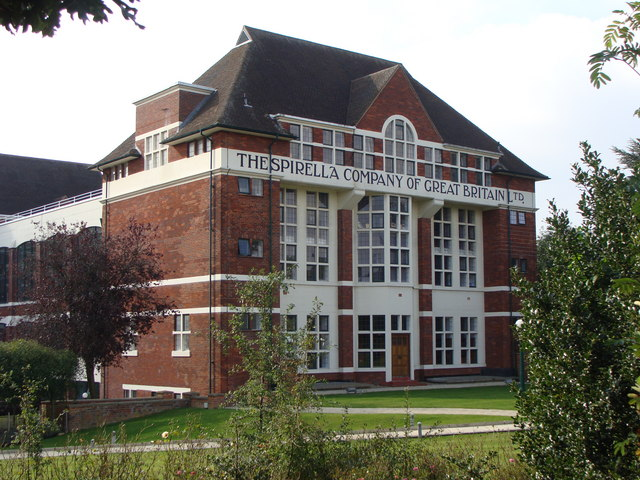
The Spirella Building

One of the most prominent industries to arrive in the town in the early years was the manufacture of corsets; the Spirella Company, an American business, founded its British subsidiary in the town in 1910. In 1912, they built the first phase of a large factory, the Spirella Building, designed by Cecil Hignett in the Arts and Crafts style. It was completed in 1920. The building's prominence in the town led to it being nicknamed "Castle Corset". During the Second World War, the factory also produced parachutes and decoding machinery.

The town attracted and developed a diverse range of industries. Other significant early businesses included:

- J. M. Dent and Son, publishing house, moved to Letchworth from London in 1907.
- Kryn & Lahy Steel Foundry founded in 1915 by Belgian refugees, and which was a target for German bombers in World War II.
- Irvin Great Britain, a parachute factory established in the town in 1926 as the British subsidiary of an American company.
- Shelvoke and Drewry, a manufacturer of dustcarts and fire engines which was founded in the town in 1922 and traded until 1991.
- Westinghouse Morse Chain Company, making parts for engines, set up in Letchworth in 1920, later becoming part of Borg-Warner after the Second World War.

The biggest employer for a number of years was the British Tabulating Machine Company, which moved from London to Letchworth in 1920. In 1958, it merged with Powers-Samas to become International Computers and Tabulators (ICT) and finally became part of International Computers Limited (ICL) in 1969.

A power station was built in the 1920s on Works Road to supply electricity. There were two coal-fired generators, called Letchworth A and Letchworth B, with rated outputs of 8 megawatts (MW) and 13 MW respectively. Letchworth A was decommissioned in 1968, followed by Letchworth B in 1974. A gas turbine power station was then built on the site, with two 70 MW turbines and two reinforced concrete chimneys. The first turbine was commissioned in 1978. Output peaked during the 1984–1985 miners' strike. The power station was demolished in 2007.

During the 1970s and 1980s, many of the town's large manufacturing businesses closed. The Kryn and Lahy Steel Foundry closed in 1979. Spirella and ICL both closed their factories in 1989. Borg-Warner also closed its factory during this period. The town went through a period of relatively high unemployment in the early 1980s. Some of the vacated factory sites were redeveloped as business parks and serviced offices, and the town's economy shifted away from a small number of large manufacturing businesses to a large number of smaller office-based businesses.

=== Housing ===
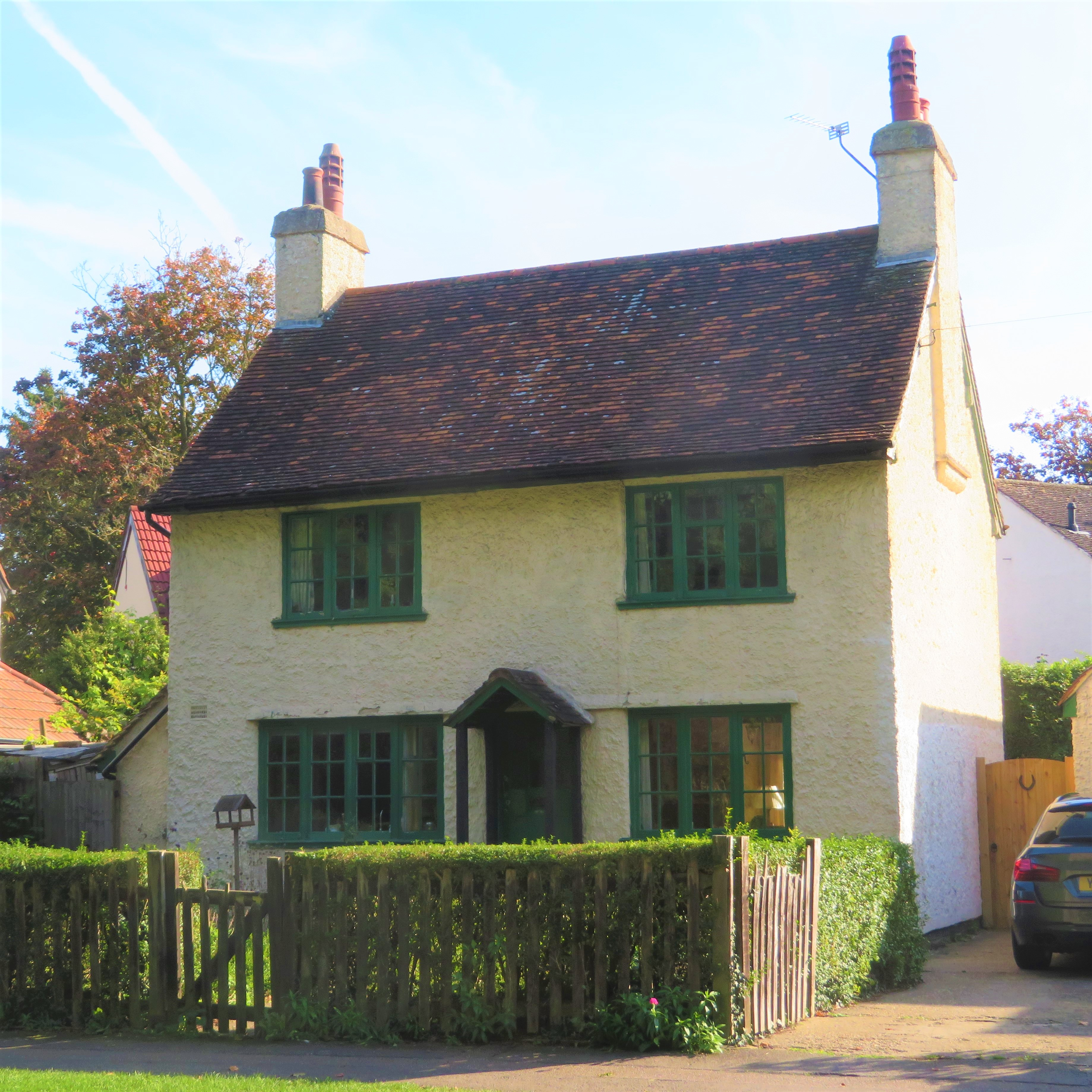
217 Icknield Way: Winner of best £150 cottage competition at the 1905 Cheap Cottages Exhibition.

Early housing development in Letchworth largely followed Unwin and Parker's masterplan. The first houses built after the founding of the garden city were a group of six houses called "Alpha Cottages" at 22–32 Baldock Road, where the first residents moved in during July 1904. Much of the town's early housing was to the east of the nascent town centre, within walking distance of the main industrial area on the eastern edge of the town. Many houses were built in a modest cottage style, finished with cream painted render, green doors, and clay-tiled roofs. To the south-west of the town centre towards Letchworth village was an area of larger individually-designed houses for the upper middle classes.

After the Second World War the focus for new development was on large council estates. To the north of the town work began on the Grange estate in 1947. The estate included its own primary schools, recreation ground, public house and a neighbourhood shopping centre. The land for the estate was compulsorily purchased from First Garden City Limited by Letchworth Urban District Council. In 1959, land to the south-east of the town was also compulsorily purchased for the development of the Jackmans estate, another large council estate, with funding provided by London County Council as the area was to accommodate London overspill. The Jackmans estate was developed on the "Radburn principle" which had been pioneered in Radburn, New Jersey, a town which was itself inspired by the garden city movement. The idea was to minimise the impact of traffic by having houses face onto pedestrian-only green lanes and open spaces, with parking and servicing provided in garage courts behind the houses.

Private housing resumed more slowly after the Second World War, partly due to the tight controls on building materials and licences which were imposed and remained in force until 1954. As these restrictions eased, additional areas of private housing were built to the south of the town. This area south of the town was significantly enlarged by the Lordship and Manor Park estates, begun in 1971. Following the completion of these developments in the 1980s, most new housing in the town has been on previously-developed land, as sites vacated by closed schools and businesses have been redeveloped.

=== UK's first roundabout ===
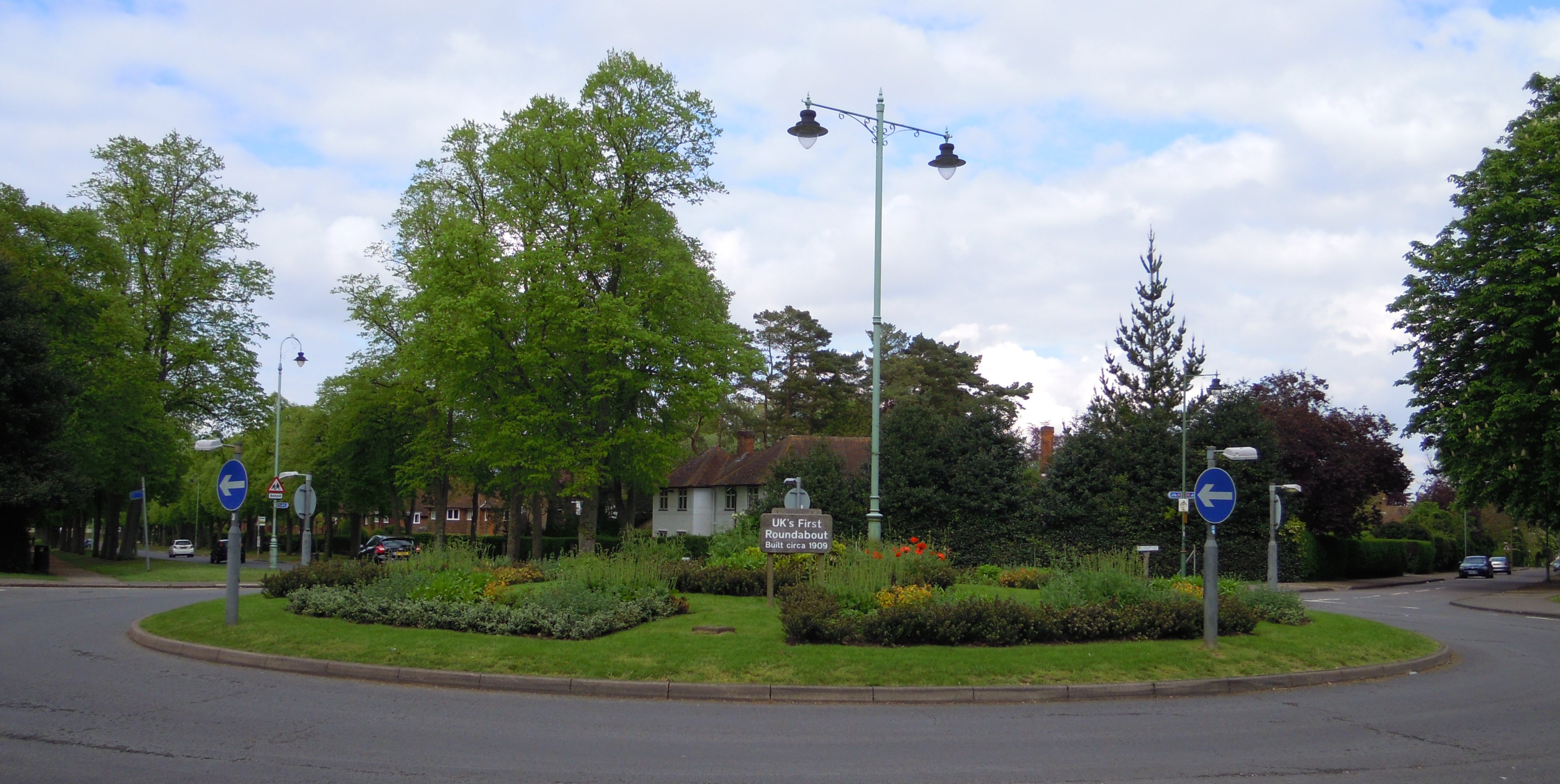
Sollershott Circus, the United Kingdom's first roundabout

Innovation in Letchworth was not confined to the design of buildings. The 1904 layout plan included a point on the main avenue where six roads converged, with the roads later being named Broadway, Spring Road, and Sollershott. Plans drawn up in July 1908 proposed a circular traffic island at this point, influenced by the Place de l'Étoile in Paris, which Unwin wrote about in 1909. The Letchworth roundabout is known to have been in use by 1910. When first built, traffic could circulate around the central island in both directions; the instruction to keep left was not added until 1921. It was named "Sollershott Circus" and is recognised as the first roundabout on a public road in the United Kingdom. Two signs were erected on the roundabout in 2006 saying "UK's First Roundabout Built circa 1909" This was after a petition was made by Andrew White of Letchworth for a school project.

=== Wider impact of garden city ===
As the world's first garden city, Letchworth had a notable influence on town planning and the new towns movement in the twentieth century. It directly influenced Welwyn Garden City, founded by Ebenezer Howard in 1920 using a similar model to Letchworth, and Hampstead Garden Suburb, founded in 1906 and also designed to a layout by Raymond Unwin and Barry Parker. Aspects of Letchworth's approach to blending town and county were subsequently used in the Australian capital Canberra, Hellerau in Germany, Tapanila in Finland and Mežaparks in Latvia.

=== Letchworth today ===
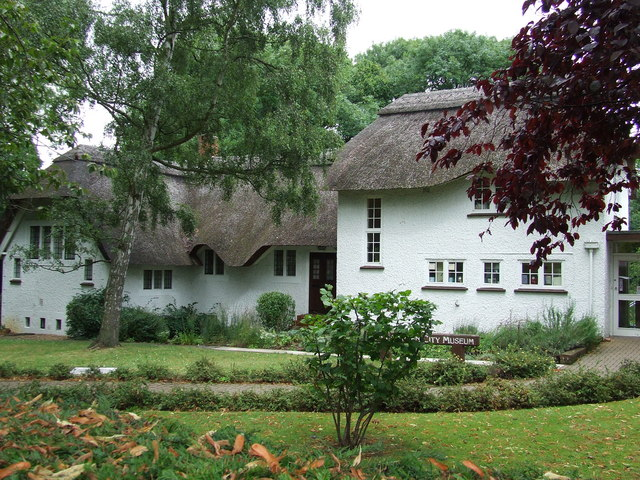
First Garden City Heritage Museum

Ownership of the estate passed from First Garden City Limited to the Letchworth Garden City Corporation in 1963, which in turn was replaced in 1995 by the Letchworth Garden City Heritage Foundation. The estate eventually started yielding a financial surplus which could be used for the benefit of the town in 1973. This led to investment in a number of town amenities, including a working farm tourist attraction opened at Standalone Farm (1980), the North Herts Leisure Centre (1982), and a free hospital, the Ernest Gardiner Day Hospital (1984). The Broadway cinema was extensively refurbished in 1996, and the Heritage Foundation has also supported several projects to enhance the town centre.

Large parts of the town are included in conservation areas in recognition of their quality, but the town also contains four of the five poorest-scoring neighbourhoods in North Hertfordshire for deprivation, in parts of the Jackmans estate, Grange estate and Wilbury area. The town has extensive parkland and open spaces, with Norton Common and Howard Park being two of the largest open spaces in the town, both of which hold the Green Flag Award for well-managed green space.

As the town approached its centenary, there was a campaign to change the name officially from Letchworth to "Letchworth Garden City", this time without the parentheses of the 1904 version of the name. Proponents of the change argued that as the later Welwyn Garden City incorporated the "Garden City" within its official name, so too should the first garden city at Letchworth. The Letchworth campaign was successful, with the name of the railway station being changed in 1999 and the SG6 post town changing from Letchworth to Letchworth Garden City in 2003, the town's centenary year.

== Governance ==
There are two tiers of local government covering Letchworth, at district and county level: North Hertfordshire District Council and Hertfordshire County Council. In addition to these local government bodies, Letchworth is unique in having a private charity, the Letchworth Garden City Heritage Foundation, which is responsible for the management of many aspects of the garden city estate, having some planning and grant-making functions similar to those normally associated with local authorities. These functions derive from the Heritage Foundation's ownership of the estate and do not replace the usual local authority functions and responsibilities, but operate in addition to them.

=== Local government ===
Historically, Letchworth was an ancient parish in the hundred of Broadwater. The parish also had a detached portion at Burleigh Farm, between Langley and Knebworth, some 6 miles (10 km) to the south of the rest of the parish.

The parish of Letchworth was included in the Hitchin Poor Law Union from 1835. It therefore became part of the Hitchin Rural District under the Local Government Act 1894. The 1894 Act also created parish councils, but Letchworth's population was below the threshold to be given one, and so it only had a parish meeting. Following the commencement of work on Letchworth Garden City in 1903, the area purchased for the new town straddled the parishes of Letchworth, Willian and Norton. An unofficial "Residents' Union" or "Residents' Council" for the town was established in June 1905.

==== Letchworth Parish Council (1908–1919) ====
The civil parish of Letchworth was substantially enlarged on 1 April 1908 to take over the area of Norton parish, which was abolished, and the northern part of Willian parish. The detached part of Letchworth parish at Burleigh Farm was transferred to Knebworth at the same time. A parish council was established, with Sir John Gorst, a barrister and former Conservative Member of Parliament, being the first chairman of the parish council.

==== Letchworth Urban District Council (1919–1974) ====
Letchworth
- Urban District
Coat of arms
- Population
  - 1921: 10,302
  - 1971: 29,760
- History
  - Created: 1 April 1919
  - Abolished: 31 March 1974
  - Succeeded by: North Hertfordshire
  - HQ: Letchworth
- Contained within
  - County Council: Hertfordshire

On 1 April 1919, the parish of Letchworth was made an urban district. Letchworth Urban District Council was formed to replace the parish council and also took over district-level responsibilities from the Hitchin Rural District Council. The first urban district council had 15 councillors: nine "all party", four Labour, and two independent. The first chairman was Charles Ball, a Conservative, who had been the chairman of the old parish council since 1916.

In 1935, the council built Letchworth Town Hall on Broadway to act as its meeting place and offices. The building stands in a prominent position overlooking Broadway Gardens in the centre of the town. The urban district was enlarged on 1 April 1935 by the abolition of Willian parish (which had already been reduced in 1908), plus smaller areas from other adjoining parishes.

The council was granted a coat of arms on 11 December 1944. Over the course of its existence, the urban district council built nearly 5,000 homes in the town.

==== North Hertfordshire District Council (1974–present) ====
Letchworth Urban District was abolished by the Local Government Act 1972, with the area merging with the urban districts of Hitchin, Baldock and Royston and the Hitchin Rural District to become the new district of North Hertfordshire on 1 April 1974. With over 30% of the population of the new district, Letchworth was too large to be given a successor parish, and so it became an unparished area, governed directly by North Hertfordshire District Council, with county level services provided by Hertfordshire County Council. North Hertfordshire District Council established its headquarters in Letchworth in 1975 at the newly-built Council Offices on Gernon Road, which had been built as part of the Central Area (later Garden Square) Shopping Centre redevelopment.

==== Letchworth Garden City Council (2005–2013) ====
Letchworth Garden City town council arms

Between 2005 and 2013, the town had a town council. The council was created following a petition organised by a group of people dissatisfied with how the town was being managed by the Heritage Foundation. Opponents felt that the town council itself was an unnecessary layer of administration. Those opposed to the town council won 22 of the 24 seats on the council at the election in 2009 and began the process of abolishing the council, which took over three years, including legal action being taken and public consultation. The parish of Letchworth Garden City and its town council were eventually abolished on 31 March 2013.

Shortly before the 2009 election, the town council had petitioned the College of Arms for a coat of arms, having found they were unable to use the former coat of arms of Letchworth Urban District Council. The college issued the council's new arms in May 2010, by which time the process of abolishing the council was already underway. The design includes the three magnets from Ebenezer Howard's diagram on a green background with a black squirrel.

Since 2013, the town has therefore once again been an unparished area, directly administered by North Hertfordshire District Council, as it had been between 1974 and 2005. The 13 Letchworth councillors on the district council meet as the Letchworth Committee.

=== Management of the Garden City estate ===
The current arrangements have evolved from one of Letchworth Garden City's founding principles, that the profits from the town should be used for the benefit of the residents.

==== First Garden City Limited (1903–1962) ====
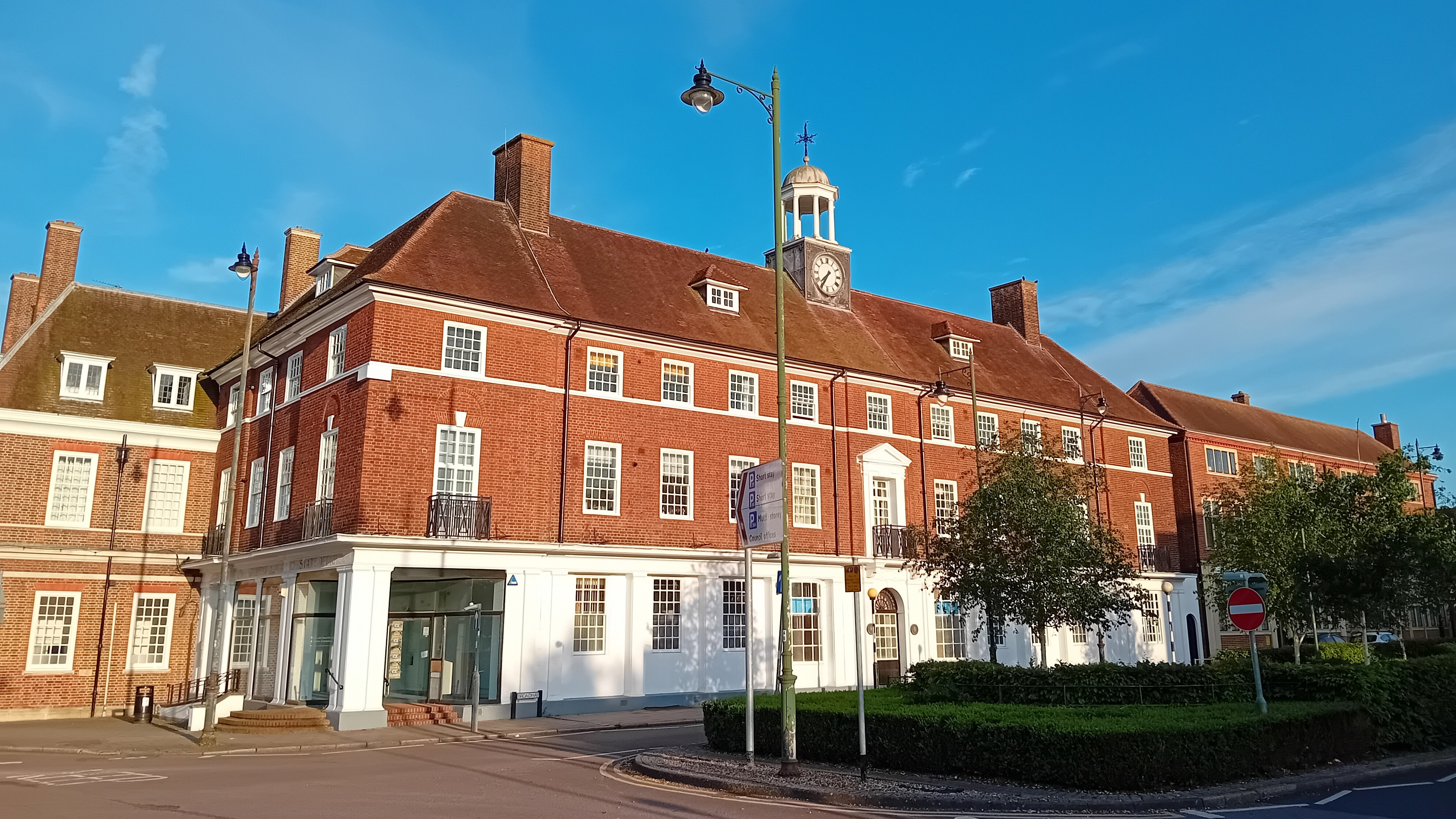
Estate Office, Broadway: First Garden City Limited's offices, built in 1913.

First Garden City Limited was founded in 1903 to purchase the land and develop the town. Once the garden city was substantially complete it was envisaged that the estate would be transferred to a public body which would manage it for the benefit of the community, and until then dividends to shareholders were restricted to no more than 5% per annum. This made it a very unusual company, but it was otherwise an ordinary joint stock company, owned by its shareholders.

Until the Second World War, the company largely ran the emerging town, developing close working relationships with the Hitchin Rural District Council and (after 1919) Letchworth Urban District Council to ensure that any approvals needed were given when the company requested them. The company's layout plan was not underpinned by any statutory town planning role, but was instead a statement of intent from a private landowning company laying out its land as it wished.

The relationship between the company and the council began to change after the Second World War, as more town planning functions were given to councils and utilities nationalised. In 1949, the company changed its articles of association to say that when the company was wound up only 10% of any surplus would be applied for the benefit of the town, rather than the 100% anticipated in 1903. The rest was to be distributed among the shareholders of the company. In 1956, limits on dividends to shareholders were removed, with the company chairman, Eric Macfadyen declaring that "there is no binding obligation to carry out the original policy."

Shares in the company therefore became much more valuable. In 1960, a company called Hotel York Limited acquired a controlling interest in First Garden City Limited. Hotel York's chairman, Amy Rose (née Charles), became managing director of First Garden City Limited in January 1961. Hotel York Limited had been founded in 1906 and had previously owned and run hotels in London, including the Berners Hotel. The Rose family had taken control of Hotel York in 1957, and by 1960 all its properties had been sold. The town feared that such asset stripping might now happen to Letchworth, and the likelihood of the town gaining the financial benefit that Howard and the pioneers had originally envisaged was decreasing. Initial assurances from Mrs Rose about maintaining the integrity of the estate did not last long. During 1961, First Garden City Limited started auctioning freeholds of parts of the estate and the company proposed to the county council that much of the estate's agricultural belt could be developed, allowing the town to grow to 60,000 people rather than the 32,000 which had originally been envisaged.

==== Letchworth Garden City Corporation (1963–1995) ====
Letchworth Garden City Corporation Act 1962
- Act of Parliament
- Parliament of the United Kingdom
- Long title: An Act to constitute the Letchworth Garden City Corporation, to transfer to that Corporation the undertaking of First Garden City Limited, to confer powers upon the Corporation; and for other purposes.
- Citation: 10 & 11 Eliz. 2. c. xxxix

Dates
- Royal assent: 1 August 1962

Status: Current legislation

Text of the Letchworth Garden City Corporation Act 1962 as in force today (including any amendments) within the United Kingdom, from legislation.gov.uk.

In response, the Letchworth Urban District Council began a campaign to restore the original ethos of the garden city to the estate. It enlisted the support of the local Member of Parliament, Martin Maddan, who sponsored a bill in Parliament which, despite much opposition from Hotel York Limited, became the Letchworth Garden City Corporation Act 1962 (10 & 11 Eliz. 2. c. xxxix). The act created a public body, the Letchworth Garden City Corporation, which on 1 January 1963, took over the garden city estate as it had existed on 20 July 1961. Compensation for taking the company's assets had to be paid to First Garden City Limited, which continued to exist as a shell company until it was wound up in 1966. The level of compensation was eventually agreed at £3,115,000. Paying this compensation led to the Letchworth Garden City Corporation operating at a loss for its first few years, funded by loans from the urban district council. The debt was repaid in 1973 and the estate finally started to yield a profit that could be used for the benefit of the town as Howard had originally envisaged.

Having recently taken over the freehold of the garden city estate, the corporation tried unsuccessfully to secure an exemption from the Leasehold Reform Act 1967, which gave long leaseholders of homes the right to acquire the freehold. A "scheme of management" was therefore introduced to allow the corporation to control changes which could be made to properties which had been acquired freehold. Such permissions under the scheme of management operate in addition to any requirement for planning permission from the council. The scheme of management did not apply to the parts of the original garden city estate where the freehold had already been sold, notably including the Grange and Jackmans estates.

==== Letchworth Garden City Heritage Foundation (1995–present) ====
The Letchworth Garden City Heritage Foundation Act 1995 replaced the public sector corporation with the Letchworth Garden City Heritage Foundation (LGCHF), an "industrial and provident society" registered with the Registrar of Friendly Societies with "exempt charity" status.

The Heritage Foundation retains most of the former corporation's functions and responsibilities, and continues to operate the scheme of management for proposed developments on the estate. Although a private body, with a chief executive (Graham Fisher, appointed 2017) and a team of executive directors, the Heritage Foundation also has a degree of democratic accountability with the directors reporting to a board of management, which includes local authority representatives. Six of the thirty governors of the Heritage Foundation are directly elected by residents, and ten governors are nominated to represent various groups in the town. The other fourteen governors are appointed by the board of trustees.

Although many residential properties have been sold since the Leasehold Reform Act 1967, the Heritage Foundation remains the landlord of most of the town's industrial, office and retail premises and the surrounding agricultural belt.

The Letchworth Garden City estate is therefore owned by a charity which is intended to act for the benefit of the town's residents. In 2020, its assets were valued at £193 million. The net income is reinvested for the benefit of the community in accordance with the Heritage Foundation's charitable purposes. Such payments in 2020 totalled £6 million.

== Geography ==
=== Climate ===
Letchworth experiences an oceanic climate (Köppen climate classification Cfb) similar to almost all of the United Kingdom.

Climate data for Climate data from Letchworth
| Month | Jan | Feb | Mar | Apr | May | Jun | Jul | Aug | Sep | Oct | Nov | Dec | Year |
|---|---|---|---|---|---|---|---|---|---|---|---|---|---|
| Mean daily maximum °C (°F) | 6.7 (44.1) | 7.0 (44.6) | 9.9 (49.8) | 12.7 (54.9) | 16.1 (61.0) | 19.2 (66.6) | 21.8 (71.2) | 21.6 (70.9) | 18.3 (64.9) | 14.1 (57.4) | 9.7 (49.5) | 6.9 (44.4) | 13.7 (56.7) |
| Mean daily minimum °C (°F) | 1.2 (34.2) | 1.0 (33.8) | 2.7 (36.9) | 4.0 (39.2) | 6.9 (44.4) | 9.8 (49.6) | 11.9 (53.4) | 11.8 (53.2) | 9.9 (49.8) | 7.1 (44.8) | 3.8 (38.8) | 1.6 (34.9) | 6.0 (42.8) |
| Average precipitation mm (inches) | 67.0 (2.64) | 47.7 (1.88) | 49.1 (1.93) | 54.1 (2.13) | 52.0 (2.05) | 52.7 (2.07) | 48.8 (1.92) | 62.5 (2.46) | 57.2 (2.25) | 81.1 (3.19) | 75.0 (2.95) | 65.1 (2.56) | 712.3 (28.04) |
| Average precipitation days | 12.1 | 9.4 | 10.2 | 10.2 | 8.8 | 8.6 | 8.0 | 8.8 | 8.9 | 11.0 | 11.6 | 11.0 | 118.5 |
| Mean monthly sunshine hours | 60.6 | 77.3 | 111.7 | 159.9 | 193.9 | 199.1 | 207.1 | 199.1 | 143.7 | 113.2 | 69.1 | 50.6 | 1,585.3 |

Letchworth was struck by an F1/T2 tornado on 23 November 1981, as part of the record-breaking nationwide tornado outbreak on that day.

=== Wildlife ===
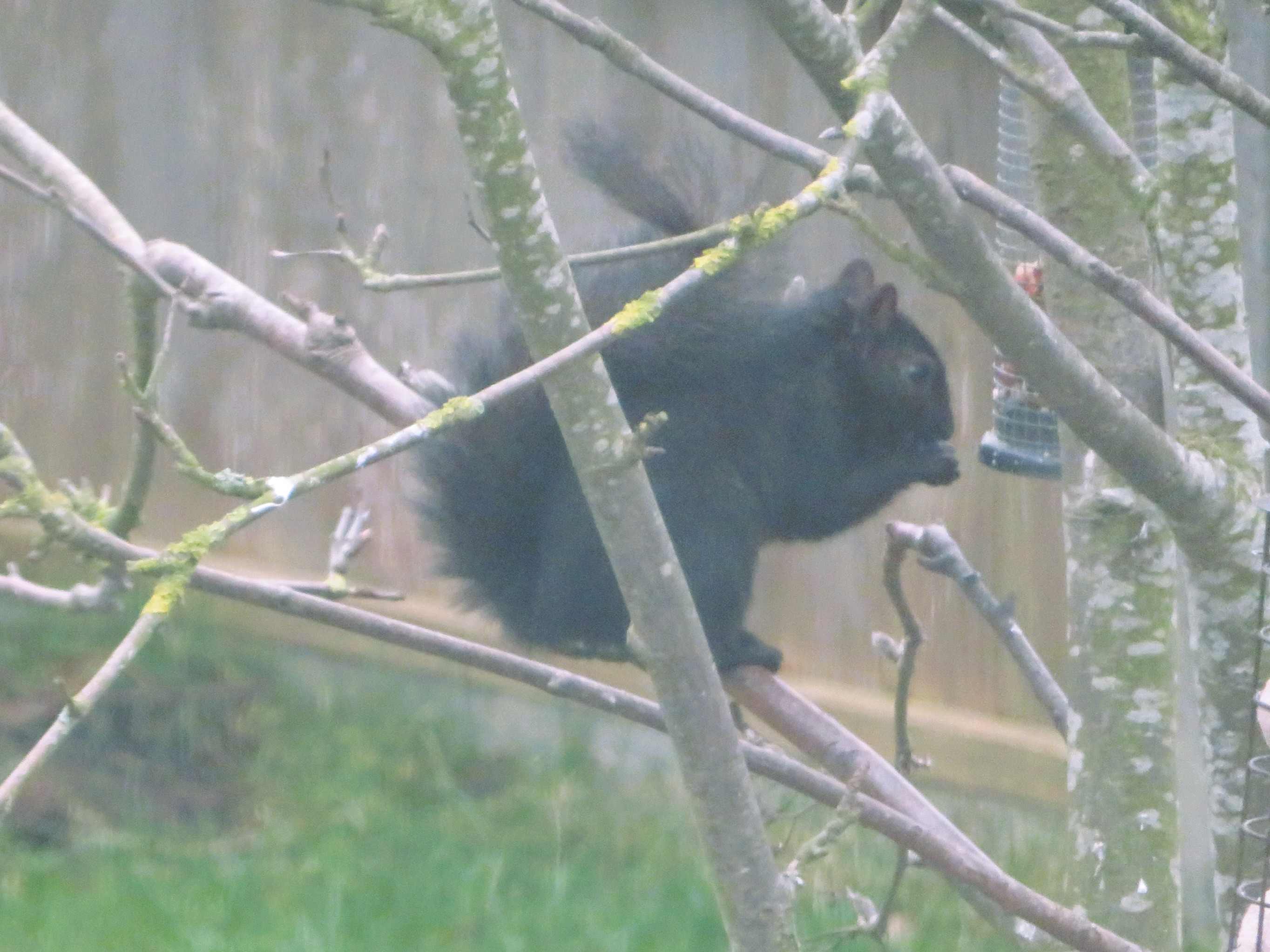
Black squirrel in a garden in Letchworth

Letchworth Garden City is home to one of the UK's largest colonies of black squirrels, which were first recorded in Letchworth in 1912. The origin of the colony is unclear, but a 2014 study at Anglia Ruskin University concluded that the squirrels are a variation of the common North American grey squirrel with a faulty pigment gene. The black squirrel is now a relatively common sight across Letchworth and the surrounding area.

There are also muntjac deer in the town, living principally on Norton Common, but also seen elsewhere.

== Sport and leisure ==
Sport has played an important part in the town's history, with open spaces and playing fields being incorporated into the town's layout. Many early businesses in the town provided recreation facilities for their workers, in keeping with the ethos of the garden city movement. The town has numerous sports clubs, which are generally amateur in nature. Many of the clubs compete in regional and national leagues. The more prominent sports represented in the town include:

- Cricket - Letchworth Garden City Cricket Club was established in 1905 and since 1996 has been based at Letchworth Corner Sports Club on Whitethorn Lane. The club has five men's teams, which all compete in leagues, and several junior teams.
- Football - The town's football club is Letchworth Garden City Eagles, based at Pixmore Pitches on Baldock Road. Letchworth's previous semi-professional club, Letchworth Football Club (the "Bluebirds"), went out of business in 2002. The Hertfordshire Football Association is based at the former Letchworth Football Club ground (also on Baldock Road), now called the County Ground and used to host various county-wide and other competitions.
- Golf - Letchworth Golf Club was founded in 1905 with a nine-hole course in the grounds of Letchworth Hall. The course was extended in 1910 to become a 6,000-yard (5,500 m) eighteen-hole course, designed by Harry Vardon. It was extended to become a 6,459-yard (5,906 m) par-71 course in 2003. Another golf facility in the town is the Letchworth Par 3 Golf Centre at Willian Way, which has a nine-hole course.
- Hockey - Letchworth Hockey Club was founded in 1960 and is based at Letchworth Corner Sports Club. It competes in the East Region Hockey Leagues.
- Roller hockey - Letchworth Rink Hockey Club is based at North Herts Leisure Centre. The senior team were the National Rink Hockey Association's division 1 national champions in 2009.
- Rugby - Letchworth Rugby Club was founded in 1924 and is based at Baldock Road.
- Running - North Herts Road Runners was founded 1986. It hosts running events including the Standalone 10K, the Greenway Challenge, the First Saturday of the Month 5K, Santa Canta and Run Round the Garden. It was awarded the prize of England Athletics Club of the Year in the Eastern Region in 2019. Members regularly participate in Letchworth parkrun, held each Saturday at the Grange recreation ground.
- Swimming - Letchworth's first outdoor swimming pool opened in 1908 in Howard Park and was rather basic, being filled from the waters of Pix Brook. It was replaced by a lido on Norton Common in 1935, now called Letchworth Outdoor Pool. As well as a 55-yard (50 m), eight lane main pool with a large trainer pool alongside, the facility includes an extensive sun bathing area, and parking facilities. A public indoor swimming pool opened at the North Herts Leisure Centre on Baldock Road in 1982. Various clubs use the two public pools, including Letchworth Amateur Swimming Club, founded in 1934.
- Tennis - Letchworth Sports and Tennis Club is based at Muddy Lane and has facilities for indoor and outdoor tennis, squash, gym and croquet.

=== Recreation routes ===
The Heritage Foundation marked the town's centenary in 2003 by building a landscaped path for walkers and cyclists. The path, known as the Greenway, forms a 13.6-mile (21.9 km) loop around the town. The Icknield Way Path, a multi-user route for walkers, horse riders and off-road cyclists, passes through the town on its 110-mile (180 km) journey from Ivinghoe Beacon in Buckinghamshire to Knettishall Heath in Suffolk.

=== Art gallery ===
Broadway Gallery is a not-for-profit art gallery owned and managed by the Letchworth Garden City Heritage Foundation. Situated in the former Letchworth Art Centre, the Gallery opened to the public in 2016 with an exhibition of painter and prinkmaker Richard Smith (artist), who was born and grew up in Letchworth.

=== Cinema ===
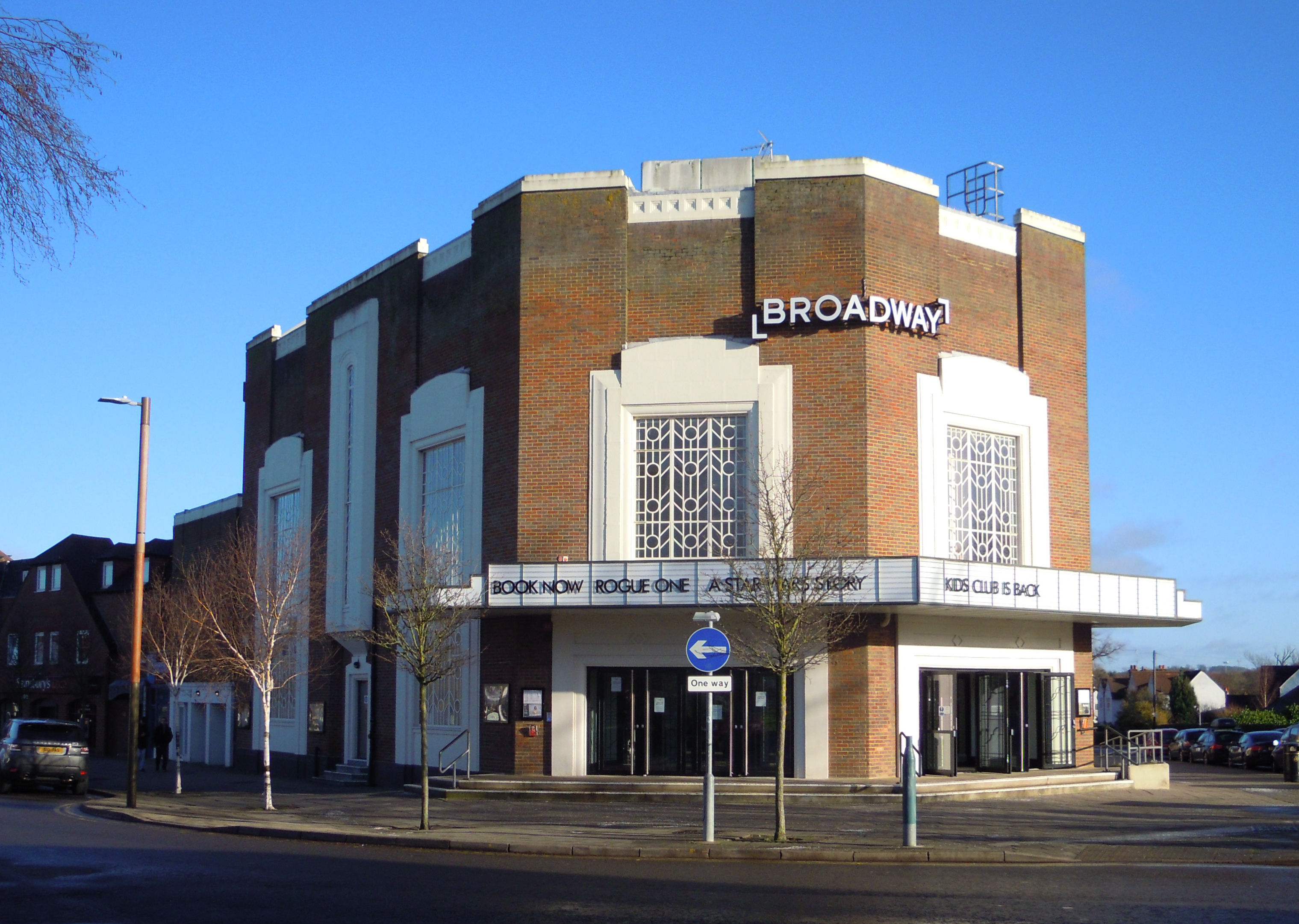
The Broadway Cinema in 2017

Letchworth had one of the first purpose-built cinemas in the country, the Picture Palace (later the Palace Cinema) on Eastcheap, which opened in 1909 and closed in 1977. The town's remaining cinema is the Art Deco-style Broadway Cinema at the corner of Eastcheap and Gernon Road, which opened on 26 August 1936 with a black tie gala screening of Follow the Fleet starring Fred Astaire and Ginger Rogers. From the 1990s, the Heritage Foundation ran the cinema in partnership with its owners, before taking full control in 2008. The building was extended in 2016 to allow the main screen to be used as a both a cinema and theatre.

== Local media ==
Local news and television programmes is provided by BBC East and ITV Anglia. Television signals are received from the Sandy Heath TV transmitter. The town's local radio stations are BBC Three Counties Radio on 95.5 FM and Heart Hertfordshire (originally BOB FM) on 106.9 FM. The local newspapers are The Comet and Hertfordshire Mercury.

== Town twinning ==
Letchworth is twinned with:

- Chagny, France (twinned 1978).
- Wissen, Rhineland-Palatinate, Germany (twinned 1983).
- Kristiansand, Norway (twinned in the 1960s).

== Schools ==
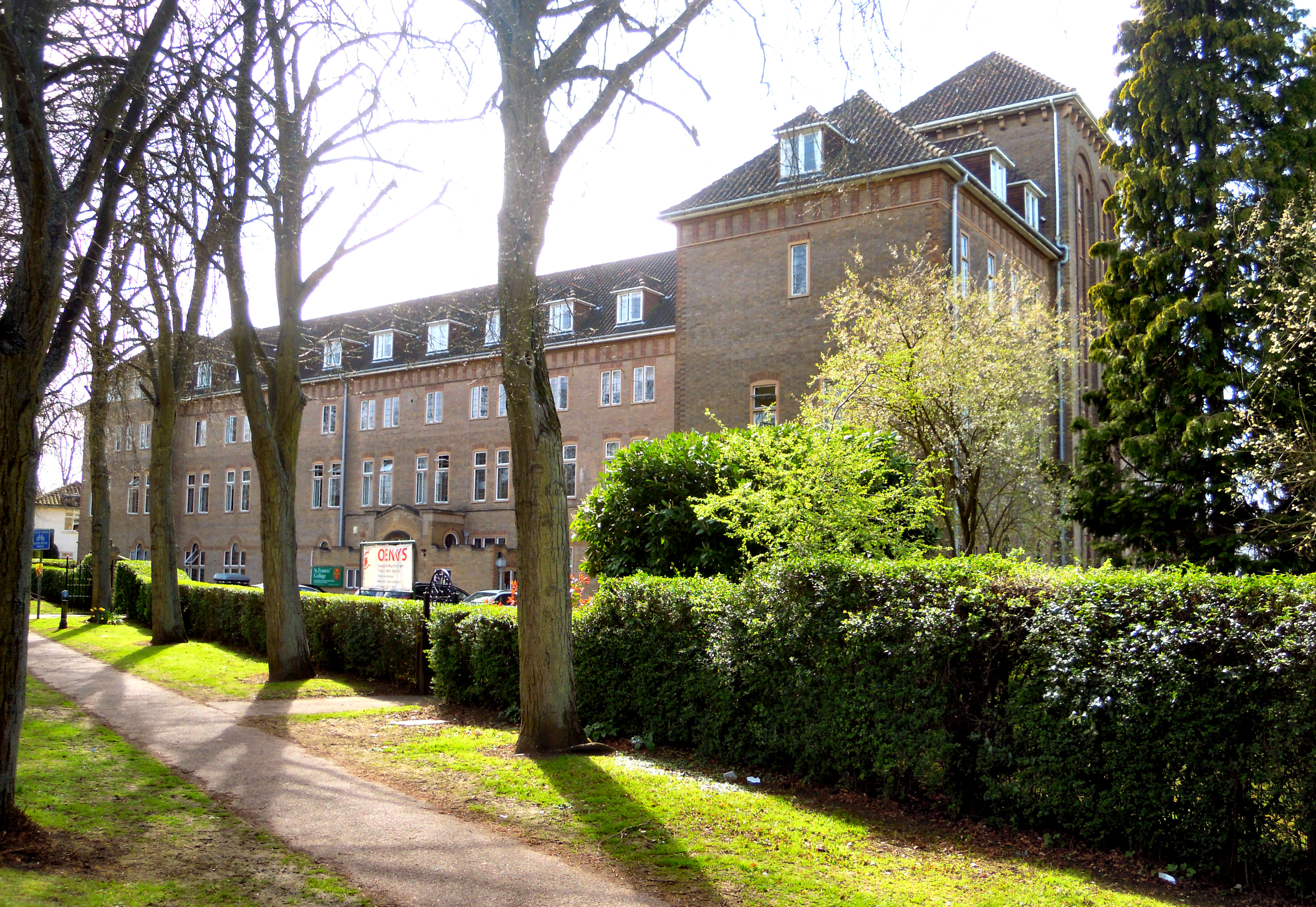
St Francis' College from Broadway in 2017

Letchworth has a mixture of independent and state schools. There are two state secondary schools:

- The Highfield School
- Fearnhill School

When work began on the garden city, there were pre-existing church schools in the villages of Willian and Norton. A "Garden City School" opened in November 1905 in temporary sheds near the railway. It transferred to a new building on Norton Road in 1909, becoming Norton School. Pixmore School opened in 1913 on School Walk, followed by Westbury School on West View in 1925. These were elementary schools, catering for children from ages five to fourteen, which was the school leaving age at the time. Letchworth Grammar School opened in 1931 in prominent buildings in the town centre, with the name carved in the stonework over its doors.

The school leaving age was raised to fifteen under the Education Act 1944 and schools were gradually separated into primary and secondary schools. The secondary part of Pixmore School relocated to new premises on the Jackmans estate in March 1962, becoming the Willian School. The junior part of Pixmore School kept the name, but later moved from School Walk to Rushby Mead. The Highfield School opened in September 1965.

With the move to comprehensive schools, Letchworth Grammar School changed its name to Fearnhill School in 1973 and moved to its current site on Icknield Way in 1976. Willian School closed in 1991. Norton School closed in 2002. The Highfield School was rebuilt in 2016.

The independent schools in Letchworth include the St Christopher School and St Francis' College. The St Christopher School was founded in 1915 as "Arundale" by the Theosophical Educational Trust, which took over the vacated buildings of the short-lived independent Letchworth School on Barrington Road, built in 1909. A new school building was built at the junction of Spring Road and Broadway in 1919, when the school assumed its current name, with the Barrington Road building then being used as accommodation for boarders. There is a cornerstone on the Broadway building laid by Annie Besant. The school consolidated onto the Barrington Road site in 1928. It is noted for its distinctive vegetarian and Quaker ethos.

The site vacated by the St Christopher School on Broadway became St Francis' College, a girls' school, in 1934. Both independent schools admit boarders and day-pupils.

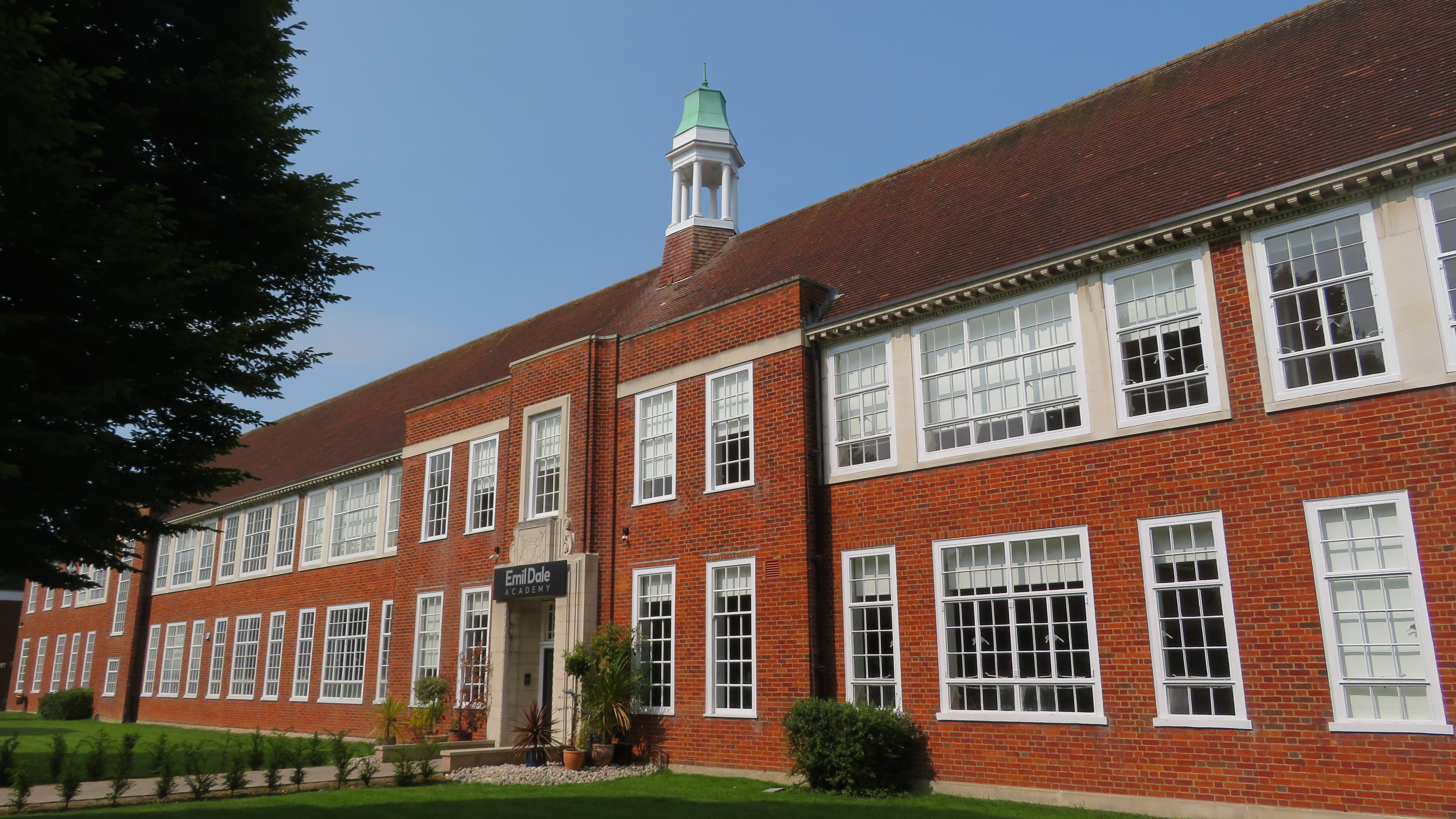
Emil Dale Academy, Broadway, in building originally built as Letchworth Grammar School

In 2024, Emil Dale Academy, a musical theatre school affiliated with the University of Bedfordshire, moved from Hitchin to the Old Grammar School building on Broadway.

== Notable residents ==
- John Allison – comic writer
- Adrian Fortescue (1874–1923) – Roman Catholic priest and scholar who founded the Church of St Hugh of Lincoln in the town
- Walter Henry Gaunt (1874–1951) – English transport engineer
- Harold Gilman (1876–1919) – artist, founder member of the Camden Town Group
- Spencer Gore (1878–1914) – artist, first president of the Camden Town Group, lived in Gilman's house (100 Wilbury Road) after Gilman had left it, painting it as "Harold Gilman's House at Letchworth"
- W. F. Harvey (1885–1937) – horror writer, lived in the town from 1935 until his death
- Annie Kenney (1879–1953) – suffragette, lived in Letchworth for some years before her death in 1953
- Tom Killick (1907–1953) – international cricketer, and rector of Willian
- James Lovelock (1919–2022) – scientist, author of the Gaia Theory, born in Letchworth
- Frank Newman Turner (1913–1964) – a pioneer in organic horticulture who moved to Letchworth in 1958 and set up a practice in osteopathy, naturopathy and medical herbalism
- Laurence Olivier (1907–1989) – actor; Olivier's father was Rector of Letchworth Parish 1918–1924.
- Philip Purser (1925–2022) - television critic and novelist.
- William Ratcliffe (1870–1955) – artist and member of the Camden Town Group
- Hans Redlich (1903–1968), musicologist, founded the Letchworth Choral Society in 1941
- Richard Smith (1931–2016) - English artist
- Frederick Tees (1922–1982) – sergeant in the original "Dambusters" 617 Squadron, who was the sole survivor from his bomber; lived in Letchworth after the war.
- Peter Underwood (1923–2014) – parapsychologist and author, born in Letchworth
- Simon West – film director, directed the film Con Air
- Josephine Wiggs – bass guitar player of The Breeders

== Letchworth in popular culture ==
The author George Orwell lived in the nearby village of Wallington in the 1930s. In his polemic essay on wartime Britain, "The Lion and the Unicorn", he said "The place to look for the gems of the future England is in light-industry areas and along the arterial roads. In Slough, Dagenham, Barnet, Letchworth, Hayes – everywhere, indeed, on the outskirts of great towns – the old pattern is gradually changing into something new." In The Road to Wigan Pier, chapter 11, he described "two dreadful-looking old men", supposedly socialists, getting on a bus in Letchworth.

The 2013 film, The World's End, directed by Edgar Wright and starring Simon Pegg and Nick Frost, was filmed in both Letchworth and Welwyn Garden City. The film is structured around a pub crawl, and several premises in Letchworth were used to portray the pubs in the film, including shops and the Broadway Cinema (which appeared as "The Mermaid") as well as the small number of actual pubs in town.

Letchworth features prominently in Richard Osman's mystery novel We Solve Murders.

== See also ==
- Broadway, Letchworth
- The Cloisters Letchworth
- St George's Church
- Church of St Paul, Letchworth
- Letchworth Cemetery

== Bibliography ==
- Briggs, Geoffrey (1971). Civic and Corporate Heraldry. London: Heraldry Today ISBN 0900455217
- Gordon, D. I. (1977). A Regional History of the Railways of Great Britain: Volume V: The Eastern Counties. Newton Abbot: David & Charles. ISBN 0-7153-7431-1
- Hall, Peter (1996). Cities of Tomorrow (2nd ed.). Oxford: Blackwell. ISBN 0-631-19943-8
- Harrison, Roger; Walker, David (2006). David's Book of Letchworth. Letchworth: David's Bookshops. ISBN 0-9554333-0-4
- Howard, Ebenezer (1898). To-morrow: A Peaceful Path to Real Reform. London: Swan Sonnenschein.
- Johnson, Kenneth (1976). The Book of Letchworth. Chesham: Barracuda Books. ISBN 0-86023-016-3
- Miller, Mervyn (2002). Letchworth: The First Garden City (2nd ed.). Chichester: Phillimore. ISBN 1-86077-213-7
- Plinston, Horace (1981). A Tale of One City. Letchworth: Letchworth Garden City Corporation.
- Purdom, Charles Benjamin (1963). The Letchworth Achievement. London: J.M. Dent & Sons.
- Ward, Stephen V. (2016). The Peaceful Path. Hatfield: Hertfordshire Press. ISBN 978-1-909291-69-0
