= Walter Henry Gaunt =

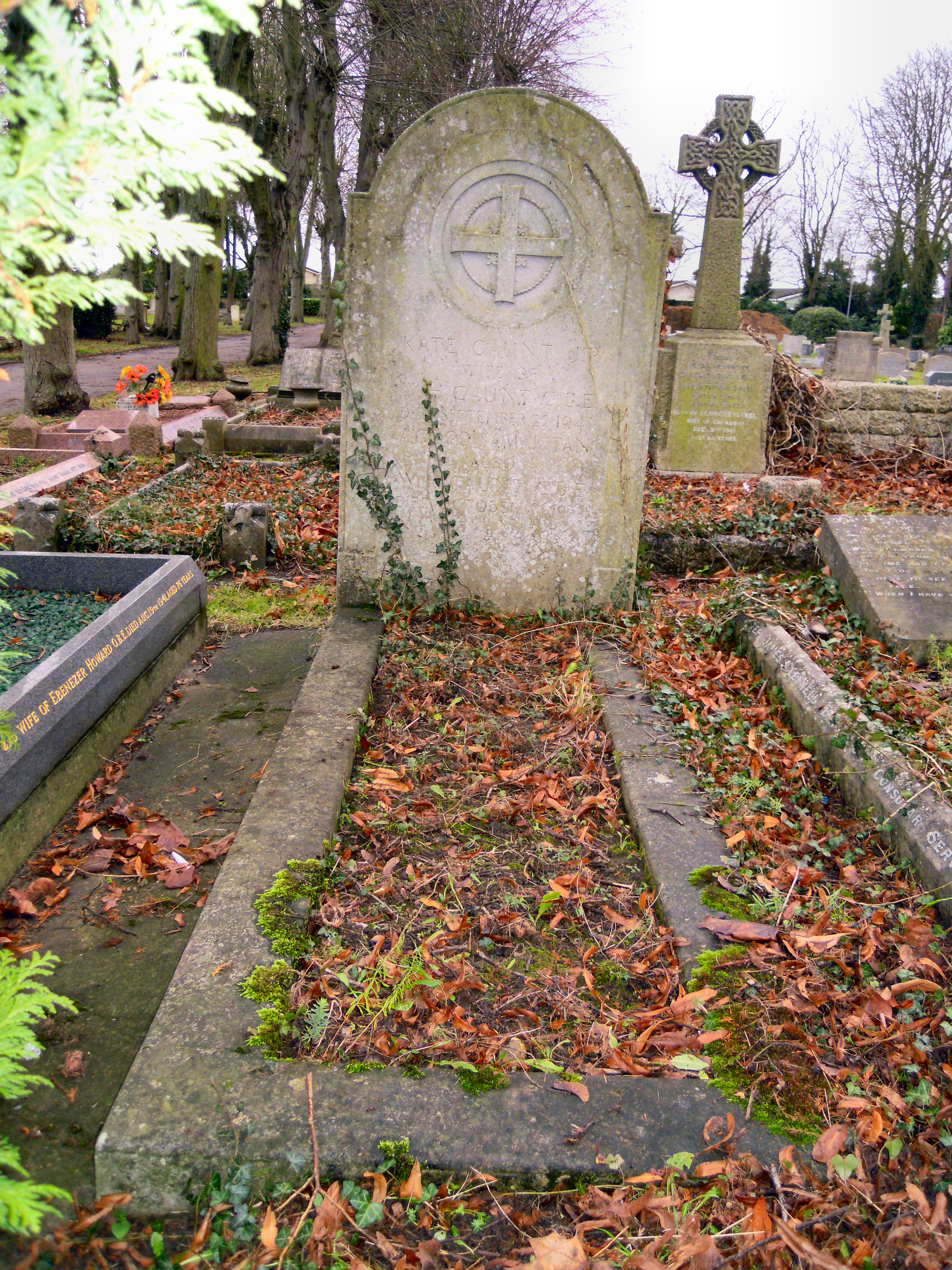
Grave of W. H. Gaunt in Letchworth Cemetery in 2017

Walter Henry Gaunt (born in Bradford, Yorkshire, 13 January 1874 – 31 October 1951) was an English transport engineer who began his working life developing and building gas-powered trams. He was educated at Manchester Grammar School before joining the Ashbury Company in Manchester as an apprentice. The works at Ashbury supplied the trams for Britain's first gas-powered tramway, the Blackpool, St Annes and Lytham tramway, operated by the British Gas Traction Company. Gaunt transferred to the tramway company in 1896, and then became manager of a similar gas-powered scheme at Trafford Park in 1896. Following the financial collapse of the Gas Traction Company in 1898 Gaunt was appointed manager of Trafford Park's gas and electric tramways, a position he held until 1905, when the operation of the electric line was taken over by the corporations of Manchester and Salford.

Gaunt then moved south to manage the world's first garden city, at Letchworth. During the First World War he worked for the Coal Mines Department of the Board of Trade as a distribution superintendent in charge of coal, gas, and electricity. He subsequently joined J. Lyons & Co. as a transport manager, and eventually rose to become a director of the company. In 1940 Gaunt became transport adviser to the Ministry of Food.

Gaunt married Kate (née Brooks Kearsley) in 1900. The couple had no children, and she died in 1941. He was a member of the Institution of Mechanical Engineers and a vice-president of the Institute of Transport. He was awarded a C.B.E. in 1938.

Gaunt is buried in Letchworth Cemetery.
