= Pix Brook =

Stream in Hertfordshire and Bedfordshire, England

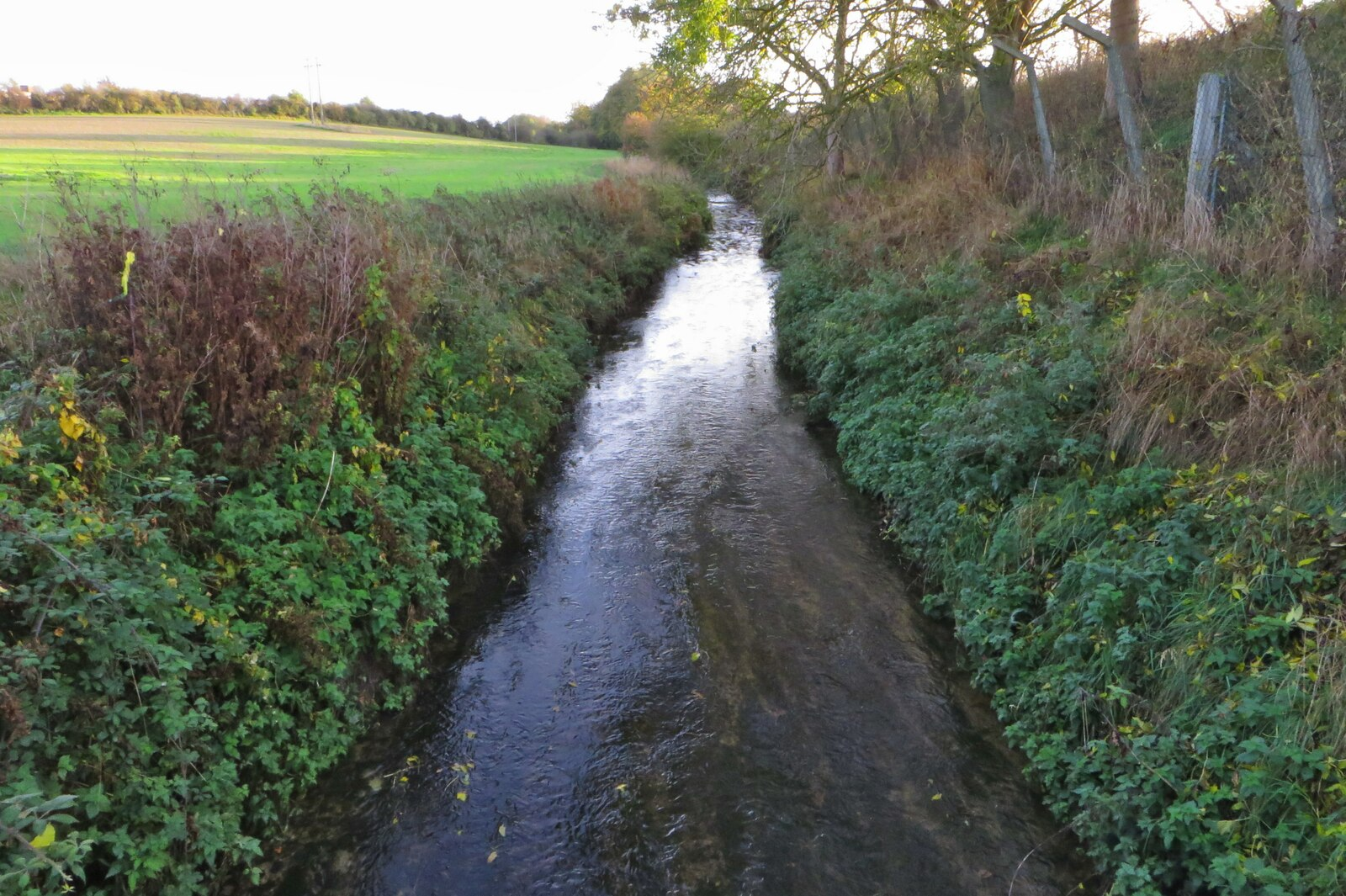

Location
- Country: England
- Counties: Hertfordshire, Bedfordshire
- Course: Letchworth, Stotfold,Arlesey.

Physical characteristics
- Source
  - location: Norton Common, Letchworth.
  - coordinates: 51°59′05.44″N 0°13′44.38″W
- Mouth: River Ivel
  - location: Arlesey, Bedfordshire
  - coordinates: 52°01′53″N 0°15′52″W
  - elevation: 35 m (115 ft)
- Length: 7.931 km (4.928 miles)

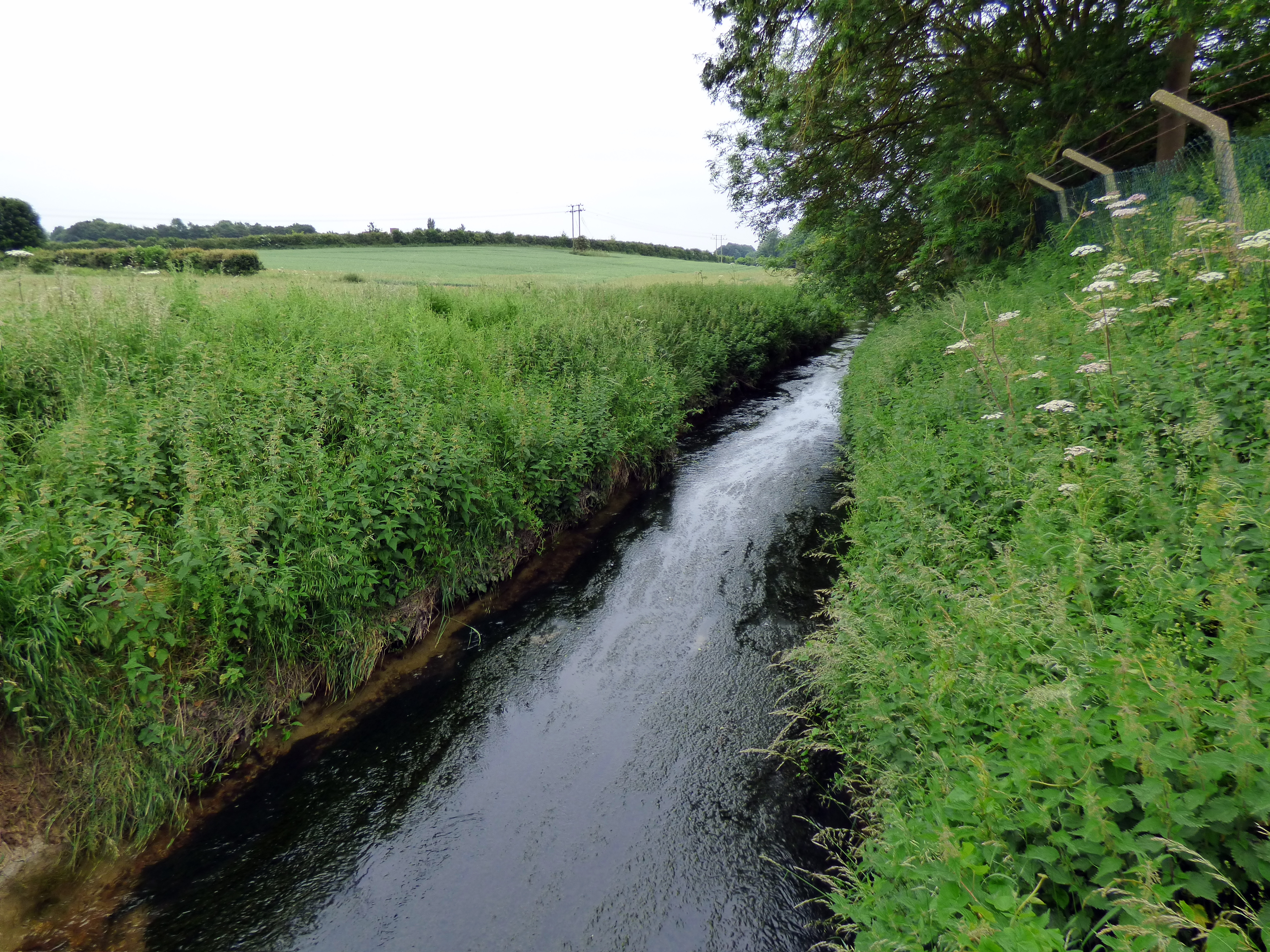
Pix Brook near Fairfield

Pix Brook is a chalk stream in England that flows in a northerly and westerly direction through Letchworth Garden City in Hertfordshire and Stotfold in Bedfordshire to the River Ivel north of Arlesey. It is both urban and rural in character and has a length of 7.931 kilometres (4.928 miles).

== Hydrology ==
Pix Brook is 7.931 kilometres (4.9 miles) in length. When measured in 2022, the brook had a moderate ecological status. Its hydromorphological designation is 'heavily modified', meaning it fails to achieve good ecological status owing to significant man-made alterations to its natural physical character. Environment Agency data gives the Pix Brook a catchment area of 15.505 square kilometres (6.0 sq mi). It is one of twenty water bodies making up the Ivel Operational Catchment.

== Course ==
Pix Brook, approximately 7.931 km (4.928 mi) long and draining a catchment area of about 15.505 km^{2} (5.987 sq mi), rises from springs at Norton Common in Letchworth Garden City and flows through Letchworth and Arlesey before joining the River Ivel at Stotfold.

== Water management ==
The Letchworth Sewage Treatment Works operated by Anglian Water discharges treated waste water into Pix Brook.

== River Modification ==
In Letchworth, the brook is culverted through Howard Park, and the roadway of Rushby Mead bordering the eastern edge of the park follows the curves of the brook.

== Geology ==
A study published in the mid-1990s described Pix Brook as a shallow stream over a bed of coarse-grained calcareous gravel and sand, noting its 'relatively steep' gradient fall of 2.8 metres (9.2 ft) per km in comparison to the less than 1 metre (3.3 ft) per km fall of the River Ivel. At Norton Common local nature reserve, mineral-rich springs supply the brook.

== School relocation ==
A school named Pix Brook Academy was initially based at Etonbury Academy from 2019 but a year later moved to newly constructed facilities in Stotfold.

== Incidents ==
Pix Brook flooded on 4 July 2015 with five properties in Stotfold affected. A formal investigation by Central Bedfordshire Council determined the flooding was likely caused by torrential rain over stretching the drainage system, compounded by wood and watercress debris clogging up a culvert trash screen installed earlier that year by The Bedfordshire and River Ivel Internal Drainage Board.
