= St Hugh's Church =

St Hugh's Church may refer to:

- Church of St Hugh, Charterhouse, Somerset, England
- Church of St Hugh, Durleigh, Somerset, England
- Church of St Hugh of Lincoln, Letchworth, England
- St Hugh's Church, Foolow, Derbyshire, England
- St Hugh's Church, Lincoln, Lincolnshire, England
- St Hugh's Church, Sturton by Stow, Lincolnshire

== See also ==
- Saint Hugh (disambiguation)
- St Hugh's (disambiguation)
