= Brahmavar Orthodox Diocese =

Diocese of the Malankara Orthodox Syrian Church

Diocese of Brahmavar

Orthodox
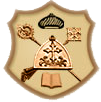
- Catholicate Emblem

Location
- Country: India
- Territory: Karnataka, Goa
- Metropolitan: H. G. Yakob Mar Elias
- Headquarters: Mount Horeb Bishop's House, Balikashram Road, Kankanady, Mangalore - 575 002

Information
- First holder: Yakob Mar Elias
- Rite: Malankara Rite
- Established: 2010
- Diocese: Brahmavar Diocese
- Parent church: Malankara Orthodox Syrian Church

Website
- Brahmavar Diocese

The Brahmavar Diocese is one among the 32 dioceses of the Malankara Orthodox Syrian Church. The diocese was created in August 2010 by H. H. Baselios Marthoma Didymos I. H. G. Yakob Mar Elias is the current Metropolitan of the diocese. The head office is located in Mount Horeb Bishop's House, Nanthoor, Mangalore, Karnataka.

== History ==
The diocese was created in August 2010 by H. H. Baselios Marthoma Didymos I by Kalpana no 389/2010. It was a counsel of Malankara Association's Managing committee held on 3 August 2010 and recommended by Holy Episcopal Synod in same date. H. G. Yakob Mar Elias became the first Metropolitan of newly formed diocese with its headquarters at Mangalore.

== Features ==
The key feature of this diocese is the Konkani Orthodox Community and their clergy. It is the first non Keralite community in the Malankara Orthodox Church under the mission of St. Alvares Mar Julius Metropolitan of Ceylon-Goa and Rev Fr. Roque Zephrin Noronah. The diocese has parishes in Kannur (Cannanore) and Kasaragod districts of Kerala, Dakshina Kannada and Udupi (South Canara), Chickmangalore and Coorg districts in the state of Karnataka, state of Goa and in Abu Dhabi, UAE. The major languages used in the liturgy are Malayalam, Konkani, Tulu, English and Hindi.

== Now ==
=== Parishes ===
Currently, there are 36 parishes in diocese. 16 churches in Kerala,17 churches in Karnataka, 2 in Goa, 1 in UAE. 11 parishes have more than 50 families. There are 2800 families in this diocese. The tomb of Metropolitan St. Alvares Mar Julius is situated in St. Mary Orthodox Church, Panaji. St. George Orthodox Church, Ichilampady (Georgian Pilgrim Centre), St. Mary Orthodox Cathedral, Brahmavar and St. George Orthodox Cathedral, Abu Dhabi are some of the major parishes in the diocese. There are 9 chapels under which six belong to the Konkani community and the rest belong to the Malayali communities. There are also active Konkani congregations in Mandya, Bangalore, Mumbai, Kuwait and the U.A.E. There are students ministry in the diocese.

=== Priests ===
There are 29 priests with one Cor-Episcopa and Ramban in this diocese. Teaching ministry is also a feature in this diocese.

== Parish List ==
- Abu Dhabi St.George Cathedral
- Arangu St. George
- Ariprod St.Thomas
- Aravanchal St. George
- Birikkulam St.Gregorios
- Brahmavar St. Mary's Cathedral
- Eattukudakka St.Mary’s
- Hegla Mar Gregorios
- Ichilampady St.George
- Kadumeni St.George
- Kalanja St. Marys
- Karayathumchal St.Mary’s
- Karuvamkayam Mar Gregorios
- Karugunda St. George
- Mangalore St. Gregorios
- Nelliadi St. Gregorios
- Padangady St. Mary's
- Pathavu St. George
- Renjilady St. Thomas
- Kasargode St.Mary’s
- Kozhichal St.Mary’s
- Mardalam St.Mary’s
- Narasiharajapuram St.Mary’s
- Narkilakadu St.Mary’s
- Pakkanjikadu St.George
- Panaji St.Mary’s
- Payyavor St. Gregorios
- Sampiadi St.Mary’s
- Siddhapura St.Mary’s
- Thannir Panthal St.George
- Vanchiyam St.George
- Vasco-Da-Gama St.Mary’s
- Chuzhali St. George
- Manipal St. Thomas
- Ganganadu St. Gregorios
- Shivmogga St. George

Chapels

- Ammunje St. Antony
- Sasthan St. Thomas
- Kandloor St. Mary's
- Koorady St. Peter and St. Paul
- Hulikal St. Gregorios
- Hosangady St. George
- Mangodu St. George
- N.R Pura St. Gregorios

== See also ==
- Brahmavar (Konkani) Orthodox Church
- Metropolitan Alvares Mar Julius
- Saint Thomas
- Baselios Mar Thoma Paulose II
