= Avalon, France =

Coordinates: 45°25′46″N 6°1′53″E

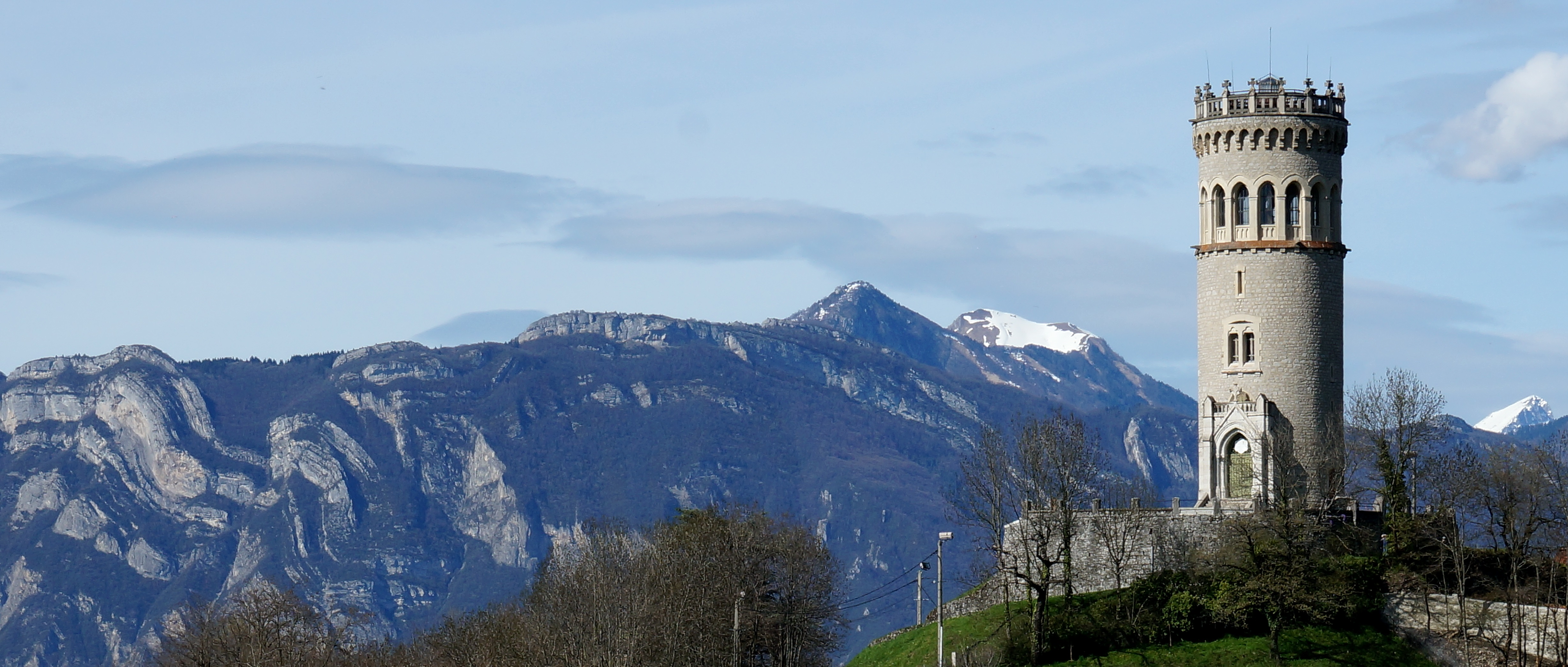
Tour d'Avalon

Avalon (French pronunciation: [avalɔ̃]) is a village outside Pontcharra, Isère département, eastern France. It is part of the commune Saint-Maximin. It is notable for being the birthplace of Saint Hugh of Lincoln (1130s), and for the Tour d'Avalon, a tower in the village.
