= St Hugh's Church, Sturton by Stow =

Church in Sturton by Stow, Lincolnshire, England

St Hugh's Church
- Church of St Hugh of Avalon, Sturton by Stow
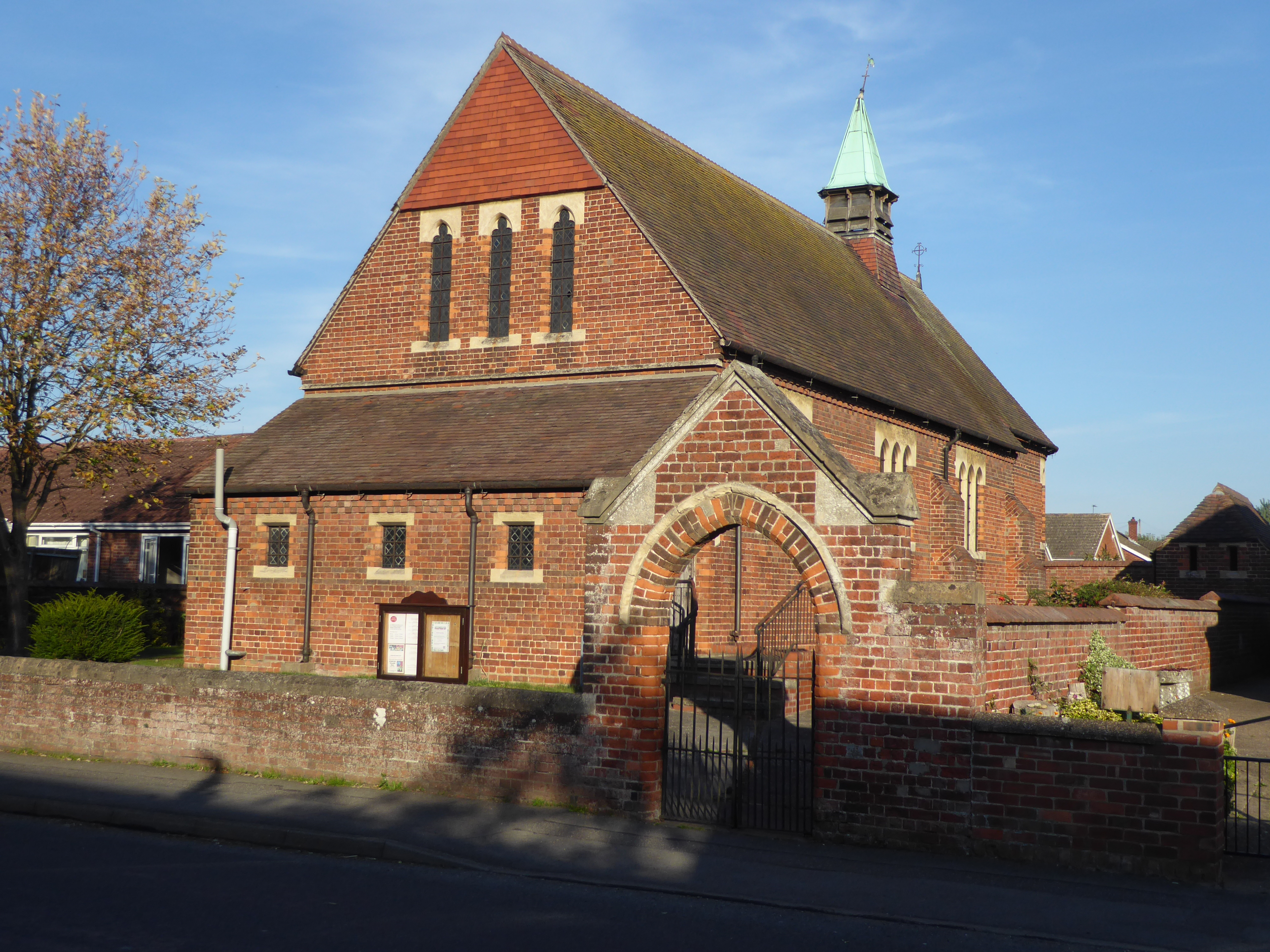
- St Hugh's Church, Sturton by Stow
- St Hugh's Church
- 53.313595°N 0.665285°W
- OS grid reference: SK 89020 80461
- Location: Sturton by Stow, West Lindsey,
- Country: England
- Previous denomination: Church of England

History
- Status: Former parish church
- Dedication: Hugh of Lincoln
- Dedicated: 1879
- Consecrated: 1879

Architecture
- Functional status: Redundant
- Heritage designation: Grade II
- Designated: December 1964
- Architect: John Loughborough Pearson
- Completed: 1879
- Closed: 2022

St Hugh's Church is a redundant church in the village of Sturton by Stow in Lincolnshire, England. It is dedicated to Hugh of Avalon, also known as Hugh of Lincoln. It was built in 1879 for the residents of the village as a mission church of Stow Minster in Stow, and this remained the status of the church until its closure in 2022. The church has since been sold and is in private ownership. The nearest church is now Stow Minster.

The church was built in red brick. The architect was John Loughborough Pearson. It has tiled roofs and a small bell turret. It is grade II listed.

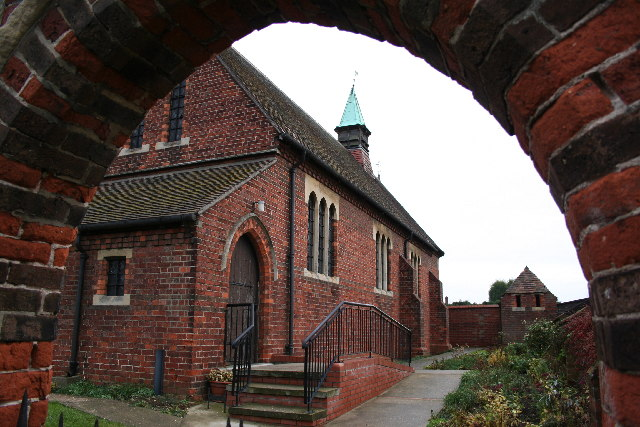
The church in 2005

The church was in use between 1879 and closed at some point in the late 2010s-early 2020s. The church was sold in 2022. Its interior remains largely unaltered aside from the removal of ecclesiastical fittings.
