= St Hugh's =

St Hugh's may refer to:

- St Hugh's Church (disambiguation), several uses
- St Hugh's College, Oxford, a college of the University of Oxford, England
- St Hugh's College, Tollerton, a former Roman Catholic seminary, England
- St Hugh's High School, Saint Andrew, Jamaica
- St Hugh's Preparatory School, Kingston, Jamaica
- St Hugh's School, Faringdon, Oxfordshire, England
- St Hugh's School, Woodhall Spa, Lincolnshire, England

== See also ==
- Saint Hugh (disambiguation), the name of several saints
- St. Hilda's & St. Hugh's School, New York
