= Konkani Orthodox Church =

Church in Udipi, India

The Konkani Orthodox Church is a split faction from the Catholic Church in India, founded by Bishop Antonio Francisco Xavier Alvares in 1889. Its main cathedral is situated at Brahmavar, in Udipi, Karnataka, India.

Earlier, as a presbyter, Alvares was excommunicated from the Catholic Church, stripped naked & paraded through the streets. He left the church with some hundreds of Catholic Christian families in what was Portuguese Goa; to join the Malankara Orthodox Syrian Church in British India. Eventually, after Alvares died, this Brahmavar (Konkani) community had come into existence since then as a part of the Indian Orthodox Church. The church uses the Tridentine Mass, in Konkani, although, in recent years, part of the liturgy has been West Syrianised, with use of the West Syriac Rite 3 times out of 4 in a month when it comes to Sundays.

Antonio Francisco Xavier Alvares was ordained as the first Orthodox Metropolitan of Goa, Bombay, Ceylon and Greater India in 1889 AD. by Paulose Mar Athanasius and Geevarghese Mar Gregorios of Parumala at the Orthodox Theological Seminary, Kottayam in the state of Kerala (Malabar region).

Presently, they are under the Brahmavar diocese of the Malankara (Indian) Orthodox Church.
