= Yakob Elias =

Oriental Orthodox bishop

H.G. Yakob Mar Elias
- Church: Malankara Orthodox Syrian Church
- Diocese: Brahmavar Diocese
- Appointed: 4 August 2010
- In office: 2010–present

Orders
- Consecration: 12 May 2010

Personal details
- Born: 24 February 1953 (age 72)
- Parents: Chackaleth Viruthiyath Kizhakkethil Mathai Mariamma

H.G. Yakob Mar Elias is the current Metropolitan of the Brahmavar Diocese of Malankara Orthodox Syrian Church. He was born on 24 February 1953 to Chackaleth Viruthiyath Kizhakkethil Mathai and Mariamma.

== Early life ==
After taking his master's degree from Kerala University, he joined the Orthodox Theological Seminary, Kottayam, for theological studies. From the Orthodox Theological Seminary, Kottayam, he took Graduate Degree in Sacred Theology (GST) and the Bachelor of Divinity (BD) degree at the Senate of Serampore University.

== Ministry ==
Elias took several key positions of the church Position held – Manager, Mar Elia Chapel, Sasthamkotta, Director, St. Basil Bible School, Vice President, Orthodox Christian Youth Movement, Secretary, Kottayam Diocese, Member, Ecumenical Relations Committee.Member, Mission Tranining Centre, Member, Mavelikkara, Orthodox Bible Preparation Committee, Member, Malankara Sabha Editorial Board, Member, Oriental and Anglican Forum.

He was elected as the Metropolitan candidate on 17 February at the Malankara Association held at Sasthamkotta. He is consecrated as Metropolitan on 12 May 2010 at Mar Elia Cathedral, Kottayam. Elias is serving the Brahmavar Diocese as its Metropolitan.

Elias was appointed as the Metropolitan of the Brahmavar Diocese with its headquarters at Mangalore, by His Holiness Baselios Marthoma Didymus I through the Kalpana No.396/2010 dated 4–8–2010.

== The Brahmavar Diocese ==
As the current Metropolitan of the Brahmavar Diocese, Elias holds the responsibility of the following churches:

01. St. George Orthodox Cathedral, Abu Dhabi

02. Arangu St. George

03. Ariprod St.Thomas

04. Aravanchal St. George

05. Birikkulam St.Gregorios

06. Brahmavar St. Mary's Cathedral

07. Eattukudakka St.Mary's

08. Hegla Mar Gregorios

09. Ichilampady St.George

10. Kadumeni St.George

11. Kalanja St. Marys

12. Karayathumchal St.Mary's

13. Karuvamkayam Mar Gregorios

14. Karugunda St. George

15. Mangalore St. Gregorios

16. Nelliadi St. Gregorios

17. Padangady St. Mary's

18. Pathavu St. George

19. Renjilady St. Thomas

20. Kasargode St.Mary's

21. Kozhichal St.Mary's

22. Mardalam St.Mary's

23. Narasiharajapuram St.Mary's

24. Narkilakadu St.Mary's

25. Pakkanjikadu St.George

26. Panaji St.Mary's

27. Payyavor St. Gregorios

28. Sampiadi St.Mary's

29. Siddhapura St.Mary's

30. Thannir Panthal St.George

31. Vanchiyam St.George

32. Vasco-Da-Gama St.Mary's

33. Chuzhali St. George

34. Manipal St. Thomas

35. Ganganadu St. Gregorios

36. Shivmogga St. George

== Present life ==
Elias currently resides at Mount Horeb Bishop's House, Balikashram Road, Kankanady, Mangalore.
