= Saint Hugh =

Saint Hugh may refer to:

- Áed mac Bricc (died 589), Saint Hugh of Rahugh
- Hugh of Rouen (died 730), archbishop of Rouen and bishop of Paris and Bayeux
- Hugh of Cluny (1024–1109), influential leader of monastic orders
- Hugh of Châteauneuf, or Hugh of Grenoble (1052–1132), bishop of Grenoble
- Hugh of Lincoln (1135/1140–1200), bishop of Lincoln
- Little Saint Hugh of Lincoln, boy murdered in 1255
- Hugh dei Lippi Uggucioni (died 1282), one of the Seven Founders of the Servite Order

== See also ==
- St Hugh's (disambiguation)
