= Church of St Hugh of Lincoln, Letchworth =

Church in Hertfordshire, England

Coordinates: 51°58′34.7″N 0°13′44.8″W

St Hugh of Lincoln, Letchworth
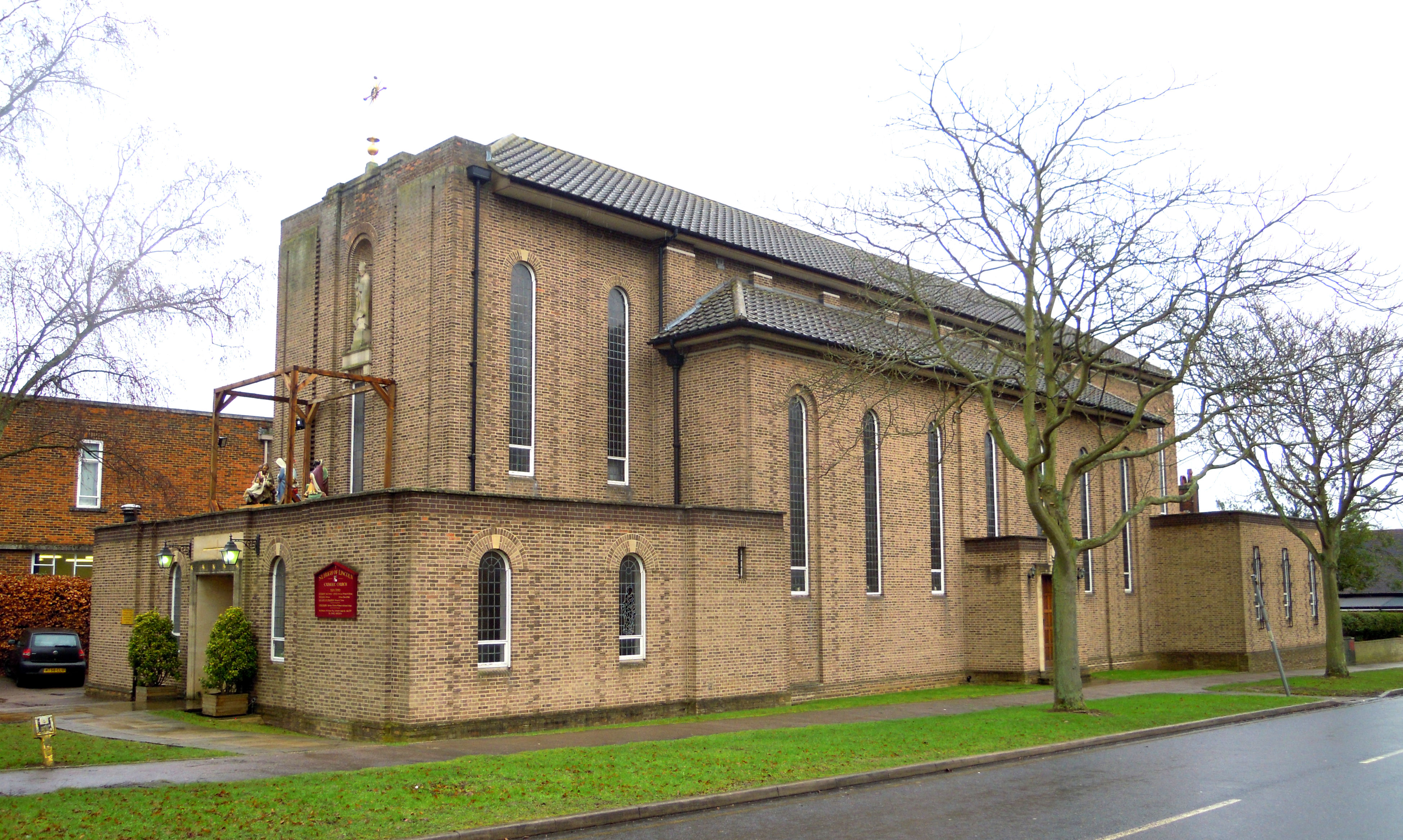
- Church of St Hugh of Lincoln in Letchworth in 2017
- St Hugh of Lincoln, Letchworth
- Denomination: Roman Catholic

History
- Dedication: St Hugh of Lincoln
- Consecrated: 2007

Administration
- Diocese: Westminster
- Deanery: Stevenage

Clergy
- Priest: James Garvey

The Church of St Hugh of Lincoln is a Catholic church in Letchworth, Hertfordshire founded by the scholar and priest Adrian Fortescue. The first church was consecrated in 1908 and was dedicated to St Hugh of Lincoln while the modern church which replaced it was built in 1963. It comes under the Diocese of Westminster.

== The original church - 1907-1963 ==
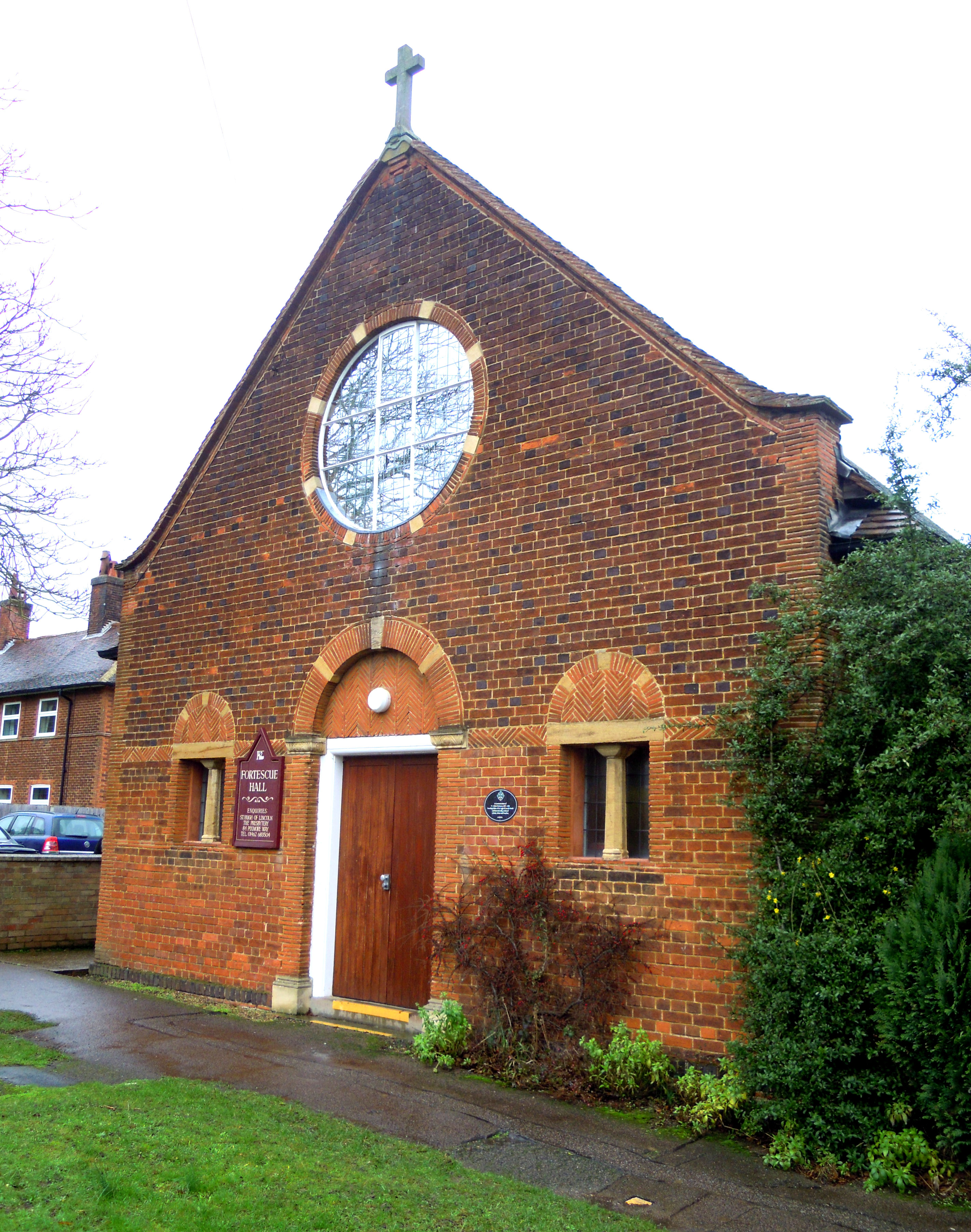
The original church of 1908, now 'Fortescue Hall'

When Adrian Fortescue was appointed Missionary Rector of Letchworth in Hertfordshire in November 1907 he faced the task of building a church from scratch. Much of the original church he designed and paid for personally, and parish records show that he in fact donated more each year than he received in his annual stipend. The first small church on the site in Pixmore Way opened in 1908 and was designed by Sir Charles Spooner RIBA with a Romanesque facade and was intended to be a temporary church with a presbytery, added in 1909. The church was blessed by Patrick Fenton, the Bishop of Amycla, on 6 September 1908 and was dedicated to St Hugh of Lincoln. Fortescue's scholarly interest in the Byzantine Church and his connection with craftsmen of the Arts and Crafts Movement influenced the design of the church's interior, various liturgical items and artwork from which can still be seen in the new church. Today this original church is the Church Hall and has been named 'Fortescue Hall' in memory of its founder. Gradually this church became famous for its music and rich liturgical life.

== The present church ==
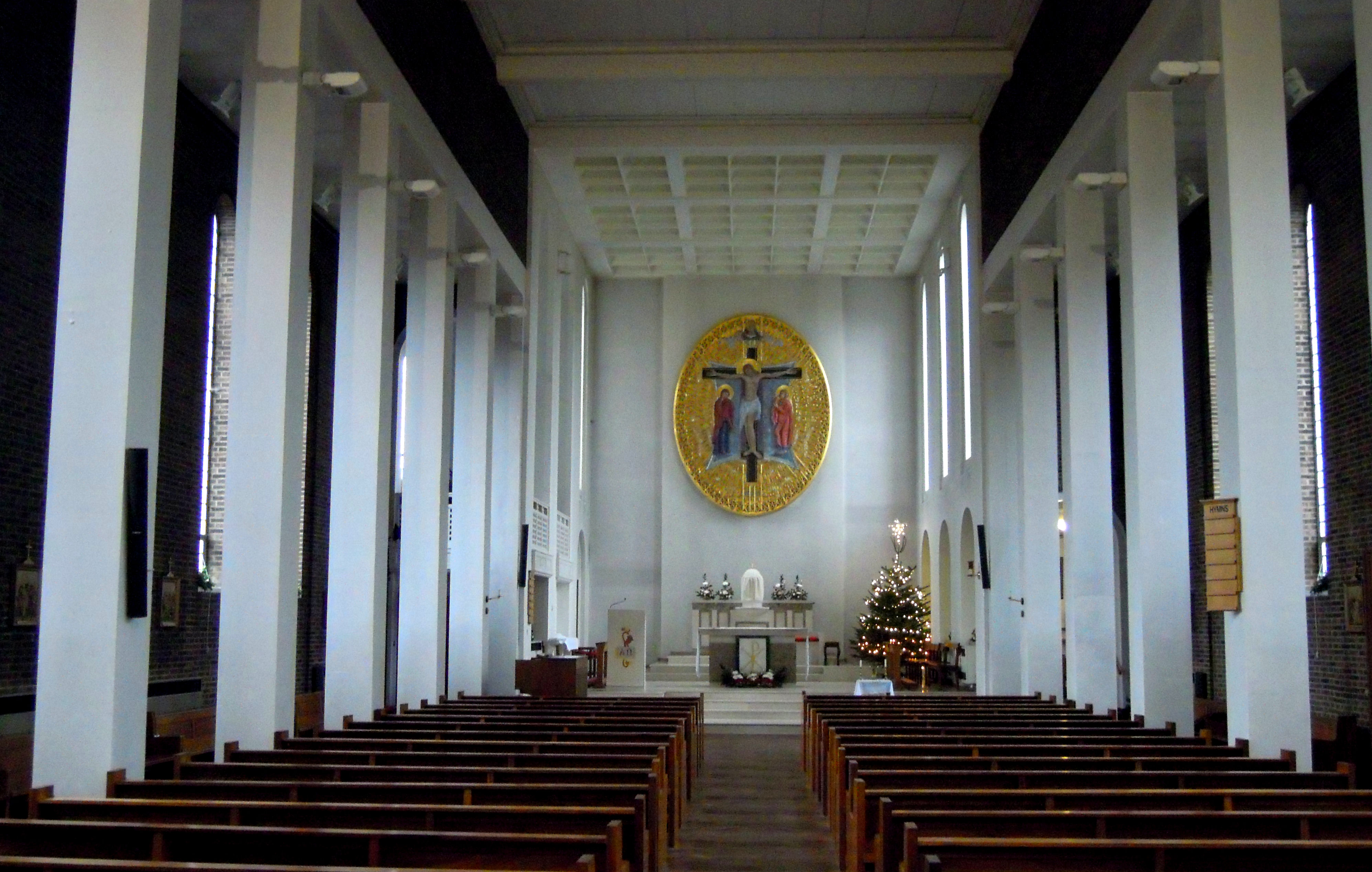
Looking East towards the Sanctuary

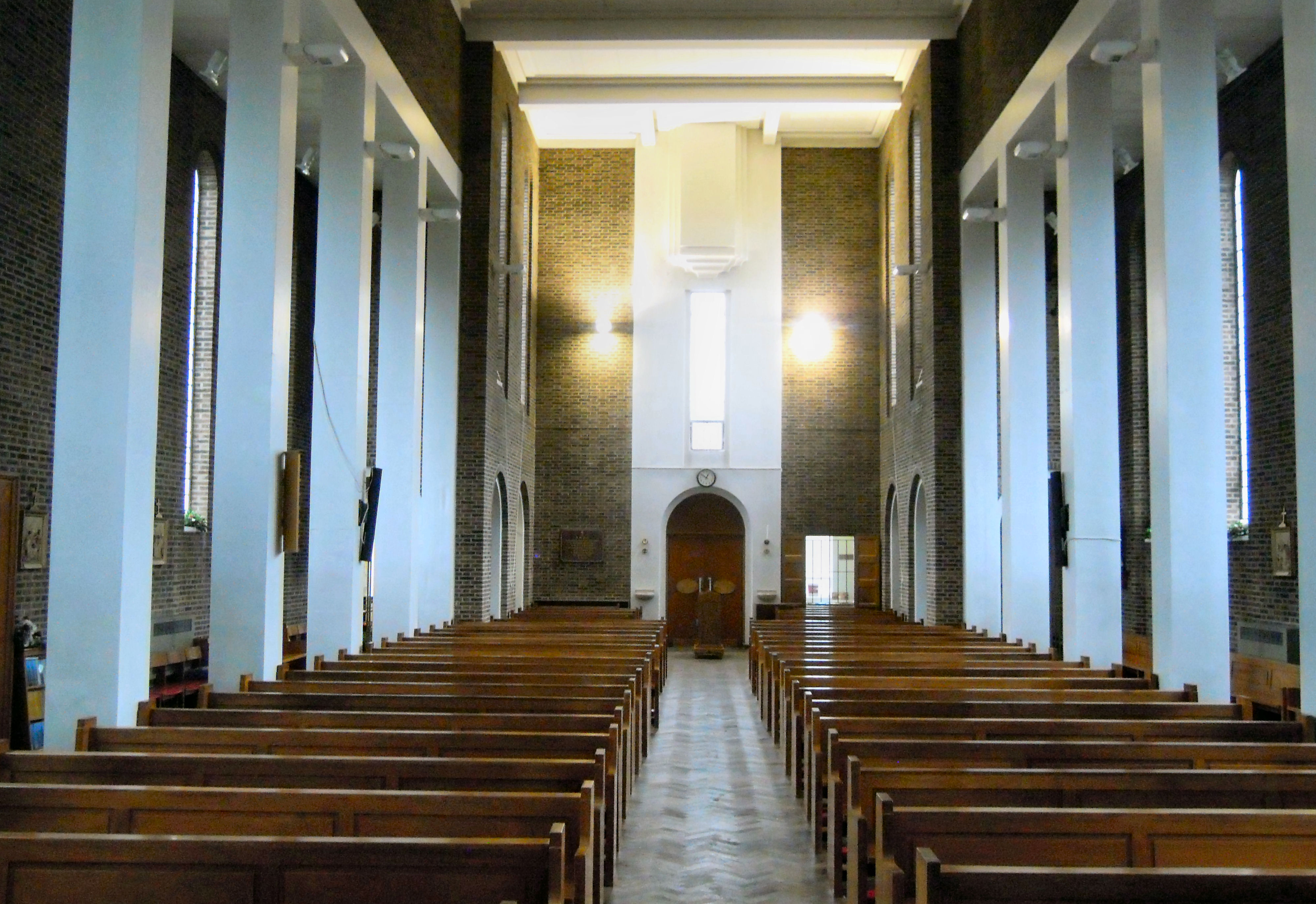
Looking West

The original church had always been intended to be temporary until funds could be found for a larger and permanent building and Fortescue created designs for a new church before his death in 1923. In 1938 a design for a new church was drawn up by John Edward Dixon-Spain of Nicholas and Dixon-Spain and Partners and building of this new church should have started in September 1939 but was interrupted by the outbreak of World War II. In the end work did not start until May 1961, still largely following Dixon-Spain's original stripped modern Romanesque design and with John Willmott & Sons of Hitchin as the builders. The church has a frame of reinforced concrete and steel which is externally clad in brick with Clipsham stone window and door surrounds. The nave is broad and long nave with narrow aisles and with a western narthex and baptistery and a Sanctuary and Lady Chapel to the south. The original flat roof was later replaced with a shallow-pitched concrete roof. The foundation stone was blessed by Cardinal William Godfrey on 7 April 1962, and the first Mass was held on 21 February 1963. Several church furnishings from the old church were moved into the new including the holy water font, the ciborium (removed in the renovations of 2007) and the four stained-glass windows and stone tablet dedicated to Fortescue. Also moved from the old church was the distinctive square alabaster baptismal font designed by Spooner which stands on stone columns and has the inscription ORATE PRO ANIMA EDMONDI FAVRIEL TREVELYAN DEF. XI DEC. MCMXI in memory of Dr Edmond Fauriel Trevelyan (1859-1911), a Fellow of the Royal College of Physicians and a Justice of the Peace.

The Lady Chapel has a marble altar inset with carved panels of loaves and fishes. The three stained-glass panels depicting the Virgin and Child, St Hugh and St Lawrence were brought here from the old church together with the engraved stone memorial to Adrian Fortescue.

Hanging in the Sanctuary is a large sixteen-feet in diameter carved icon of the Crucifixion of Jesus by Stephen Foster. In January 2007 at the beginning of the centenary year of the founding of St Hugh’s Church the Sanctuary and other areas of the church were renovated in order to conform with modern liturgical requirements. On 24 November 2007 the church was consecrated by Bishop George Stack as part of the same celebrations. In November 2013 Archbishop Vincent Nichols celebrated Mass in the church on the feast day of St Hugh of Lincoln in celebration of the 50th anniversary of the opening of the present church building.

== Gallery ==
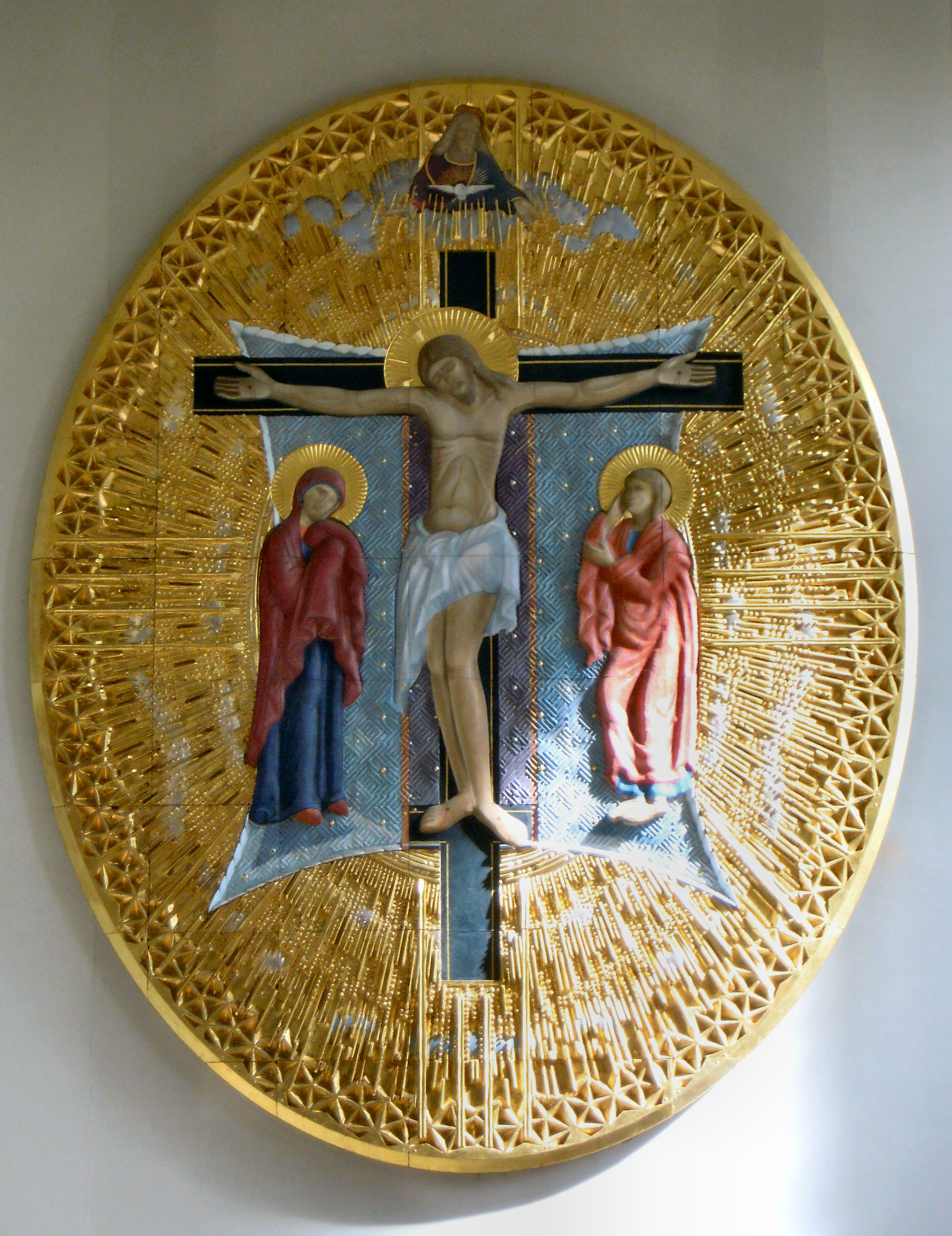
The carved icon by Stephen Foster

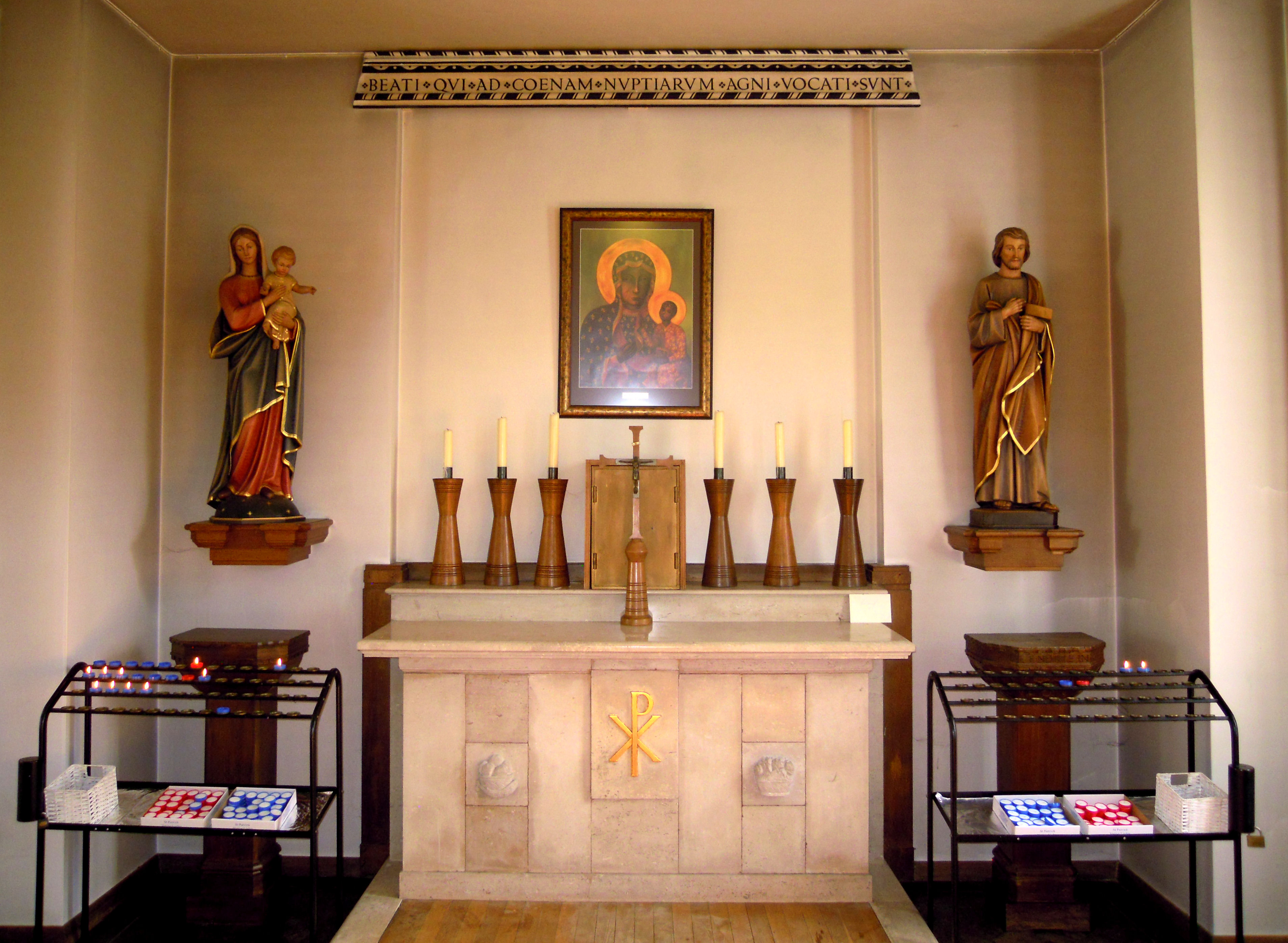
The Lady Chapel

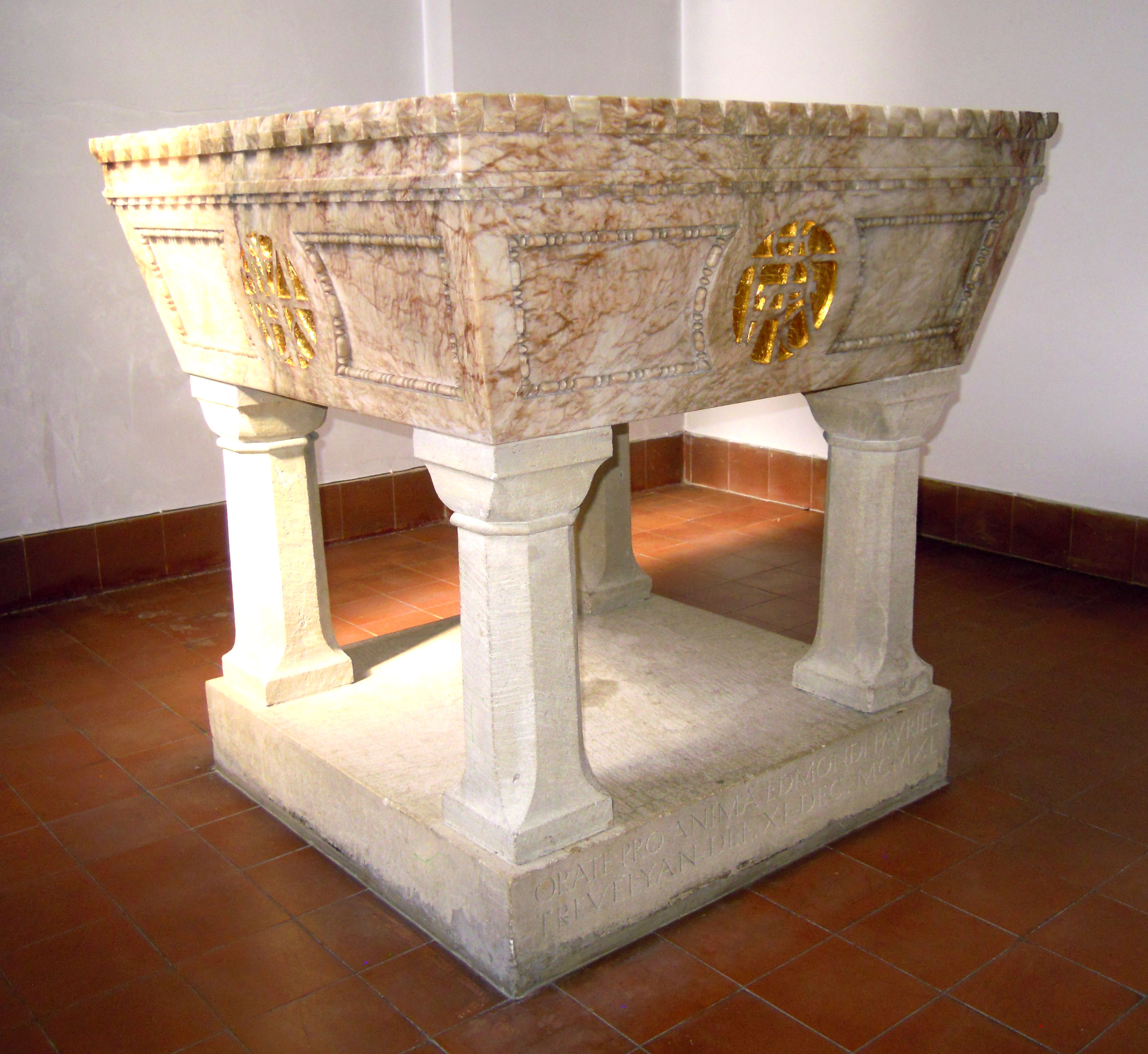
The alabaster baptismal font dates to 1911

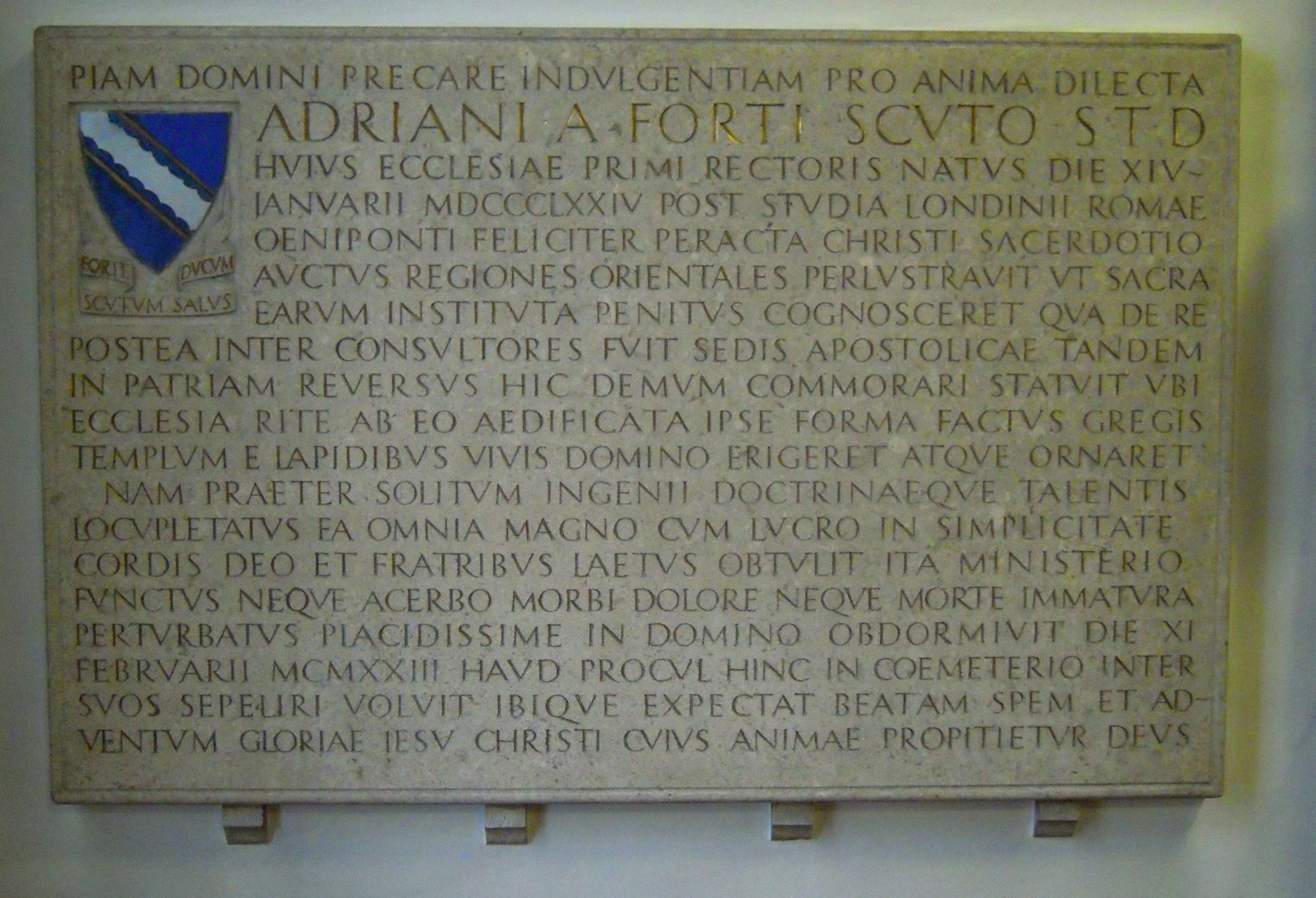
Memorial tablet to Adrian Fortescue

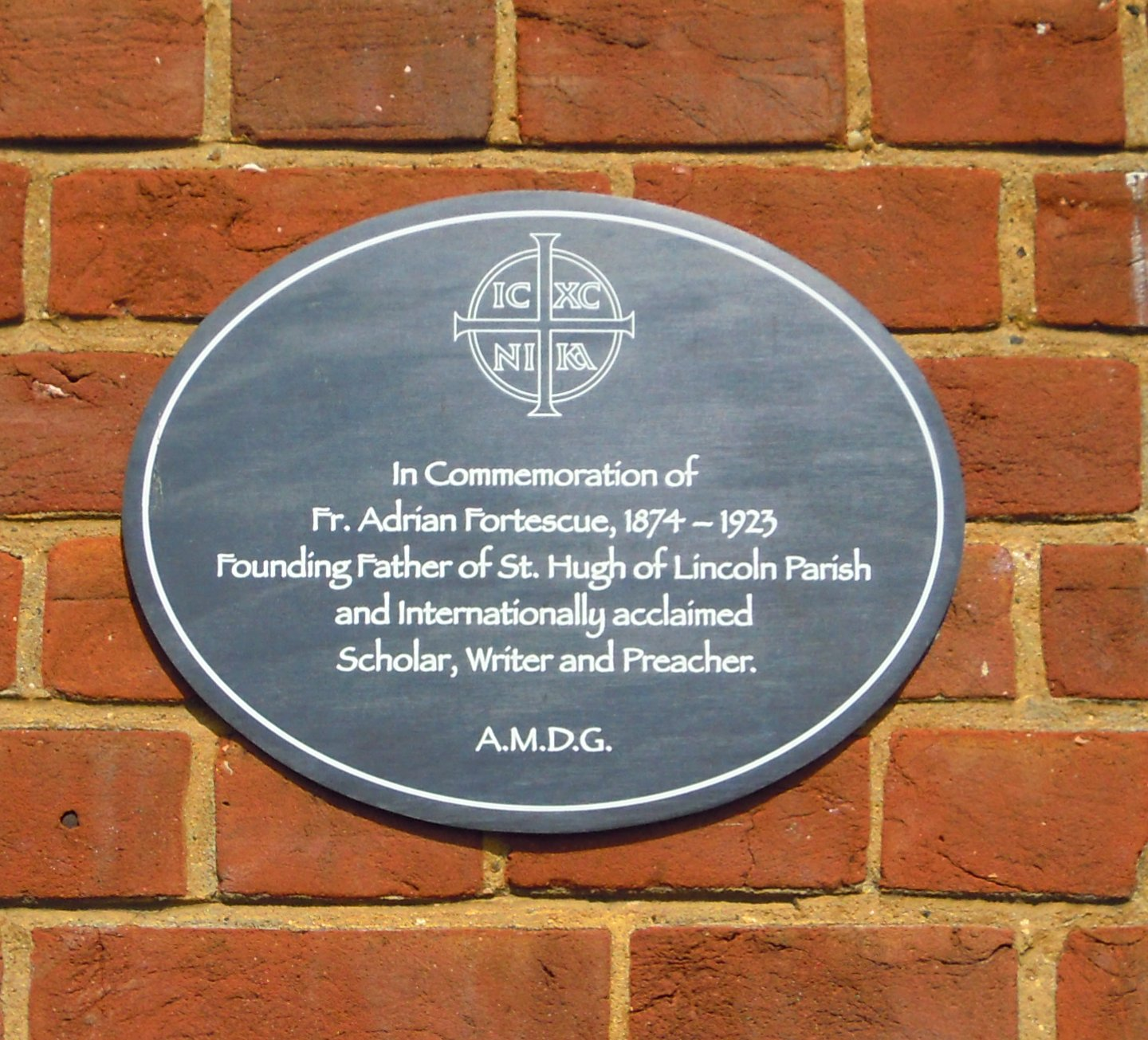
Plaque to Adrian Fortescue on the side of Fortescue Hall, the former church building
