= The Lesser Eastern Churches =

1913 book by Adrian Fortescue

The Lesser Eastern Churches is a book by Adrian Fortescue, published in London in 1913. It contains biographical material relating to the following saints:

- Mar Abba

== Sources ==
- Holweck, F. G., A Biographical Dictionary of the Saints. St. Louis, MO: B. Herder, 1924.
- The lesser eastern churches (1913)
