= Adrian Fortescue =

English Catholic priest and scholar (1874–1923)

The Reverend Adrian Fortescue
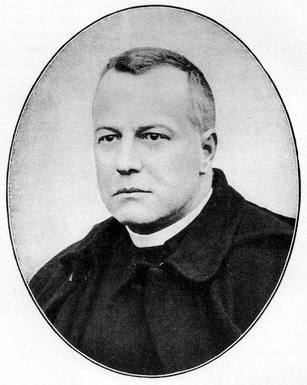
- Born: Adrian Henry Timothy Knottesford Fortescue; 14 January 1874; Hampstead, England
- Died: 11 February 1923 (aged 49); Letchworth, England
- Education: Scots College; University of Innsbruck
- Religion: Christianity (Roman Catholic)
- Church: Latin Church
- Ordained: 1898 (priest)
- Writings: Ceremonies of the Roman Rite Described (1917)
- Congregations served: Church of St Hugh of Lincoln, Letchworth

Adrian Henry Timothy Knottesford Fortescue (14 January 1874 – 11 February 1923) was an English Catholic priest and polymath. An influential liturgist, artist, calligrapher, composer, polyglot, amateur photographer, Byzantine scholar, and adventurer, he was also the founder of the Church of St Hugh of Lincoln in Letchworth.

== Biography ==
=== Early life and education ===
Adrian Fortescue, a direct descendant of the martyr Adrian Fortescue (died 1539), was born on 14 January 1874 in Hampstead, London, into a Midland county family of high position. His father was Edward Fortescue, a renowned high church Anglican clergyman who was "highly regarded as a preacher and retreat master" and an active participant in the Anglo-Catholic Oxford Movement, before he was received into the Catholic Church. His mother, Gertrude Martha Robins, was the daughter of Sanderson Robins, another Anglican clergyman, and Caroline Gertrude Foster-Barham, the scion of the Foster-Barham family of Jamaican plantation owners and granddaughter of the 8th Earl of Thanet.

In 1891 Fortescue entered the Scots' College in Rome, where, due to his exceptional musical talent, he was soon appointed organist. He was awarded the degree of Bachelor of Divinity in 1892 and his PhD in 1894, when he entered the theological faculty at Innsbruck University. He was ordained to the priesthood on 27 March 1898 by Simon Aichner, Bishop of Brixen.

Between 1899 and 1905 Fortescue passed doctoral examinations in moral theology, dogma, ecclesiastical history, canon law, Arabic, biblical science, and Semitic languages. On 10 June 1905, he was awarded the degree of Doctor of Divinity, making him the very rare recipient of a triple doctorate. For his scholarship, Fortescue was awarded a prize by the Emperor Franz Joseph I of Austria.

Fortescue was also a well-known adventurer, travelling to the Middle East, Asia Minor, and Greece, among other places. In the process, he learned Syrian Arabic, some Turkish, and Persian (he was already fluent in Greek from his academic studies).

At the time of his death, Fortescue was professor of church history at St Edmund's College, Ware, the oldest Catholic school in England.

=== Ministry ===
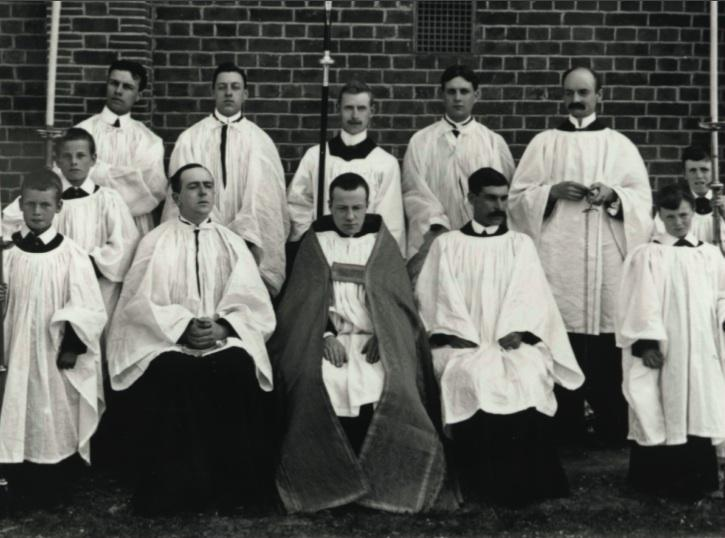
Altar servers of St Hugh's, Letchworth (c. 1910); Fortescue is vested in cope, in centre.

After a number of temporary positions, interrupted by his doctoral examinations, Fortescue was eventually appointed Missionary Rector of Letchworth in Hertfordshire in November 1907. There he faced the task of building a church from scratch. Much of the church he designed and paid for personally, and parish records show that he in fact donated more each year than he received in his annual stipend. In time the beautiful little church, dedicated to Hugh of Lincoln, became renowned for its music and rich liturgical life.

Although Fortescue's personal inclination was for the life of a scholar, his sense of duty would never allow him to put his scholarly pursuits before the care of the souls entrusted to him. He would give the last penny in his pocket to help a needy parishioner, and frequently found himself in financial difficulties as a result of his generosity. He never refused to see a caller, however inconvenient it might be for him to interrupt his work.

=== Death ===
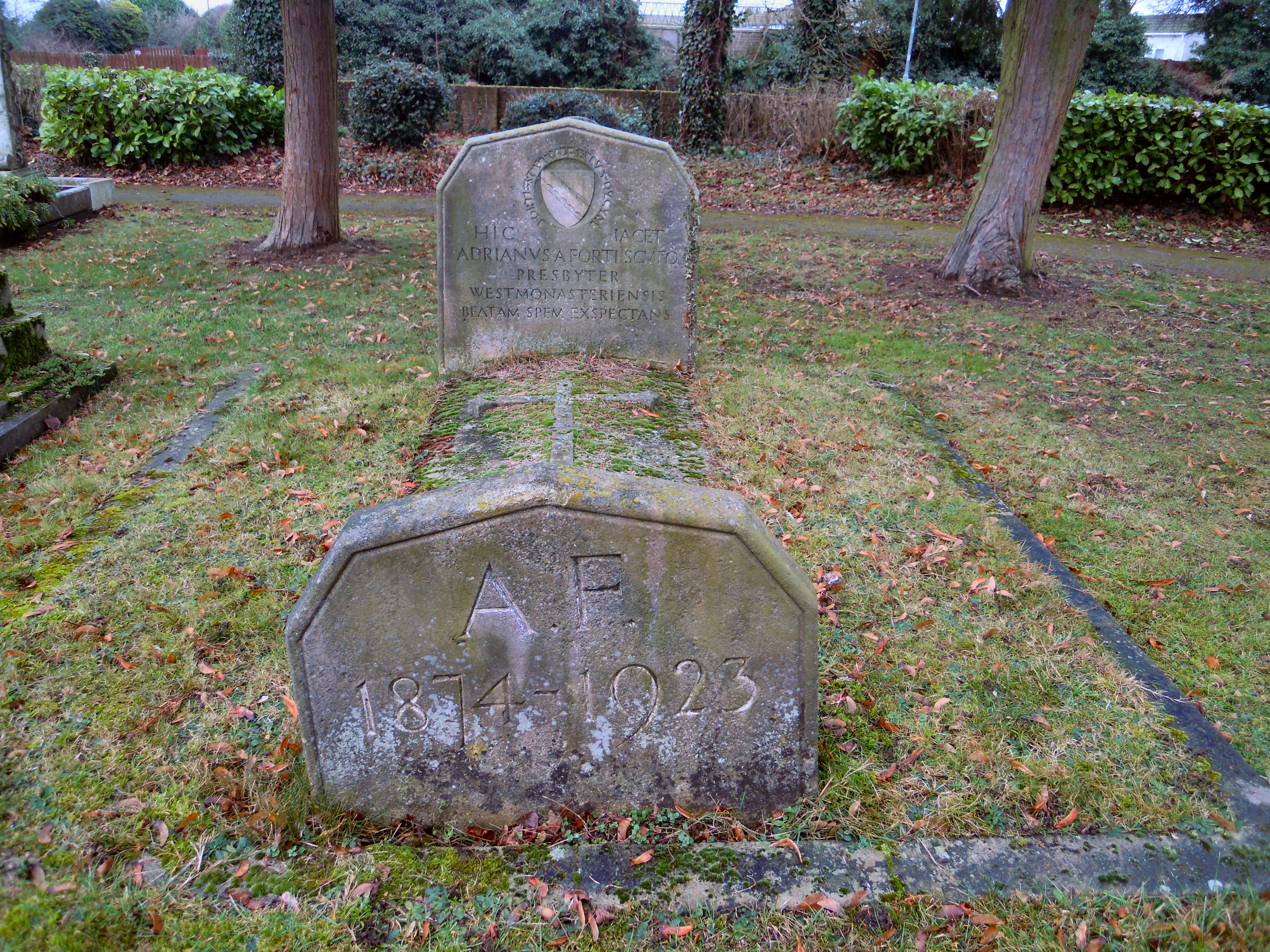
Fortescue's grave in Letchworth Cemetery

On 20 December 1922, Fortescue was diagnosed with cancer. He preached his last sermon on 31 December, a simple but profound lesson on the reality of the Incarnation of Christ, ending with the words, "That is all I have to say." On 3 January 1923 he left Letchworth for Dollis Hill Hospital, where he died of cancer on 11 February. Against the wishes of his family, he was buried at Letchworth Cemetery, among his own parishioners.

== Works ==
The best-known of Fortescue's publications during his lifetime was Ceremonies of the Roman Rite Described, which he actually wrote not out of academic interest but to raise funds for construction on his church.

In 1913 Fortescue compiled a book of Latin Hymns which he originally gathered for the use of his parishioners, providing his own English prose translations. He also contributed many articles to the Catholic Encyclopedia (1907–1913), and it is in this context that his work has the most public familiarity today.

With his love of history and skill with languages, Fortescue devoted much study to the origin and history of the Eastern Churches, both Catholic and Orthodox. Among his most famous works are The Orthodox Eastern Church and The Lesser Eastern Churches.

Fortescue was also an artist of considerable talent, especially in the media of watercolour, drawing and calligraphy. He was also a recognised authority on heraldry, and his own designs were widely admired in his day. A memorial exhibition of Adrian Fortescue's work was organised in the Letchworth Public Library in 1923.

== Memorials ==
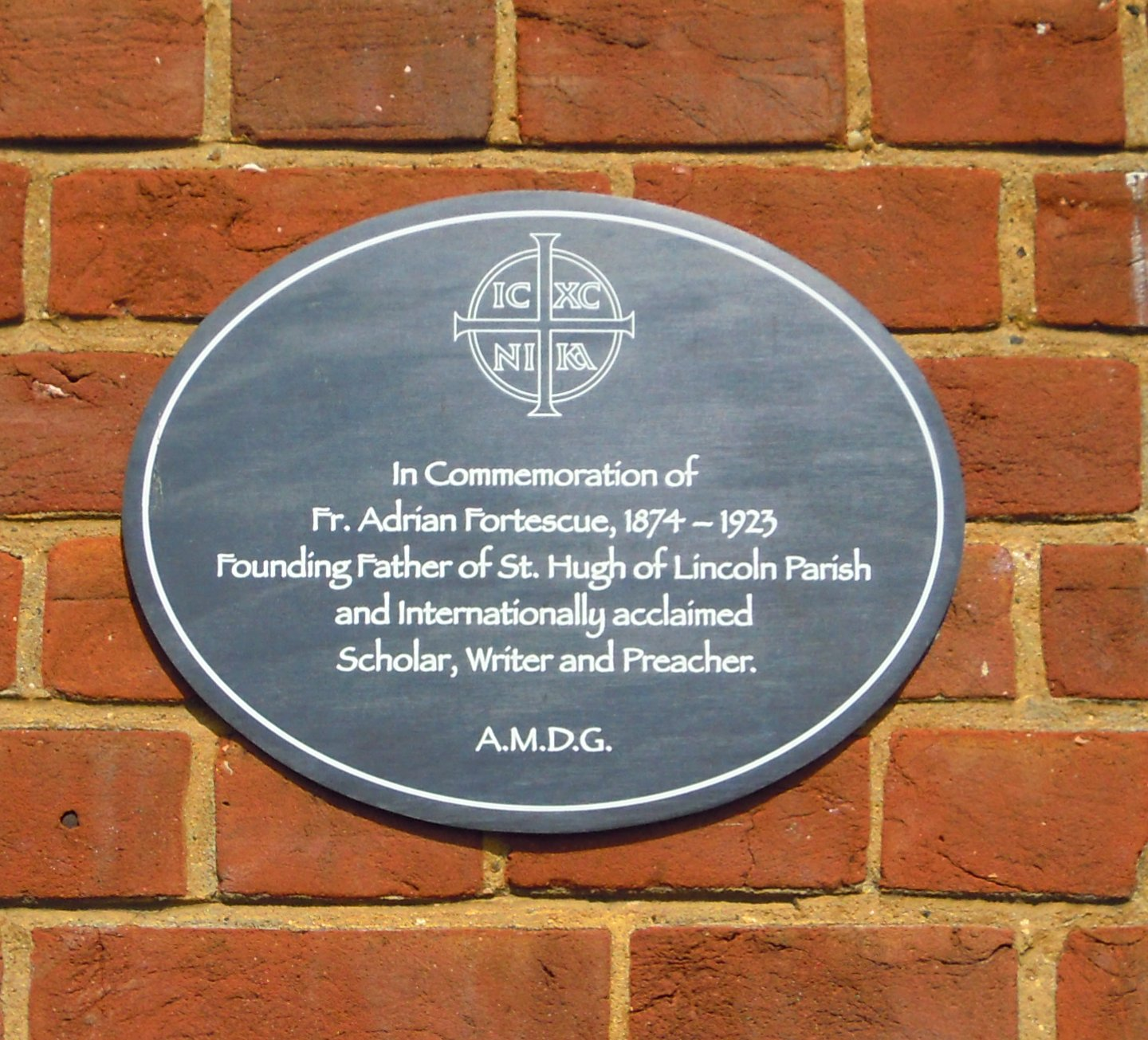
A plaque to Adrian Fortescue on the side of Fortescue Hall at the Church of St Hugh of Lincoln in Letchworth

An exhibition about Fortescue and the Church of St Hugh of Lincoln he founded was produced by the First Garden City Heritage Museum, in Letchworth Garden City. The exhibition featured rare and special objects relating to Fortescue and the church, and ran from 5 November 2007 until 26 January 2008.

The First Garden City Heritage Museum holds material relating to Fortescue, as well as copies of the exhibition text, images and display material.

There are plaques dedicated to Fortescue in the Church of St Hugh of Lincoln in Letchworth.

== Selected bibliography ==
- Fortescue, Adrian (1908). The Greek Fathers (EBook). London: The Catholic Truth Society. p. 282.
- Fortescue, Adrian (1908). The Orthodox Eastern Church (EBook). London: The Catholic Truth Society. p. 497.
- Cobham, Claude Delaval; Duckworth, H.T.F.; Fortescue, Adrian; Gedeon, Manouel Io. (1911). The Patriarchs of Constantinople (EBook). London: Cambridge University Press. p. 122.
- Fortescue, Adrian (1912). The Mass: A Study of the Roman Liturgy (EBook). London, New York: Longmans, Green & Co. p. 448.
- Fortescue, Adrian (1913). The Lesser Eastern Churches (EBook). London: The Catholic Truth Society. p. 500.
- Fortescue, Adrian (1917). Donatism (EBook). London: Burns & Oates. p. 68.
- Fortescue, Adrian (1918). The Ceremonies of the Roman Rite (EBook). London: Burns & Oates Ltd. p. 484.
- Fortescue, Adrian (1934). Ceremonies of the Roman Rite Described. Burns, Oates & Washbourne ltd; 5th ed edition.
- Fortescue, Adrian (1994). Latin Hymns. reprint: Roman Catholic Books. ISBN 0-912141-13-1.
- Fortescue, Adrian (2000). Orthodox Eastern Church. reprint: Adamant Media Corporation. ISBN 1-4212-4904-9.
- Fortescue, Adrian (2001). Lesser Eastern Churches (The Eastern Churches Trilogy). reprint: Gorgias Press. ISBN 0-9715986-2-2.

== See also ==
- History of Eastern Christianity
- History of the Eastern Orthodox Church
- Quinisext Council
