= Hugh of Lincoln =

12th-century English bishop and saint

Saint Hugh of Lincoln OCart
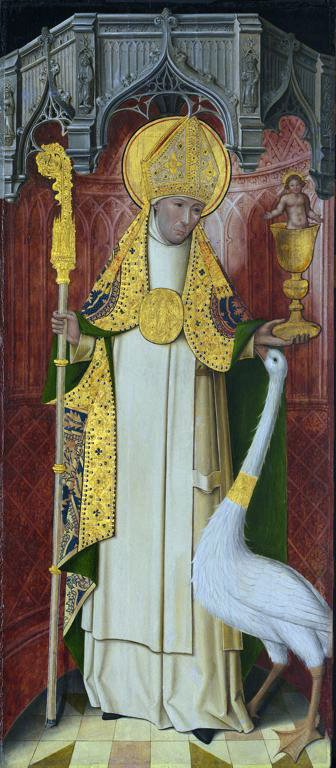
- St Hugh of Lincoln with his swan Altarpiece showing the saint in the Carthusian habit from the Charterhouse of Saint-Honoré, Thuison, near Abbeville, France (c. 1490-1500)

Bishop of Lincoln
- Born: c. 1140; Avalon, Holy Roman Empire
- Died: 16 November 1200 (aged 59–60); London, England
- Venerated in: Catholic Church; Anglican Communion
- Canonized: 17 February 1220 by Pope Honorius III
- Major shrine: St Mary's Cathedral; Lincoln, England Parkminster Charterhouse; West Sussex
- Feast: 16 November (Catholic Church); 17 November (Church of England)
- Attributes: a white swan, bishop's attire, holding a chalice from which Christ emerges
- Patronage: sick children, sick people, cobblers, swans, and the Roman Catholic Diocese of Nottingham

Hugh of Lincoln OCart (c. 1140 (Note: In their biographies of Hugh, both Thurston and Marson put his year of birth as being in 1140. Woolley gave his year of birth as being "at about 1140.") – 16 November 1200), also known as Hugh of Avalon, was a Burgundian-born Carthusian monk, bishop of Lincoln in the Kingdom of England, and Catholic saint. His feast is observed by Catholics on 16 November and by Anglicans on 17 November.

== Biography ==
Hugh was born in the Alpine village of Avalon, Imperial Burgundy, in what was then the Holy Roman Empire, and what is today southeastern France. Hugh’s father Guillaume was the sieur d’Avalon, making him a knight enmeshed in a web of feudal obligations leading ultimately to the Holy Roman Emperor. Hugh's mother, Anne de Theys, enjoyed a reputation for kindness and was known to wash the sores of lepers (employing young Hugh to hold the towels). She died when Hugh was about 8 years old.

Upon the death of Hugh's mother, his father sent him to the nearby community of Canons Regular of St. Augustine at Villarbenoît (sometimes Villard-Benoît) to receive a religious education, probably in the company of other sons of the nobility. Hugh's father, presumably brokenhearted and war-weary, also retired to the community shortly thereafter – entrusting his lands to the care of his two eldest sons (Guillaume and Pierre) who were eager to continue the martial tradition.

At the age of 15, Hugh made his profession as a Canon Regular (with the rank of novice). He was ordained a deacon at the age of 19. Shortly thereafter, he was sent to the tiny parish of Saint-Maximin to assist an elderly parish priest who could only just manage to perform church services but needed support for everything else. Hugh remained subject to the prior of the small community of Canons Regular centered at Villarbenoît (which had 12 inmates at that time). Canons Regular were not exactly monks, but were essentially communities of priests (and their subordinates) abiding by a monastic rule, usually the Rule of St. Augustine. Of their mission, David Hugh Farmer writes that:

[T]hey provided a worthy way of life which was neither that of the ordinary priest nor that of the monk... Their chosen aim was to restore what had been neglected, to rebuild what had decayed in the life of the Church. The care of parishes, education, nursing the sick, the refurbishing of ruined shrines and churches: these were their normal activities wherever they were found. In their chosen and humdrum obscurity they performed necessary tasks which others had relinquished. Seldom large or famous, these communities did not often produce bishops, scholars or canonized saints.

While Hugh enjoyed ministering to the community, he ultimately sought a more contemplative existence offered only in the cloistered confines of a secluded monastery. And, for this purpose, there was none better than the one into which he and the Prior of Villarbenoît walked one fateful day: the Grande Chartreuse (20 km north of Grenoble), the Mother House of the Carthusian order. Adam of Eynsham, Hugh's hagiographer, tells us that Hugh:

[G]azed with awe at this place, situated almost in the clouds and close to the sky, far removed from the turmoil of almost all earthly things. He realized the great opportunity it offered of living alone with God, for which aim existed the rich collection of books, the long hours devoted to reading and the unbroken silence of prayer. The whole arrangement of the monastery seemed to be designed just for this. He observed the physical austerities of the monks, their peace of mind, their liberty of spirit, their cheerful demeanour and simplicity of speech. They had separate cells but their purpose was one. They combined solitude with community life. Each lived alone lest he should be hindered by another, but each lived in community so that none should lack brotherly help.

Thus, in 1163, Hugh left the small community of Canons Regular of St. Augustine at Villarbenoît to become a Carthusian monk at the Grande Chartreuse. He spent the bulk of his 20s in prayer and contemplation and was during that time ordained a priest. In his early 30s, he was made procurator, responsible for all of the temporal affairs of the monastery. After nearly a decade in this office, Hugh had (unwittingly) cultivated a reputation for efficiency and piety that reached far and wide – even across the channel to Henry II of England. The Count of Maurienne, whom Henry had employed on a marriage embassy and whose lands were near the Grande Chartreuse, extolled the virtues of the Carthusians to the King. And, according to Adam of Eynsham, he was particularly lavish in his praise of Hugh:

You will find united in this one individual all the patience, courtesy, courage, gentleness and other virtues possible in any mortal man. His presence will annoy nobody, he will not be shunned as a foreigner, rather everyone will treat him as a neighbour, as an old friend or as a brother. He loves the whole human race like himself: his abundant charity cherishes all men.

Henry found himself in need of such a person. In 1170, Henry II had (intentionally or otherwise) precipitated the death of his one-time friend, the Archbishop of Canterbury, Thomas Becket. This was a sin for which he famously suffered himself to be scourged (flogged), but part of his penance also involved the foundation of three monastic houses in England (possibly in lieu of going on crusade which he had initially promised to do). One of these three monastic houses was a Carthusian house (corrupted in English to 'charterhouse'), the Witham Charterhouse, Somerset, which had been established by a group of monks sent from the Grande Chartreuse in 1178/79. It was, however, facing several difficulties. The first prior (Narbert) found he was not up to the task and when the second prior (Hamon) died unexpectedly very little had been accomplished. And so Henry II, hearing of Hugh's reputation via the Count of Maurienne, sent for Hugh to be the third prior of Witham Charterhouse.

To become the prior of the first Carthusian monastery in England was a great honour, but for Hugh it was an honour he could well do without. To him it represented only a distraction from prayer and contemplation. The prior of the Grande Chartreuse Guigo II also opposed the nomination. It took the combined efforts of the Reginald Fitz Jocelin, Bishop of Bath (in whose diocese Witham Charterhouse, Somerset, was located), and Jean de Sassenage, Bishop of Grenoble (in whose diocese the Grande Chartreuse was located), to compel Hugh to accept.

Thus, Hugh set out for England and reached Witham in 1179. Upon arrival, he found the monks in dire straits, living in wattled huts and with no plans yet advanced for the construction of more substantial monastery buildings. The establishment of the monastery had entailed the displacement of scores of peasants for whom little provision had been made and who were, consequently, inhospitable. The Carthusian monks were also far from content, complaining bitterly of the lack of building materials, money, and supplies promised to them. Hugh took these challenges, like all things, as a test. Henry was at that time at a manor or hunting lodge (presumably in nearby Selwood Forest) and thither Hugh went with a company of monks. Instead of finding fault with Henry, as one of his monastic companions had done, he told the king:

I have not lost confidence in you, lord king. Rather do I sympathize with you because so many occupations and distractions prevent you concerning yourself with your soul’s salvation. You are indeed very busy, but with God’s help you will complete the good work you have begun.

The intercession was successful and work began to proceed apace. Hugh's first attention focused on the building of the Charterhouse. He prepared his plans and submitted them for royal approbation, exacting full compensation from the king for any tenants on the royal estate who would have to be evicted to make room for the building. Hugh presided over the new house until 1186, attracting many to the community. Among the frequent visitors was King Henry, for the charterhouse lay near the borders of the king's chase in Selwood Forest, a favourite hunting-ground.

In 1186, Henry summoned a council of bishops and barons at Eynsham Abbey to deliberate on the state of the Church and on the filling of vacant bishoprics, including Lincoln. On 25 May the cathedral chapter of Lincoln was ordered to elect a new bishop, and Hugh was elected. Hugh insisted on a second, private election by the canons, securely in their chapterhouse at Lincoln rather than in the king's chapel; the result confirmed his election. Lincoln was the largest diocese in England, encompassing some nine counties.

Hugh was consecrated Bishop of Lincoln on 21 September 1186 at Westminster. Almost immediately he established his independence of the crown, excommunicating a royal forester and refusing to seat one of Henry's courtly nominees as a prebendary of Lincoln; he softened the king's anger by his diplomatic address and tactful charm. After the excommunications, he came upon the king hunting and was greeted with dour silence. He waited several minutes and the king called for a needle to sew up a leather bandage on his finger. Eventually Hugh said, with gentle mockery, "How much you remind me of your cousins of Falaise" (where William I's unmarried mother Herleva, a tanner's daughter, had come from). At this Henry just burst out laughing and was reconciled.

As a bishop, Hugh was exemplary, constantly in residence or travelling within his diocese, generous with his charity, and scrupulous in the appointments he made. He raised the quality of education at the cathedral school. Hugh was also prominent in trying to protect the Jews, great numbers of whom lived in Lincoln, in the persecution they suffered at the beginning of Richard I's reign (1189-1199), and he put down popular violence against them – as later occurred following the 1255 death of Little Saint Hugh of Lincoln – in several places.

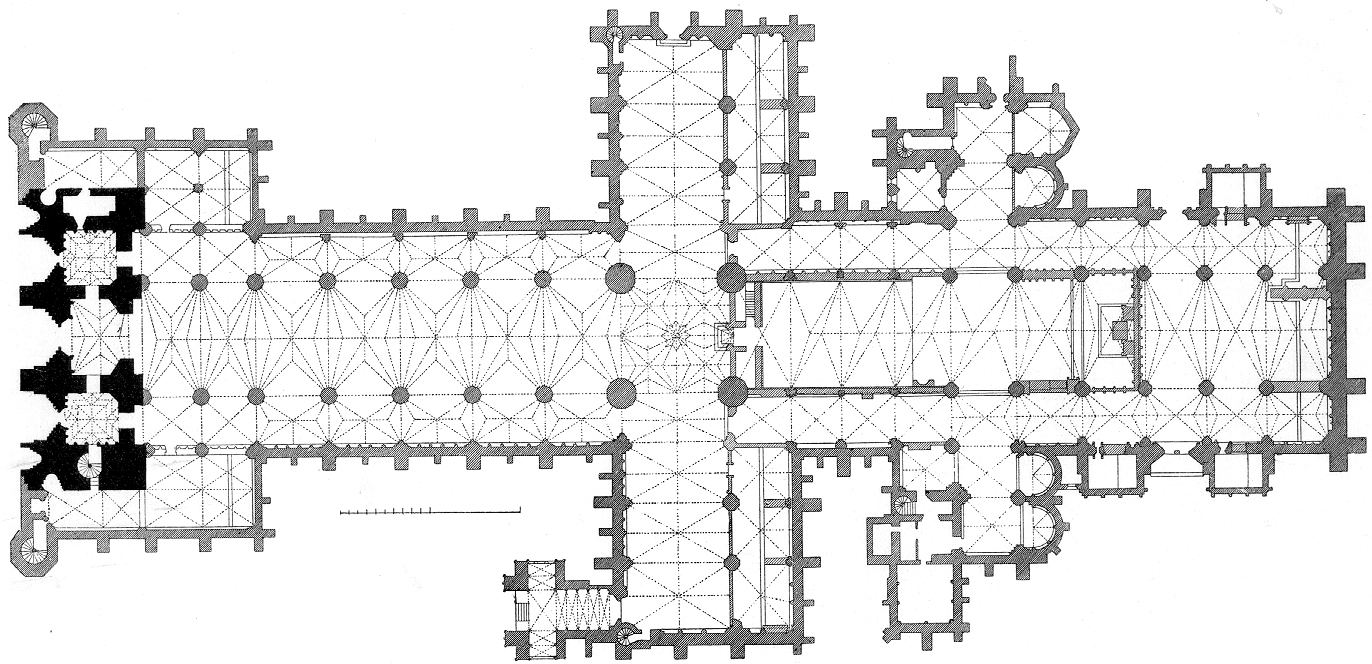
A plan of Lincoln Cathedral drawn by G Dehio (died 1932)

An earthquake had badly damaged Lincoln Cathedral in 1185, and Hugh set about rebuilding and greatly enlarging the structure in the new Gothic style; however, he only lived to see the choir well begun. In 1194, he (re)built St Mary Magdalen's Church, Oxford. Along with Bishop Herbert of Salisbury, Hugh resisted the king's demand for 300 knights for a year's service in his French wars; the entire revenue of both men's offices was then seized by royal agents.

As one of the premier bishops of the Kingdom of England Hugh more than once accepted the role of diplomat to France for King Richard and then for King John in 1199, a trip that ruined his health. He consecrated St Giles' Church, Oxford, in 1200. There is a cross consisting of interlaced circles cut into the western column of the tower that is believed to commemorate this. Also in commemoration of the consecration, St Giles' Fair was established and continues to take place each September to this day. While attending a national council in London, a few months later, Hugh was stricken with an unnamed ailment and died two months later on 16 November 1200. He was buried in Lincoln Cathedral.

Bishop Hugh was responsible for the building of the first (wooden) Bishop's Palace at Buckden in Huntingdonshire, halfway between Lincoln and London. Later additions to the Palace were more substantial, and a tall brick tower was added in 1475, protected by walls and a moat, and surrounded by an outer bailey. It was used by the bishops until 1842. The Palace, now known as Buckden Towers, is owned by the Claretians and is used as a retreat and conference centre. A Catholic church, dedicated to Saint Hugh, stands on the site.

== Veneration ==
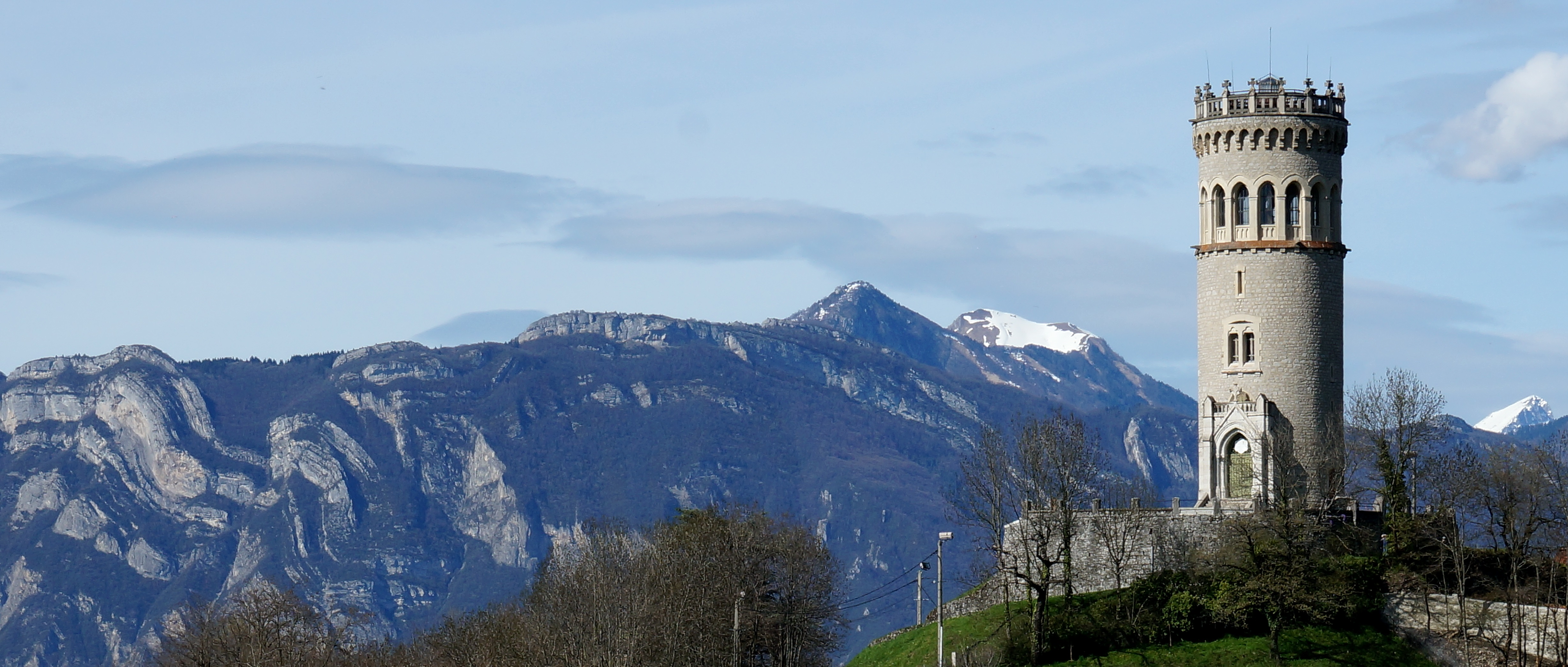
Tour d'Avalon, Saint-Maximin, Isère, marking St Hugh's birthplace

Hugh was canonised by Pope Honorius III on 17 February 1220, and is the patron saint of sick children, sick people, cobblers, and swans. Hugh is honoured in the Church of England with a Lesser Festival and in the Episcopal Church (USA) on 17 November.

Hugh's Vita, or written life, was composed by his chaplain Adam of Eynsham, a Benedictine monk and his constant associate; it remains in manuscript form in the Bodleian Library in Oxford.

Hugh is the eponym of St Hugh's College, Oxford, where a 1926 statue of the saint stands on the stairs of the Howard Piper Library. In his right hand, he holds an effigy of Lincoln Cathedral, and his left hand rests on the head of a swan.

At Avalon, a round tower in the Romantic Gothic style was built by the Carthusians in 1895 in Hugh's honour on the site of the castle where he was born.

== Iconography ==
Hugh's primary emblem is a white swan, in reference to the story of the swan of Stow, Lincolnshire (site of a palace of the bishops of Lincoln) which had a deep and lasting friendship with the saint, even guarding him while he slept. The swan would follow him about, and was his constant companion while he was at Lincoln. Hugh loved all the animals in the monastery gardens, especially a wild swan that would eat from his hand and follow him about, and yet the swan would attack anyone else who came near Hugh.

== Legacy ==
Both Buckden Towers, and the local Roman Catholic Church in nearby St Neots, are administered by the Claretians. In Lincoln, there is the Roman Catholic St Hugh's Church. There are many parish churches dedicated to St Hugh of Lincoln throughout England including the Church of St Hugh of Lincoln in Letchworth founded by Adrian Fortescue.

A number of churches are dedicated to St Hugh of Lincoln in the United States. These include St Hugh of Lincoln Roman Catholic Church, Huntington Station, New York and St Hugh of Lincoln Roman Catholic Church in Milwaukee, Wisconsin, St Hugh Roman Catholic Church and School in Coconut Grove, Miami, Florida. There are also Episcopal churches dedicated to him in Elgin, Illinois; and Allyn, Washington.

In 2018 St Hugh was made a subject of the BBC Radio 4 drama The Man who bit Mary Magdalene by Colin Bytheway, starring David Jason as the bishop in search of relics that would help in the construction of Lincoln Cathedral.

== Sources ==
- British History Online Bishops of Lincoln accessed on 28 October 2007
- King, Richard John Handbook to the Cathedrals of England: Eastern Division (1862) (On-line text).
- La tour d'Avalon accessed on 28 October 2007 – In French
- Fryde, E. B.; Greenway, D. E.; Porter, S.; Roy, I. (1996). Handbook of British Chronology (Third revised ed.). Cambridge: Cambridge University Press. ISBN 0-521-56350-X.

Catholic Church titles
Preceded by Walter de Coutances	Bishop of Lincoln; 1186–1200	Succeeded by William de Blois
