= Saint-Maximin, Isère =

Saint-Maximin
- Commune
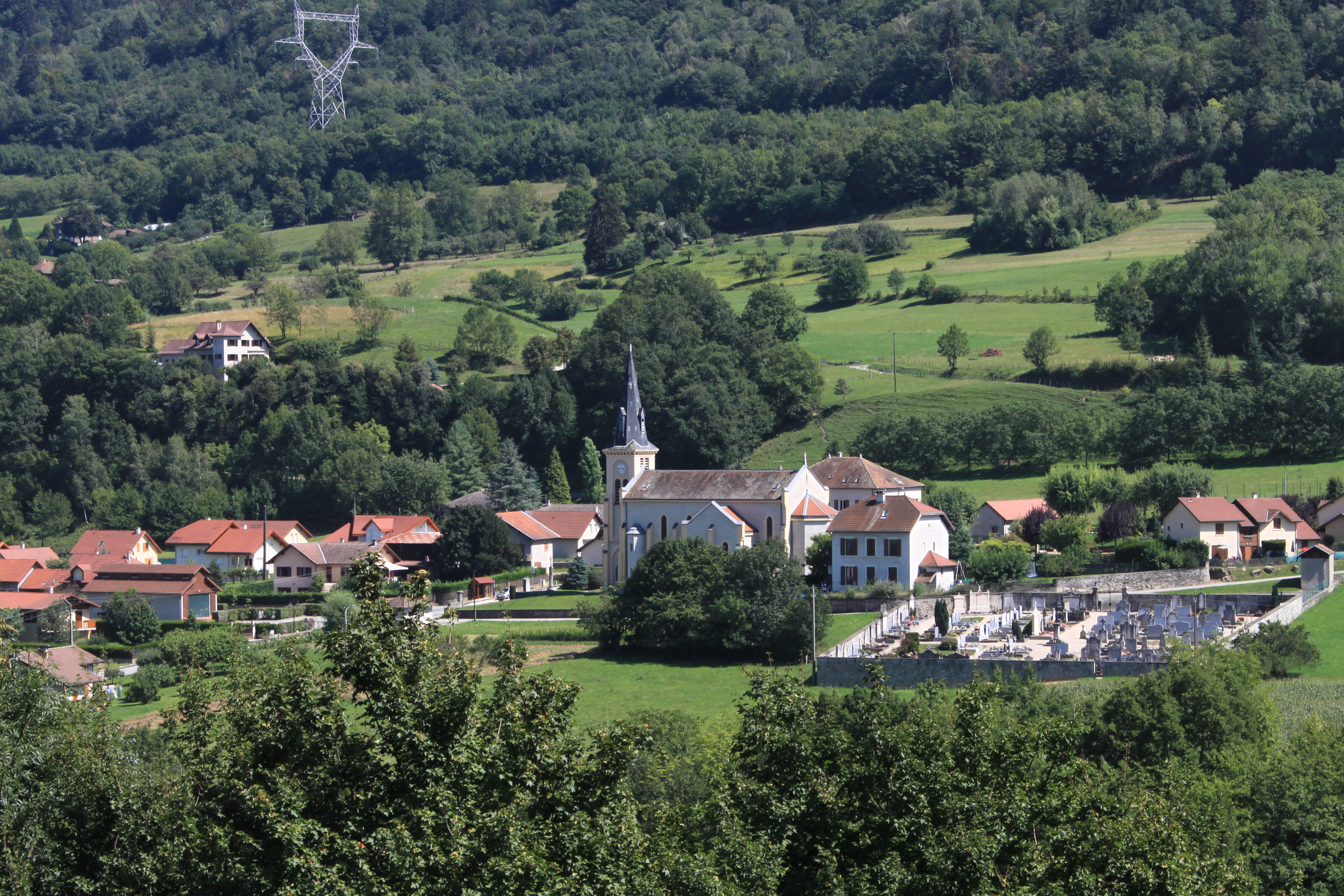
- A general view of Saint-Maximin
- Location of Saint-Maximin
- Location within France Location within Auvergne-Rhône-Alpes
- Coordinates: 45°25′12″N 6°01′58″E
- Country: France
- Region: Auvergne-Rhône-Alpes
- Department: Isère
- Arrondissement: Grenoble
- Canton: Le Haut-Grésivaudan
- Intercommunality: CC Le Grésivaudan

Government
  - Mayor (2020–2026): Olivier Roziau
- Area^{1}: 10.35 km^{2} (4.00 sq mi)
- Highest elevation: 1,204 m (3,950 ft)
- Lowest elevation: 274 m (899 ft)
- Population (2023): 689
  - Density: 66.6/km^{2} (172/sq mi)
- Time zone: UTC+01:00 (CET)
  - Summer (DST): UTC+02:00 (CEST)
- INSEE/Postal code: 38426 /38530
- ^{1} French Land Register data, which excludes lakes, ponds, glaciers > 1 km^{2} (0.386 sq mi or 247 acres) and river estuaries.

Saint-Maximin (French pronunciation: [sɛ̃ maksimɛ̃]) is a commune in the Isère department in southeastern France.

== Population ==
Historical population
Year	Pop.	±% p.a.
1968	384	—
1975	400	+0.58%
1982	432	+1.11%
1990	476	+1.22%
1999	539	+1.39%
2007	610	+1.56%
2012	639	+0.93%
2017	654	+0.47%
2023	689	+0.87%
Source: INSEE

== See also ==
- Communes of the Isère department
