= Church of St George, Letchworth =

Church in Hertfordshire, England

Coordinates: 51°59′13″N 0°13′18″W

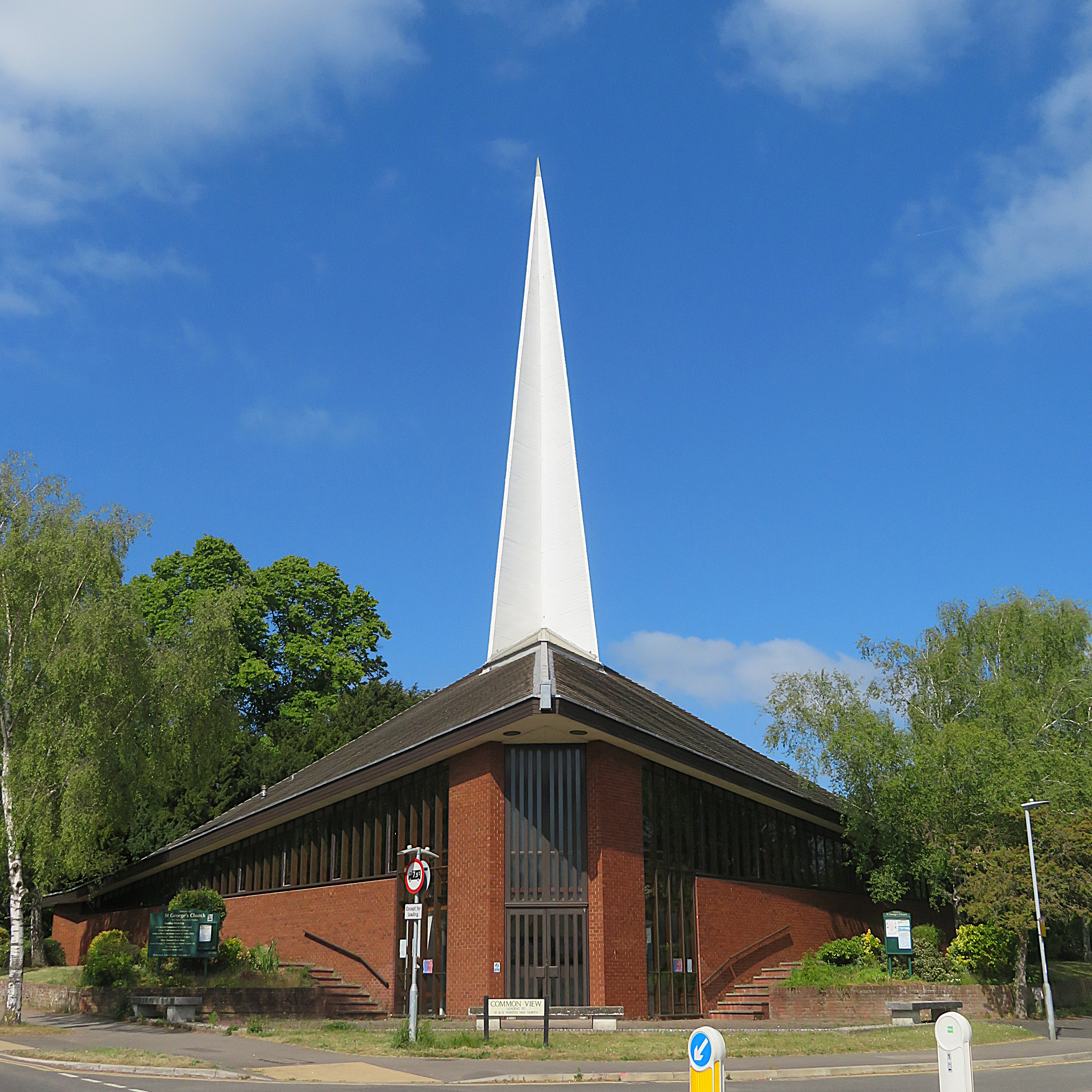
St George's Church

St George's Church is an Anglican church of modern design in the Parish of Norton in Letchworth Garden City in Hertfordshire. The building was completed in 1964. It has an arrow-shaped plan and a 120-foot concrete spire. The congregation is seated in a semi-circle facing the altar. The church building is in the style of the Liturgical Movement following World War II. It was Grade II listed in 2015 for "its striking architectural form, expressed through a diverse range of materials to provide an innovative building of real quality both in composition and detailing."

== History ==
For about 850 years the parish church for the village of Norton was the Church of St Nicholas, but as more and more houses were built in the area and Norton gradually became a suburb of Letchworth the need for a larger church in the area became apparent and a design for a large Gothic style church and hall were put forward. However, only the hall was built, opening in 1915 and being used for worship for about 50 years. After World War II the nearby Grange Estate was built and the need for a new church became even more pressing. From 1955 to the early 1960s local people regularly contributed towards the cost of building a new church.

== Design ==
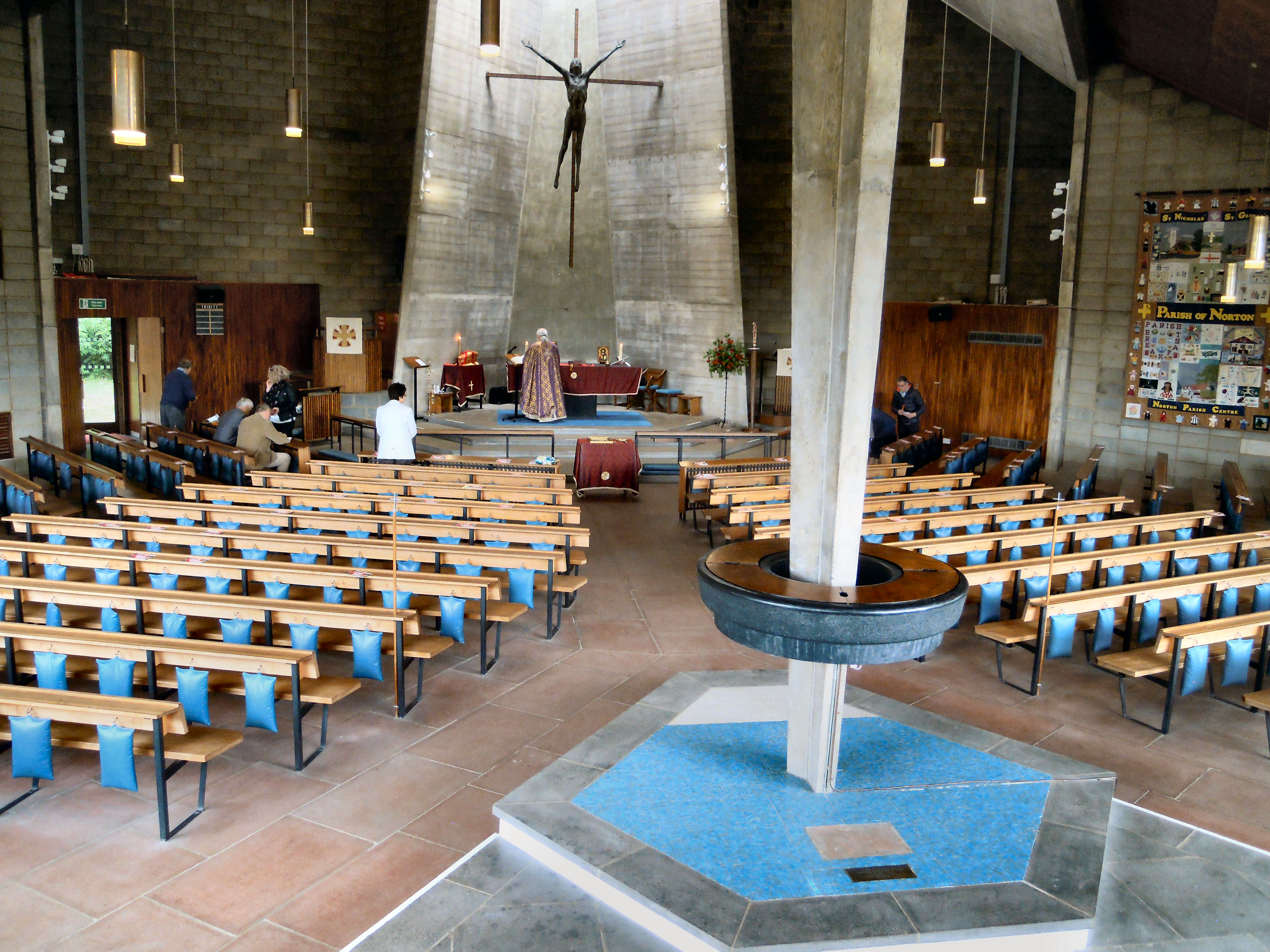
Interior of the church showing the circular concrete font

St George's church was built to the design of the architect Peter Bosanquet (1918–2005) of Brett, Boyd and Bosanquet architects. Bosanquet also designed much of the church's furniture and fittings, including the pews, which were crafted from African utile wood. The church is considered to be Bosanquet's "most innovative and successful design." In addition, he designed the churchwardens’ wands, all the candle holders and stands and the hymn board, which were made at the nearby Norton School. The fibreglass sculpture of Christ suspended over the altar was designed by the sculptor Harry R Phillips (1911–1976) and was intended to represent the Resurrection and the Ascension.

Building work on the triangular piece of land began in August 1962 with the firm of J T Openshaw Ltd of Letchworth as the main contractors; the final cost was £46,000. The foundation stone was laid by John Trillo, the Bishop of Bedford on 27 April 1963, with the church being consecrated on 27 July 1964 by Michael Gresford Jones, Bishop of St Albans.

The church "is unconventional in its form, with an arrow-shaped plan and fan-shaped seating arrangement focusing on a forward altar and communion rail at the north-east end" which enables the entire congregation to have an uninterrupted view. The use of unadorned concrete and natural wood were intended as a reminder of the simplicity and poverty of the life of Christ. The circular black concrete font is placed around the only pillar in the church, to symbolise that as the pillar physically supports the church so does baptism support the Church.

Nikolaus Pevsner wrote of the church:

"An ingenious and impressive design, well fitted to its corner site. The large sweeping roof continues the vernacular spirit of the early houses. Only the exterior textures are a little disappointing. Particularly notable is the integration of structure and fittings. The tall concrete spire, formed of two sides of a triangle, shelters a roof light, and penetrates through the roof to serve as a backdrop for altar and crucifix. The roof is supported at the w(est) end by a concrete pier, around which is the font, like a large shaft ring. The w(est) entrance is neatly contrived beneath the organ gallery."

Set into the mosaic floor beneath the font is a Roman tile from St Albans Cathedral to mark the connection between the cathedral and the parish church.

== Gallery ==
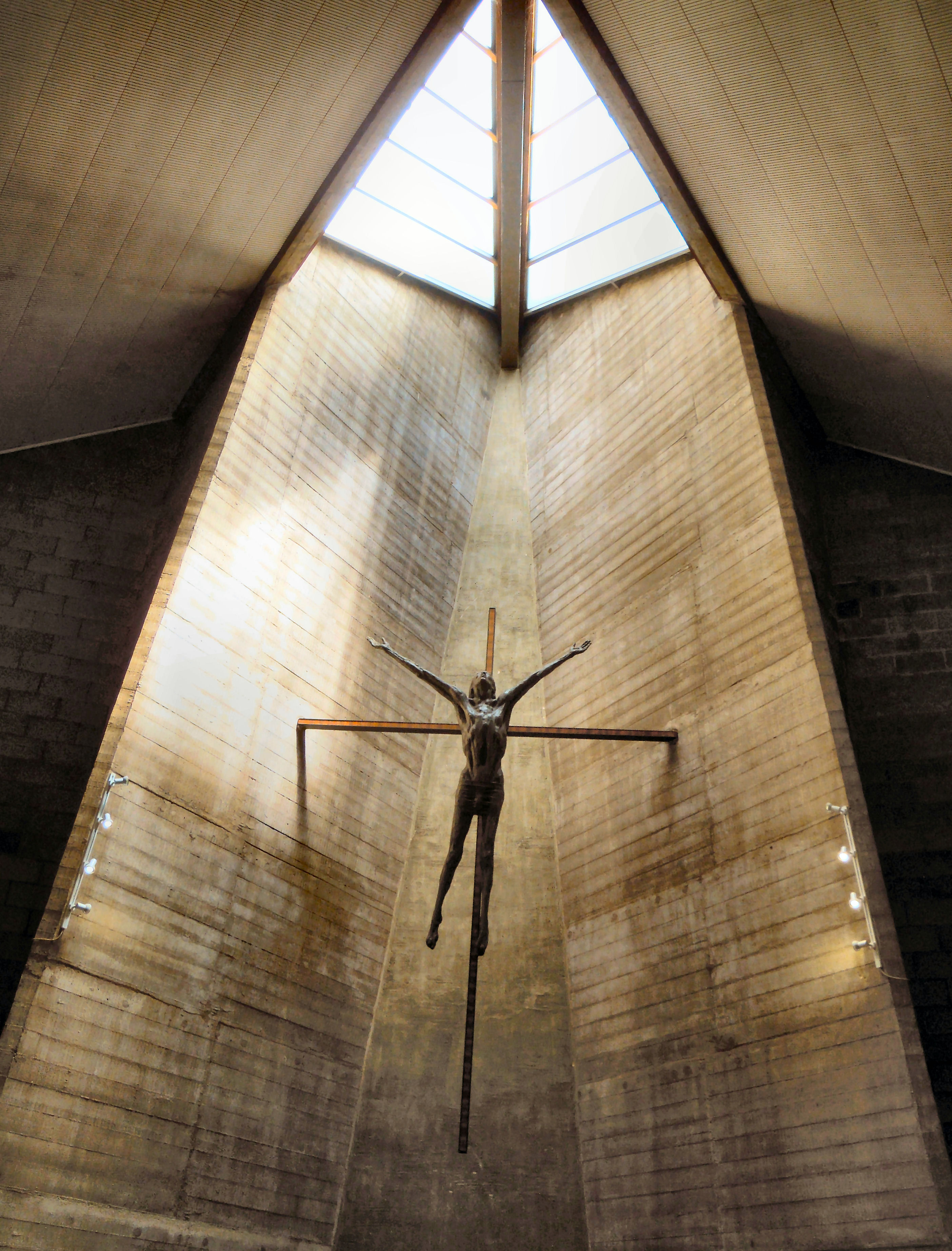
Statue of the Risen Christ above the altar

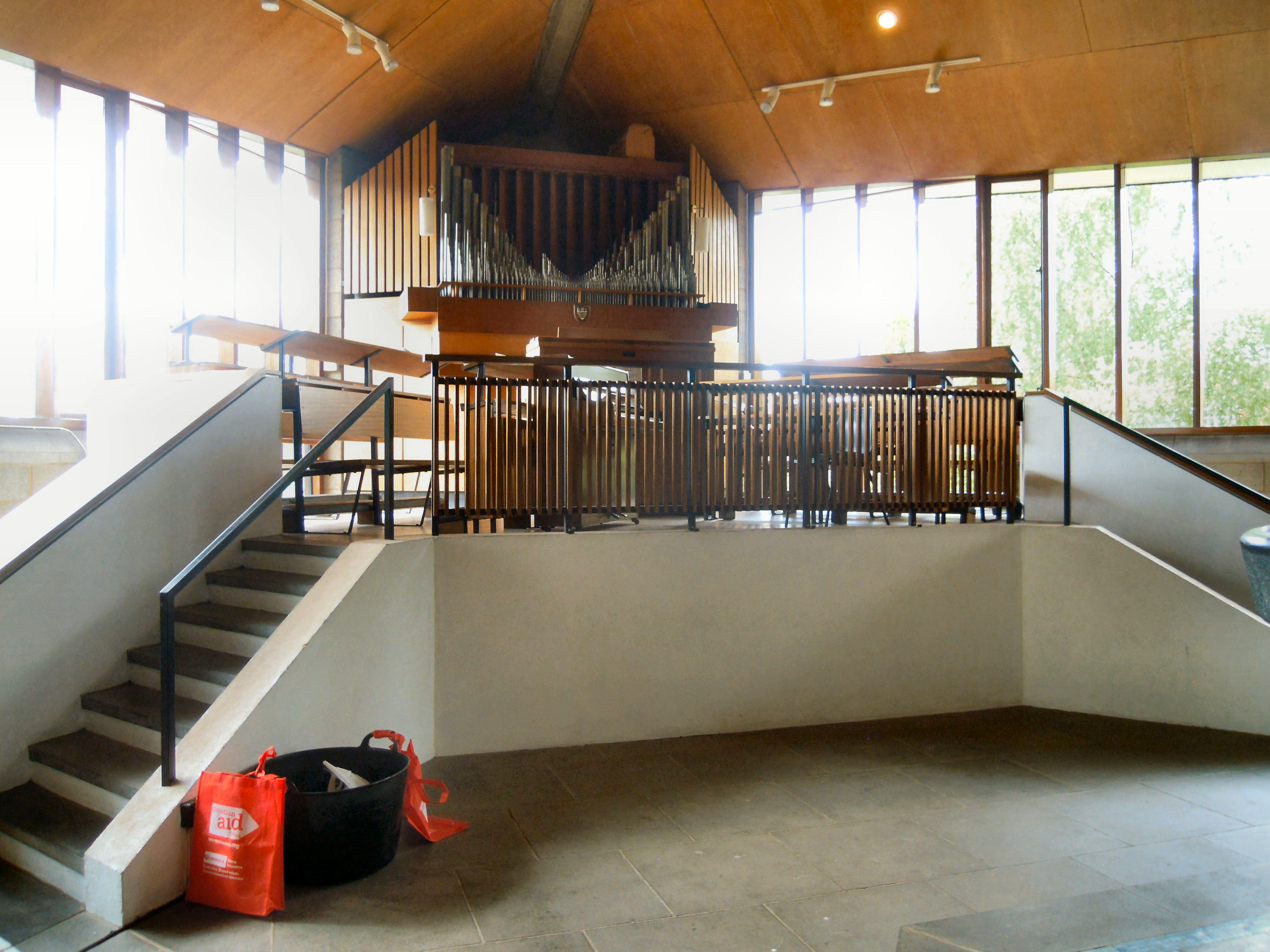
The organ and choir

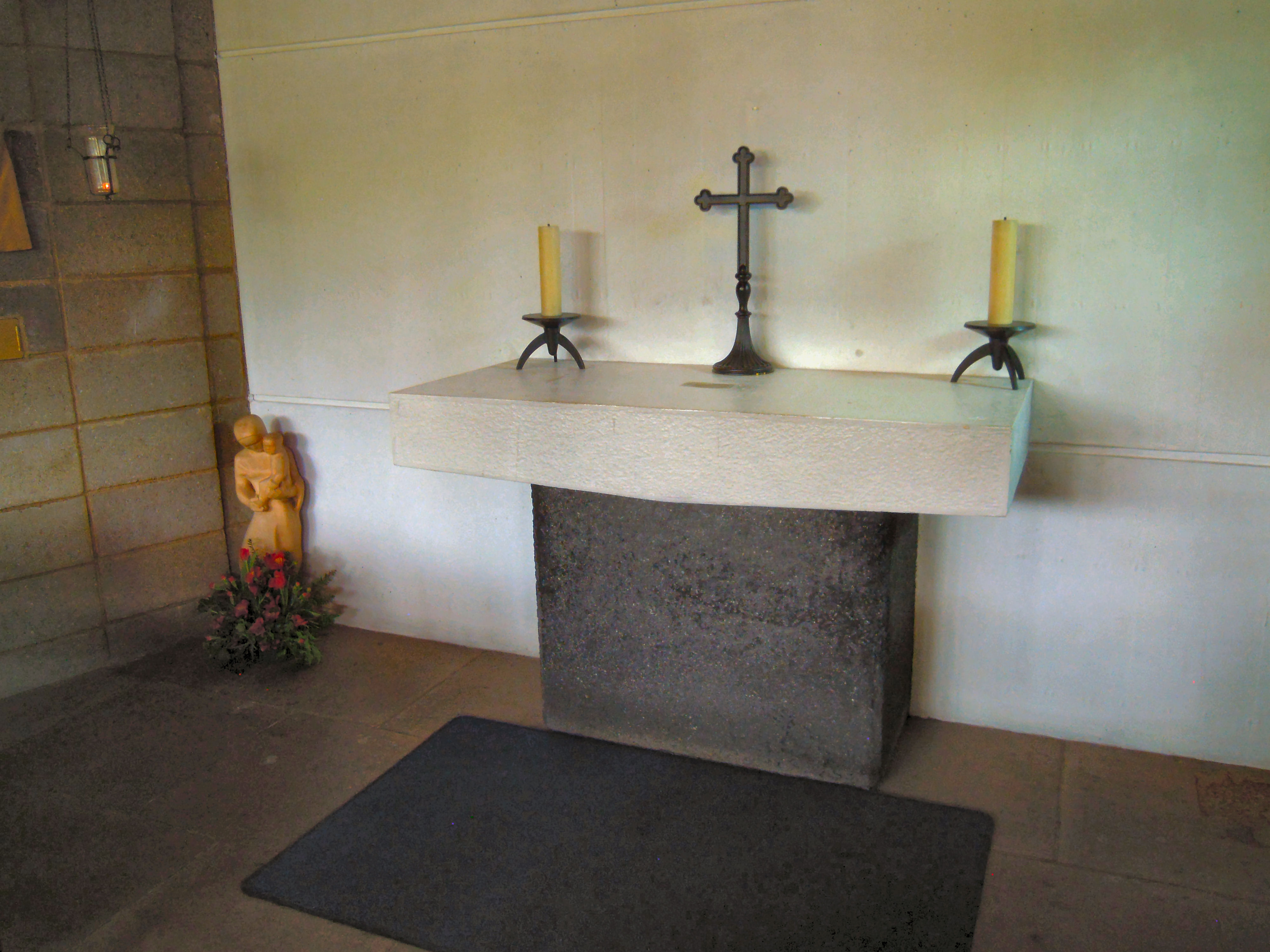
The Lady Chapel

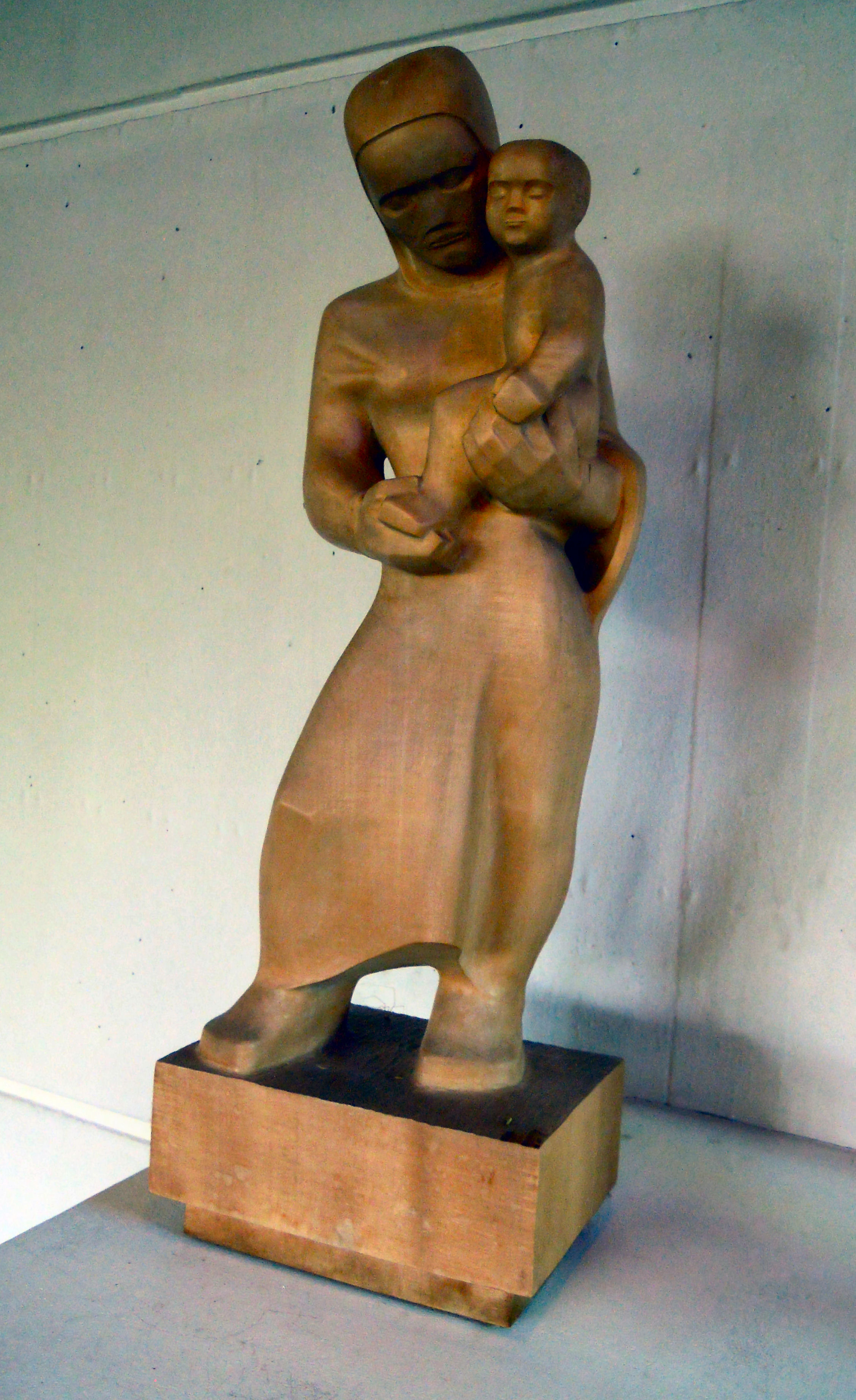
The wooden Madonna and Child

== Sources ==
- Lever, J., Powers, A., Stamp, G., Twentieth Century Architecture 3 - The Twentieth Century Church, (1998)
- Pevsner, N, Cherry, B, The Buildings of England: Hertfordshire, (1977), pg. 43
- Giles, Deborah, St George’s Church, Parish of Norton, Letchworth Garden City, (2003)
- Tompkins, Susan, Visiting an Anglican Church, Lutterworth Educational, (1981)
