= Norton, Hertfordshire =

Village in Hertfordshire, England

Coordinates: 51°59′37″N 0°12′46″W

Norton
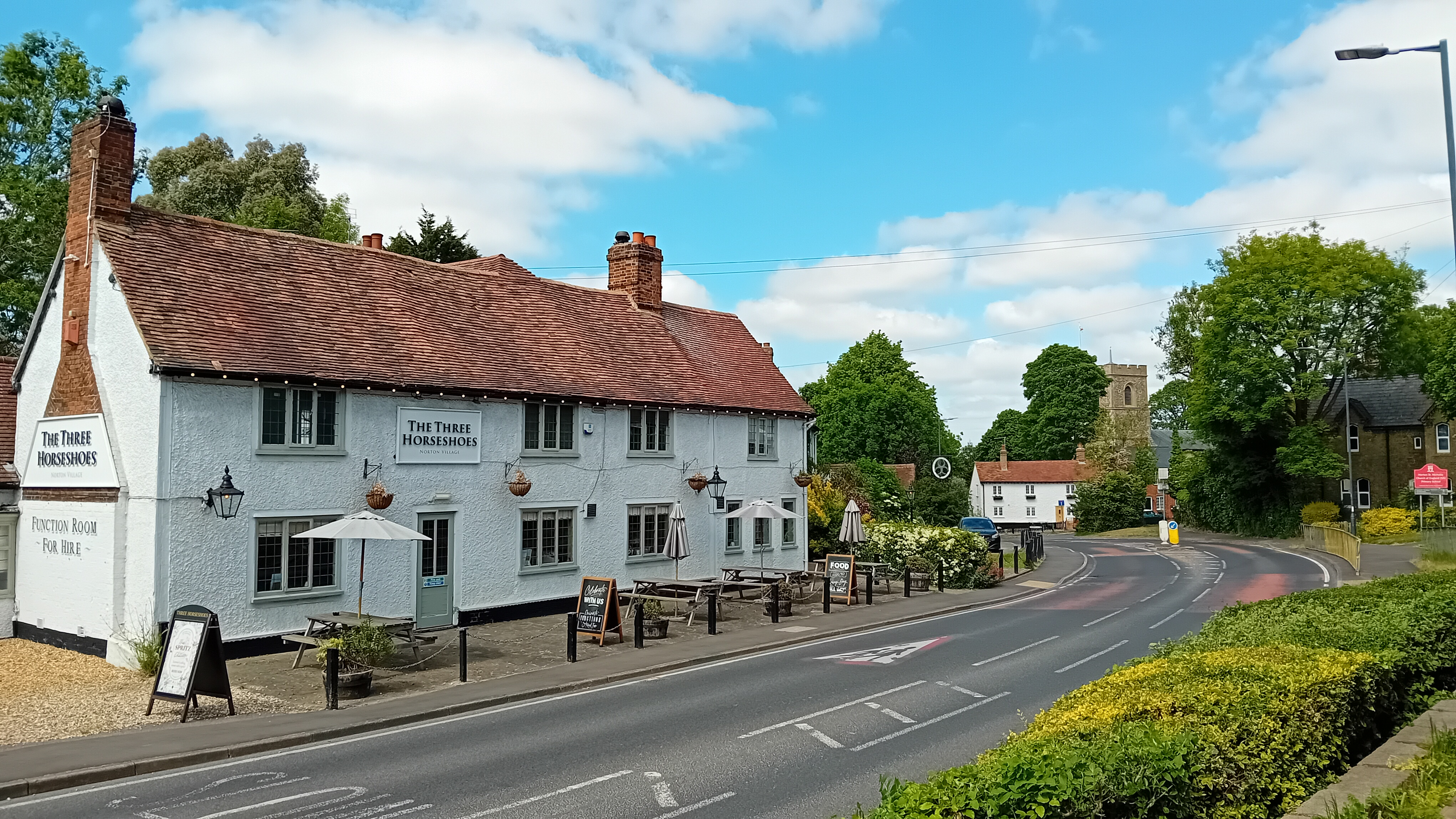
- Three Horseshoes and Norton village

- Location within Hertfordshire
- District: North Hertfordshire
- Shire county: Hertfordshire
- Region: East
- Country: England
- Sovereign state: United Kingdom
- Post town: LETCHWORTH GARDEN CITY
- Postcode district: SG6
- Dialling code: 01462
- Police: Hertfordshire
- Fire: Hertfordshire
- Ambulance: East of England
- UK Parliament: North East Hertfordshire

Norton is a small village adjoining the north-eastern edge of Letchworth, in the North Hertfordshire district, in the county of Hertfordshire, England. Along with Willian and Old Letchworth, it is one of the original three villages around which the garden city of Letchworth was created. The village is known to have existed by 1007, with remains of the medieval settlement visible as earthworks in a field beside the church. However, the history of the village goes back even further than that.

== History of Norton ==
Archaeological excavations in Norton have revealed evidence of human activity in the area going back to before around 3000 BC. People lived at different sites in the village during the Neolithic, Bronze and Iron Age, with continuity into the Roman period. Anglo-Saxon occupation is evident from a small cemetery discovered at Blackhorse Road in 1957 and a settlement discovered at Kristiansand Way in 1989, thought to be the lost site of Rodenhanger. It was during this latter period that the first written evidence about Norton appeared. A charter relating to Norton dating from AD 1007 is the earliest document to survive, recording its donation to the Abbey of St Albans and claiming that it had originally been given by Offa, King of Mercia, in the eighth century, together with Rodenhanger, a lost site said to lie together with Norton. The manor appeared in the Domesday Book of 1086, when it was listed among the lands belonging to the Abbots of St Albans. The records of the manorial courts, which date from AD 1244, give an extensive overview of the life of Norton's villagers during the medieval period. Following the Dissolution of St Albans Abbey in 1539 the manor of Norton passed into private hands, but its manorial courts continued to record the activities of its villagers until 1916.

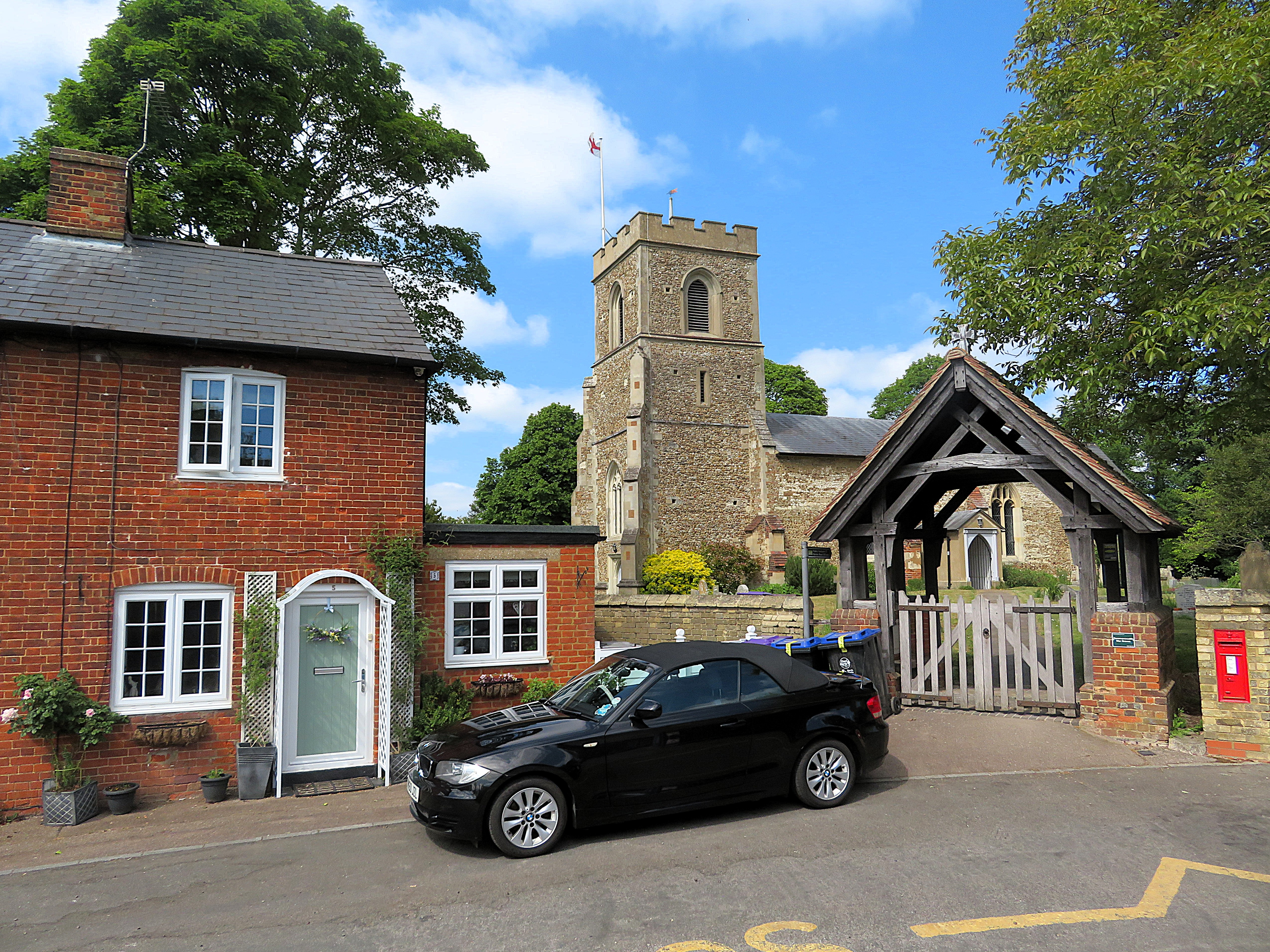
Church of St Nicholas

The village church, the Church of St Nicholas, dating back to the early twelfth century, is dedicated to St Nicholas, and has eight light bells hung for change ringing. Since the construction in the same parish of the much larger St George's church, in the town, St Nicholas' is in use as a chapel of ease.

== Governance ==
Norton was an ancient parish in the hundred of Cashio.

The parish of Norton was included in the Hitchin Poor Law Union from 1835. The south-eastern part of the parish of Norton extended to the edge of the town of Baldock, and in 1880 the Baldock Local Board was given control of the parts of Norton parish where the town's urban area was starting to expand into Norton. The following year the parish boundary between Norton and Baldock was adjusted to match the local board boundary.

Under the Local Government Act 1894, the parish of Norton became part of the Hitchin Rural District. Following the commencement of work on Letchworth Garden City in 1903, it became necessary to review administrative arrangements in the area. The civil parish of Letchworth was substantially enlarged on 1 April 1908 to take over all of Norton parish, which was abolished, and the northern part of Willian parish. At the date of the 1901 national census, the last prior to the parish's abolition, Norton had a population of 169. Since 1 April 1908, Norton has been administered as part of Letchworth, which became an urban district in 1919, and part of North Hertfordshire in 1974.

== 'Gypsy' Smith ==
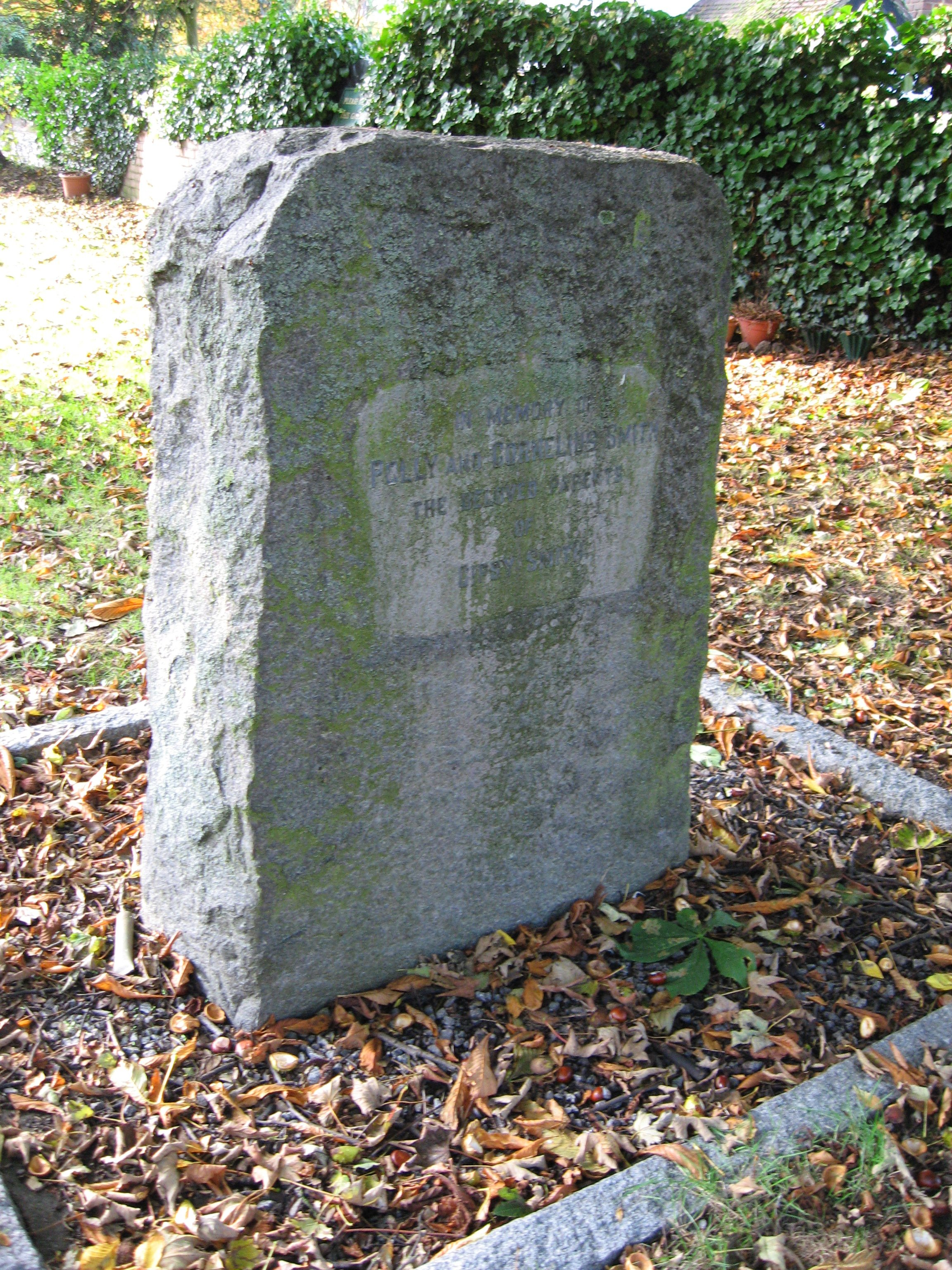
The grave of Polly and Cornelius Smith in St Nicholas churchyard in Norton

Polly and Cornelius Smith, the parents of Rodney "Gypsy" Smith, the international evangelist, are buried in the churchyard at Norton, Polly having died from smallpox in 1865 while the family was passing through the parish. Cornelius Smith was also a well-known evangelist, often preaching the Gospel with his two brothers. 'Gypsy' Smith maintained contact with Norton, visiting his parents grave as often as he could. In 1934, the Letchworth Methodist Circuit decided that a new church was needed in Norton Village. It was thought appropriate to dedicate the new building in memory of 'Gypsy' Smith's parents, and Smith raised a large sum of money for the building himself, with donations being sent from the UK and the United States.

The new chapel was opened by Smith's daughter Zillah and her husband Mr J T Lean in 1934 as Norton Methodist Mission, and it was given a distinctive caravan-shaped pulpit. Later, 'Gypsy' Smith and his brother Ezekiel conducted evangelical meetings at the church, one of the rare occasions when the two brothers appeared on the same platform. The building is still in use today as the North Avenue Methodist Church.

== Schools ==
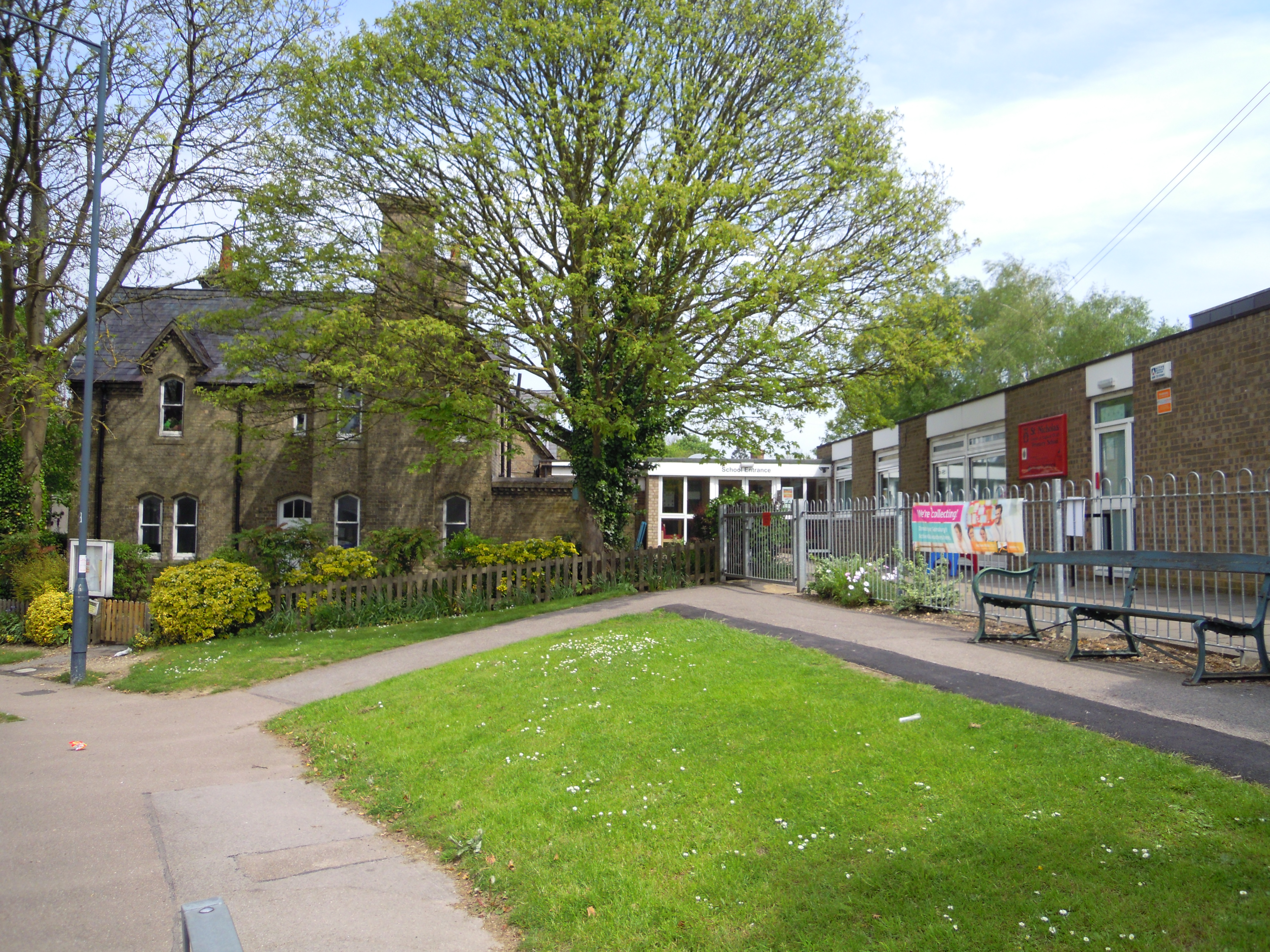
Norton St Nicholas School

The village's primary school, named after the church, was founded in 1873. A nearby secondary school, Norton School, founded in 1906, served the village and the area around it but was closed in 2002 with the school and its playing fields being developed for housing.
