= Charles Raison =

American psychiatrist and academic (born 1957)

- Born: December 26, 1957 (age 68); Dinuba, California, United States
- Education: Stanford (1976–80); University of Denver (1982–85); Bryn Mawr College (1985–86); Washington University in St. Louis (1987–91) (M.D.)
- Occupations: Psychiatrist, Researcher, Professor, Mental Health Expert for CNN.com
- Known for: Novel research in emotional and physical conditions related to stress and major depression

Charles L. Raison (born December 26, 1957) is an American psychiatrist and professor of psychiatry at the School of Medicine and Public Health (University of Wisconsin–Madison) as well as the Mary Sue and Mike Shannon Chair for Healthy Minds, Children & Families and Professor with the School of Human Ecology (University of Wisconsin–Madison).

Prior to this Raison was a professor in the Department of Psychiatry, College of Medicine, and the Barry and Janet Lang Professor of Integrative Mental Health at the Norton School of Family and Consumer Sciences, College of Agriculture and Life Sciences, at the University of Arizona. In addition to his academic positions, he serves as the founding Director of the Center for Compassion Studies in the College of Social and Behavioral Sciences at the University of Arizona and is the Director for Clinical and Translational Research for the Usona Institute, as well as the mental health expert for CNN.com.

== Early life and education ==
Raison has an undergraduate degree in anthropology from Stanford University and a Master's degree in English literature from the University of Denver. He received his medical degree from Washington University School of Medicine and did his residency training in psychiatry at the Semel Institute for Neuroscience and Human Behavior at UCLA, where he later served as Director of Emergency Psychiatry Services.

=== Education ===
- Undergraduate: 1976–80 Stanford University, Stanford, CA, B.A. in Anthropology with honors and departmental distinction
- Graduate: 1982–85 University of Denver, Denver, CO, M.A. in English, with emphasis in creative writing
- PreMedical: 1985–86 Bryn Mawr College, Bryn Mawr, PA, Premedical Program, Post Baccalaureate
- Medical: 1987–91 Washington University School of Medicine, St. Louis, MO, M.D. degree

==== Post-graduate training ====
- 1991–1992: Internship, Department of Psychiatry and Biobehavioral Sciences, UCLA Neuropsychiatric Institute and Hospital, Los Angeles, CA
- 1992–1995: Psychiatric Residency, Department of Psychiatry and Biobehavioral Sciences, UCLA Neuropsychiatric Institute and Hospital, Los Angeles, CA
- 1994–1995: Chief Resident, Adult Inpatient Services, Department of Psychiatry and Biobehavioral Sciences, UCLA Neuropsychiatric Institute and Hospital, Los Angeles, CA

== Awards and honors ==
- 2014: Principal Guest Scientist, 31st Midwest Symposium on Family Systems Theory and Therapy
- 2014: Invited to give Bench-to-Bedside Keynote Address at the International Behavioral Neuroscience Society (IBNS) meeting
- 2014: Raymond Pearl Award for “contributions to our understanding of evolutionary biocultural origins of mental health and illness”, Human Biology Association
- 2013: NARSAD Independent Investigator Award (Brain & Behavior Research Society)
- 2012: Chairman of the U.S. Psychiatric and Mental Health Congress
- 2011: Champion of Hope Award from the Africa's Children's Fund
- 2011: Distinguished Visiting Professorship, Brooke Army Medical Center, San Antonio, TX
- 2011: Invited Member, Emory University Public Scholars Seminar
- 2011: Chairman of the U.S. Psychiatric and Mental Health Congress
- 2009: Senior Fellow of the Mind & Life Institute
- 2009–10: Who's Who in Medicine and Healthcare
- 2009: American Psychiatric Association Ninth Annual Research Colloquium for Junior Investigators, Invited Faculty Member
- 2008: Semi-finalist presidential search for Naropa University, Boulder, CO
- 2006: Emory College Seed Fund Award to Improve the Research Profile of the Arts and Sciences
- 2006: Future Leaders in Psychiatry Travel Award
- 2005: Emory College Seed Fund Award to Improve the Research Profile of the Arts and Sciences
- 2005: Emory University Teaching Fund Award to develop interdisciplinary course entitled Phenomenology of Depression: Body, Mind and Culture
- 2005: Who's Who in Medical Sciences Education
- 2004: National Institutes of Health Extramural Loan Repayment Program Award
- 2004: American Psychiatric Association Ninth Annual Research Colloquium for Junior Investigators, Invited Member
- 2003: Emory University Medical Students' Teaching Award for Psychiatry
- 2002: National Institutes of Health Extramural Loan Repayment Program Award
- 2002: American Psychiatric Association Seventh Annual Research Colloquium for Junior Investigators, Invited Member
- 2002–06: K23 Mentored Patient-Oriented Research Career Development Award, National Institute of Mental Health
- 2001: Bristol Meyers Squibb Young Faculty Development Award
- 2001: Emory University Psychiatry Senior Residents' Outstanding Educator Award
- 2000: Emory University Teaching Fund Award for the development of an interdisciplinary course entitled Psychobiological Foundations of Personhood: Tibetan Buddhist and Western Perspectives
- 2000: Emory Medical Care Foundation Research Award
- 2000: Future Leaders in Psychiatry Travel Award
- 1998: Balm Foundation Research Grant
- 1993: American Psychoanalytic Association Fellow
- 1991: Alpha Omega Alpha, Washington University chapter
- 1991: Missouri State Medical Association Award
- 1984: Colorado State Fellow, University of Denver

== Publications ==
=== Scientific articles published in peer-reviewed journals ===
- Raison, C.L.; Miller, A.H. (2013). "The Evolutionary Significance of Depression in Pathogen Host Defense (PATHOS-D)". Molecular Psychiatry. 18 (1): 15–37. doi:10.1038/mp.2012.2. PMC 3532038. PMID 22290120.
- Reddy, S.D.; Negi, L.T.; Dodson-Lavelle, B.; Ozawa; Silva, B.; Pace, T.W.; Cole, S.P.; Raison, C.L.; Craighead, L.W. (2012). "Cognitively-Based Compassion Training: a promising prevention strategy for at-risk adolescents". Journal of Child and Family Studies.
- Rook, G.A.W.; Raison, C.L.; Lowry, C.A. (2012). "Can we vaccinate against depression". Drug Discovery Today. 17 (9–10): 451–458. doi:10.1016/j.drudis.2012.03.018. PMID 22507593.
- Johnson, T.V.; Abbasi, A.; Ehrich, S.S.; Kleris, R.S.; Owen-Smith, A.; Raison, C.L. Master (2012). "IPSS quality of life question: a possible indicator of depression among patients with lower urinary tract symptoms". Canadian Journal of Urology. 19 (1): 6100–6104. PMID 22316511.
- McNutt, Marcia D.; Liu, Shuling; Manatunga, Amita; Royster, Erica B.; Raison, Charles L.; Woolwine, Bobbi J.; Demetrashvili, Marina F.; Miller, Andrew H.; Musselman, Dominique L. (2012-05-01). "Neurobehavioral effects of interferon-α in patients with hepatitis-C: symptom dimensions and responsiveness to paroxetine". Neuropsychopharmacology. 37 (6): 1444–1454. doi:10.1038/npp.2011.330. ISSN 1740-634X. PMC 3327849. PMID 22353759.
- Pace, T.W.; Negi, L.T.; Dodson-Lavelle, B.; Ozawa-de Silva, B. Reddy; Cole, S.P.; Danes, A.; Craighead, L.W.; Raison, C.L. (2012). "Engagement with Cognitively-Based Compassion Training is associated with reduced salivary C-reactive protein from before to after training in foster care program adolescents". Psychoneuroendocrinology. 38 (2): 294–299. doi:10.1016/j.psyneuen.2012.05.019. PMID 22762896. S2CID 22316844.
- Raison, C.L.; Haroon, E.; Woolwine, B.J.; Shuo, C.; Haber, M. Rutherford; Miller, A.H. (2012). "Safety and Efficacy of the Tumor Necrosis Factor-alpha antagonist, Infliximab, for Treatment Resistant Depression: A Double-Blind Randomized Clinical Trial". Archives of General Psychiatry. 70 (1): 31–41. doi:10.1001/2013.jamapsychiatry.4. PMC 4015348. PMID 22945416.
- Mascaro, J.S.; Rilling, J.K.; Negi, L.T.; Raison, C.L. (2012). "Compassion meditation enhances empathic accuracy and related neural activity". Social and Cognitive Neuroscience. 8 (1): 48–55. doi:10.1093/scan/nss095. PMC 3541495. PMID 22956676.
- Desbordes, G.; Negi, L.T.; Pace, T.W.; Wallace, B.A.; Raison, C.L.; Schwartz, E.L. (2012). "Effects of mindful-attention and compassion meditation training on amygdala response to emotional stimuli in an ordinary, non-meditative state". Frontiers in Neuroscience. 6: 292. doi:10.3389/fnhum.2012.00292. PMC 3485650. PMID 23125828.
- Hale, M.W.; Raison, C.L.; Lowry, C.A. (2012). "Integrative physiology of depression and antidepressant drug action: implications for serotonergic mechanisms of action and novel therapeutic strategies for treatment of depression". Pharmacology & Therapeutics. 137 (1): 108–18. doi:10.1016/j.pharmthera.2012.09.005. PMID 23017938.
- Felger, J.C.; Li, L.; Marvar, P.J.; Woolwine, B.J.; Harrison, D.G.; Raison, C.L.; Miller; Tyrosine Metabolism, During Interferon-alpha Administration (2012). "Association with Fatigue and CSF Dopamine Concentrations". Brain, Behavior, and Immunity. 31: 153–160. doi:10.1016/j.bbi.2012.10.010. PMC 3578984. PMID 23072726.
- Mascaro, Jennifer S.; Rilling, James K.; Negi, Lobsang Tenzin; Raison, Charles L. (2013-04-01). "Pre-existing brain function predicts subsequent practice of mindfulness and compassion meditation". NeuroImage. 69: 35–42. doi:10.1016/j.neuroimage.2012.12.021. ISSN 1095-9572. PMC 8751906. PMID 23266748. S2CID 27349666.
- Berg, Joanna M.; Lilienfeld, Scott O.; Reddy, Sheethal D.; Latzman, Robert D.; Roose, Annelore; Craighead, Linda W.; Pace, Thaddeus W. W.; Raison, Charles L. (2013-10-01). "The Inventory of Callous and Unemotional Traits: a construct-validational analysis in an at-risk sample". Assessment. 20 (5): 532–544. doi:10.1177/1073191112474338. ISSN 1552-3489. PMID 23344913. S2CID 39117323.
- Miller, A.H., Haroon, E., Raison, C.L., Felger, J.C. Cytokine Targets in the Brain: Impact on Neurotransmitters and Neurocircuits. Depression & Anxiety 2013; 30::297–306
- Rook, G.A.W.; Lowry, C.A.; Raison, C.L. (2013). "Microbial "Old Friends", immunoregulation and stress resilience". Evolution, Medicine, and Public Health. 2013 (1): 46–64. doi:10.1093/emph/eot004. PMC 3868387. PMID 24481186.
- Hanusch, K., Janssen, C.H., Billheimer, D, Jenkins, I., Spurgeon, E., Lowry, C.A., Raison, C.L. Whole Body Hyperthermia (WBH) for the Treatment of Major Depression: Associations with Thermoregulatory Cooling. American Journal of Psychiatry 2013; 170: 802–804.
- Mehta, D; Raison, CL; Woolwine, BJ; Haroon, E; Binder, EB; Miller, AH; Felger, JC (2013). "Transcriptional signatures related to glucose and lipid metabolism predict treatment response to the tumor necrosis factor antagonist infliximab in patients with treatment-resistant depression". Brain Behav Immun. 31: 205–215. doi:10.1016/j.bbi.2013.04.004. PMC 3673885. PMID 23624296.
- Rook, G.A.W.; Raison, C.L.; Lowry, C.A. (2014). "Microbial "Old Friends", immunoregulation and socio-economic status". Clinical and Experimental Immunology. 177 (1): 1–12. doi:10.1111/cei.12269. PMC 4089149. PMID 24401109.
- Whisman, M.A.; Li, A.; Sbarra, D.A.; Raison, C.L. (2014). "Marital functioning and diabetes: results from the health and retirement study". Health Psychology. 33 (8): 832–840. doi:10.1037/hea0000064. PMID 25068454.
- Raison, C.L. (2014). "Inflammatory depression: a trifecta of trouble". Journal of Clinical Psychiatry. 75 (6): 663–4. doi:10.4088/JCP.14ac09217. PMID 25004190.

=== Review articles and clinical guidelines ===
- Raison C.L., Nemeroff C.B. "Cancer and depression: prevalence, diagnosis and treatment. 2000. Home Health Consultant 7; 9: 34–41.
- Raison, C.L. "Managing neuropsychiatric side effects of peginterferon. The Treatment Reporter. November 2002 Edition. Projects in Knowledge publications.
- Demetrashvili, M., Raison, C.L., Miller, A.H. Depression in at-risk populations. CNS news. July 2002: 9–12.
- Raison, C.L. (2006). "The effects of hepatitis C and its treatment on mental health". Focus: A Guide to AIDS Research and Counseling. 21 (5): 5–6. PMID 16838424.
- Raison, C.L., Afdhal, N.H. Neuropsychiatric side effects associated with interferon-alfa plus ribavirin therapy: Recognition and risk factors. In: UpToDate, Rose, B.D. (Ed), UpToDate, Waltham, MA, 2006.
- Raison, C.L., Afdhal, N.H. Neuropsychiatric side effects associated with interferon-alfa plus ribavirin therapy: Treatment and prevention. In: UpToDate, Rose, B.D. (Ed), UpToDate, Waltham, MA, 2006.
- Miller, A.H.; Raison, C.L. (2008). "Immune System Contributions to the Pathophysiology of Depression". Focus: The Journal of Lifelong Learning in Psychiatry. 6: 36–45. doi:10.1176/foc.6.1.foc36.
- Maletic, V. & Raison, C.L. Immune disturbances in chronic pain: cause, consequence or both? Current Immunology Reviews, Accepted for publication
- Rook, G.A.W.; Raison, C.L.; Lowry, C.A. Microbes; Mood (2011). "a New Approach to the Therapy of Depression?". Microbiologist. 12 (3): 30–36.
- Rook, G.A.W., Raison, C.L., Lowry, C.A. Major Depressive Disorder, Immunoregulation, Inflammation and Our Changing Microbial Environment. www.brainimmune.com. Friday, 4 November 2011.
- Ozawa; Silva, B.; Dodson-Lavelle, B.; Raison, C.L.; Negi, L.T. Compassion (2012). "scientific and practical approaches to the cultivation of compassion as a foundation for ethical subjectivity and well-being". Journal of Healthcare, Science and the Humanities. 2: 145–165.
- Maletic, V. Raison (2012). "cause, consequence or both?". Current Immunology Reviews. 8: 76–86. doi:10.2174/157339512798991254.
- Rook, G.A.W., Raison, C.L., Lowry, C.A. Microbial “Old Friends”, immunoregulation and psychiatric disorders. Old Herborn University Seminar Monograph 2012
- Raison, C.L. & Miller, A.H. Do Cytokines Really Sing the Blues? Cerebrum: the online magazine that can change your mind. Dana Foundation, http://www.dana.org/news/cerebrum. August 2013
- Rook, G.A.W.; Lowry, C.A.; Raison, C.L. (2013). "Microbial "Old Friends", immunoregulation and socio-economic status". Clin Exp Immunol.

=== Books ===
- Maletic, V., Jain, R., Raison, C.L. 100 Questions and Answers about Pain. Jones and Bartlett Publishers, Inc. Sudbury, MA, 2010.
- Draud, J.W., Jain, R., Maletic, V, Raison, C.L. Treating the Whole Patient: Exploring the Healing Potential of a Mind-Body Approach to Mental Health. CME LLC, 2011
- Raison, C.L., Maletic, V. J. The New Mind-Body Science of Depression, W.W. Norton, New York, 2013

=== Book chapters ===
- Raison, C.L., Miller, A.H. Immune System and Central Nervous System Interactions. In: Kaplan & Sadock's Comprehensive Textbook of Psychiatry, 8th Edition. Eds: Sadock, B.J., Sadock, V.A. Philadelphia. Lippincott, Williams & Wilkins. 2005, pp. 137–161.
- Raison, C.L., Purselle, D.C., Capuron, L., Miller, A.H. Treatment of Depression in Medical Illness. In: Biology of Depression. Eds: Licinio, J. and Wong, M. 2005, pp. 253–278.
- Raison, C.L., Giese-Davis, J., Miller, A.H., Spiegel, D. Depression in Cancer: Mechanisms, Consequences and Treatment. In: The Physician's Guide to Depression and Bipolar Disorders. Eds: Evans, D.L., Charney, D.S., Lewis, L. 2006, pp. 377–409.
- Norris, E.R., Raison, C.L. Depression. In: Medical Management of the Surgical Patient: a Textbook of the Perioperative Patient. Eds: Lubin, M.F., Smith, R.B., Dobson, T.F., Spell, N., Walker, H.K. 2006, pp. 479–490.
- Raison, C.L., Miller, A.H. Immune System and Central Nervous System Interactions. In: Kaplan & Sadock's Comprehensive Textbook of Psychiatry, 9th Edition. Eds: Sadock, B.J., Sadock, V.A. Philadelphia. Lippincott, Williams & Wilkins. 2009, pp. 175–198.
- Owen-Smith, A.A., Raison, C.L. Complementary and Alternative Medicine. In: Clinical Manual of Prevention Principles in Mental Health Care. Ed: Compton, M. American Psychiatric Publishing, Inc, 2009, pp. 105–119.
- Thompson, D.S., Raison, C.L., Jonas, C., Miller, A.H. Cancer and Depression: Phenomenology and Pathophysiology. In: Internal Medicine Care of Cancer Patients. Eds: Gagel, R.F., Escalante, C.P., and Yeung S-C. In press.
- Nater, U., Heim, C.M., Raison, C.L. Chronic Fatigue Syndrome. In: vol: Neurobiology of Psychiatric Disorders. Eds: Schlaepfer, T.; series: Handbook of Clinical Neurology. Eds: Aminoff, M.J, Boller, F., Swabb, D.F., Elsevier, 2012.
- Miller, A.H., Pace, T.W.W., Raison, C.L. Neuropsychiatric effects of IFN-alpha: relevance to depression. In: Understanding Depression: A Translational Approach. Eds: Pariante, C.M., Nesse, R.M., Nutt, D., Wolpert, L. Oxford University Press, Oxford, UK, 2009, pp. 223–237.
- Nater, U., Raison, C.L., Miller, A.H., Reeves, W.C. Chronic Fatigue Syndrome. In: The Concise Corsini Encyclopedia of Psychology and Behavioral Science, 2nd Edition. Eds: Craighead WE and Nemeroff CB. John Wiley & Sons, Inc. Hoboken, NJ. 2004, pp. 177–180.
- Burke, M.A., Raison, C.L., Miller, A.H. Depression in cancer: pathophysiology at the mind-body interface. In: Cancer Symptom Science: Measurements, Mechanisms, and Management. Eds: Cleeland, C.S., Fisch, M.J., Dunn, A.J. Cambridge University Press, Cambridge UK, 2010, pp. 75–85.
- Pace, T.W.W., Raison, C.L., Miller, A.H. Role of inflammation in neuropsychiatric disorders. In: Inflammation, Life Style and Chronic Diseases: The Silent Link. Ed.: Aggarwal, B.B., 2011
- Raison, C.L., Mascaro, J.S., Pace, T.W. Research on the Endocrinology of Compassion. In: Compassion: From Theory to Training to Neuroscience. A Multimedia Book. Ed.: Singer, T.A., 2012
- Nater UM, Heim CM, Raison C, (2012). Chronic fatigue syndrome. In: Schlaepfer T, Nemeroff CB (Eds.), Neurobiology of Psychiatric Disorders. Handbook of Clinical Neurology, Vol 106. Elsevier, Amsterdam, pp. 573–587
- Raison, C.L., Miller, A.H. The Role of Inflammation in Depression: Implications for Phenomenology, Pathophysiology and Treatment. In: Leonard, B., Halaris, A. (Eds.) Modern Trends in Pharmacopsychiatry, Vol. 28, 2013; Karger Medical and Scientific Publishers, Basel, Switzerland
- Raison, C.L., Miller, A.H., Rook, G.A.W., Begay, T. "Role of Inflammation in Diseases of the Nervous System (Psychiatry)". In: Zigmond, M.J., Coyle, J.T., Rowland, L.P. (Eds.) Neurobiology of Brain Disorders. Elsevier, 2013
- Dodson-Lavelle, B., Ozawa-de Silva, B., Raison, C.L., and Negi, L.T. Healing Through Compassion: Cognitively-Based Compassion Training for Foster Care Youth. In: Rozelle, D., Rome, D. (Eds.) Contemplative Methods in Trauma Treatment: Integrating Mindfulness and Other Approaches. Guilford Press, 2014
- Shah, N. & Raison, C.L. Depression and the surgical patient. In: Lubin, M.F., Dodson, T.F., Winawer, N. (Eds.) Medical Management of the Surgical Patient: a Textbook of Perioperative Medicine, Cambridge University Press, 2013
- Shah, N. & Raison, C.L. Psychological and emotional reactions to illness and surgery. In: Lubin, M.F., Dodson, T.F., Winawer, N. (Eds.) Medical Management of the Surgical Patient: a Textbook of Perioperative Medicine, Cambridge University Press, 2013
- Rook, G.A.W., Lowry, C.A., Raison, C.L. Microbiota and the hygiene hypothesis of psychiatric disorders. In: Cryan, J.., Lyte, M. (Eds.) The Microbiota-Gut-Brain Axis in Health and Disease, Springer, 2013

=== Commentaries and editorials ===
- Miller, A.H., Raison, C.L. Cytokines, p. 38 MAP Kinase and the Pathophysiology of Depression. Neuropsychopharmacology 2006. 31: 2089–2090.
- Raison, C.L. Buddhists Meet Mind Scientists in Conference on Meditation and Depression. Psychiatric Times, 25(3), May 2008
- Raison, C.L. An Evolutionary View on the Anti-Inflammatory Potential of Compassion. Annals of the New York Academy of Sciences Winter 2009:
- Raison, C.L., Maletic, V., Jain, R., Draud, J. From Chaos to Consilience Parts I–III. Psychiatric Times, May–August 2009
- Rook, G.A.W., Raison, C.L., Lowry, C.A. Childhood microbial experience, immunoregulation, inflammation and adult susceptibility to psychosocial stressors and depression in rich and poor countries. Evolution, Medicine, and Public Health 2012; Epub
- Raison, C.L. & Miller A.H. Malaise, melancholia and madness: The evolutionary legacy of an inflammatory biasRaison, CL; Miller, AH (2013). "Malaise, melancholia and madness: the evolutionary legacy of an inflammatory bias". Brain Behav. Immun. 31: 1–8. doi:10.1016/j.bbi.2013.04.009. PMC 3678371. PMID 23639523.
