= Gipsy Smith =

British evangelist (1860-1947)

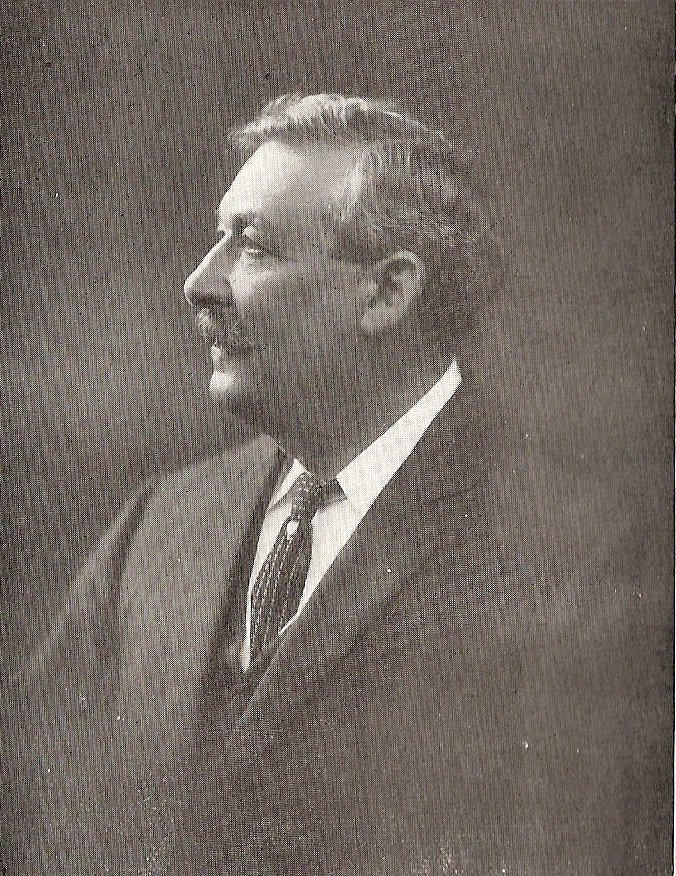

Personal life
- Born: 31 March 1860 Epping Forest, London, England
- Died: 4 August 1947 (aged 87) Atlantic Ocean

Religious life
- Religion: Christianity

Rodney "Gipsy" Smith MBE (31 March 1860 – 4 August 1947) was a British evangelist who conducted evangelistic campaigns in the United States and Great Britain for over 70 years. He was an early member of The Salvation Army and a contemporary of Fanny Crosby and acquaintance of G. Campbell Morgan and H. A. Ironside.

== Early life ==
The monument in Epping Forest marking the site of Smith's birth

Smith was born in a Romani bender tent in Epping Forest, six miles northeast of London. Today the site is marked with a large, commemorative stone in the woods near Waterworks Corner, Woodford Green. Smith received no education, and his family made a living selling baskets, tinware, and clothespegs. His father, Cornelius (1831–1922), and his mother, Mary (Polly) Welch (c1831-1865), provided a home that was happy in their vardo. Smith was a child when his mother died from smallpox near Baldock in Hertfordshire. She is buried in the nearby churchyard of St Nicholas church in Norton, now part of Letchworth Garden City. Cornelius Smith was later buried with her. The Smith children numbered four girls and two boys (Rodney was the fourth child).

Cornelius Smith was in and out of jail for various offences. There, he heard the gospel from a prison chaplain; later, he and his brothers were converted at a mission meeting. From 1873 on, "The Converted Gypsies" were involved in numerous evangelistic efforts.

== Conversion ==
Aged 16, Smith's conversion came as a result of a combination of various factors; the witness of his father, hearing Ira Sankey sing and a visit to the home of John Bunyan in Bedford all contributed. He taught himself to read and write and began to practice preaching. He would sing hymns to the people he met and was known as "the singing gypsy boy."

At a convention at the Christian Mission (later to become The Salvation Army) headquarters in London, William Booth noticed the Gypsies and realized the potential in young Smith. On 25 June 1877 Smith accepted the invitation of Booth to be an evangelist with and for the Mission. For six years (1877–1882) he served on street corners and mission halls.

== Family ==
He was married on 17 December 1879 to Annie E. Pennock, one of his converts. It was from this marriage that Rodney and Annie had three children, two boys and one girl. Albany Rodney, the eldest, became a Christian later in life and eventually followed in his father's footsteps and became an evangelist in the United States. Albany was known as 'Gipsy Smith, Jr.' and served as an evangelist from 1911 to his death on August 24, 1951. Albany's three children were Betty, John (Jack) Rodney, a lawyer, and George Wilbur, a Presbyterian pastor of three churches, one in Missouri, one in Stuttgart, Arkansas and one at Batesville, Mississippi. Rodney's youngest son, Alfred Hanley, became a Christian at a young age and became a Wesleyan pastor in England and served at 11 different pastorates during his 43 years in the ministry. Hanley died on February 11, 1949, at the age of 67.

Rhoda Zillah served with her father in his great South African campaign known as the "Mission of Peace". She eventually married a banker named James Lean and had two children, Rodney James Lean and Zillah Lean. Zillah Elizabeth Lean, Gipsy's granddaughter, worked with the late English author David Lazell, of East Leake, in his first biographical account of Gipsy Smith entitled, "Gipsy Smith, From the Forest I Came". Also, Lieutenant Charles Smith, of El Dorado, Arkansas wrote a brief biographical account of the Gipsy Smith family for the British Evangelical Magazine, The Flame (July–September 2006: Volume 72 No. 3).

== Salvation Army ==
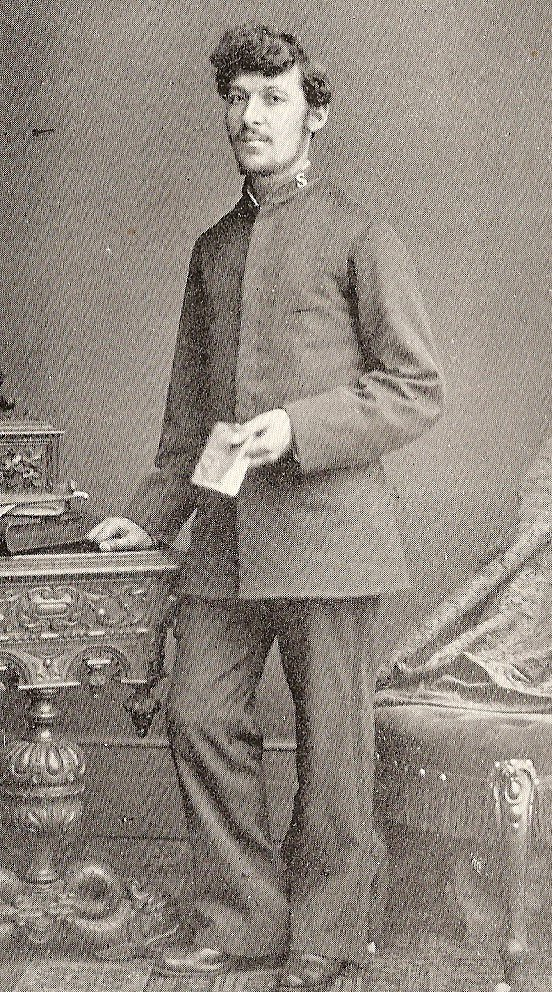
'Gipsy' Smith as a Captain in The Salvation Army

Rodney and Annie served in several assignments and saw membership rise to hundreds, then a thousand. By June 1882, great crowds were coming and the work was growing. A gold watch was given to him and about £5.00 (£330.00 in modern time) was presented to his wife by the warm-hearted members of local churches. (The Salvation Army corps was not part of this as Smith knew this was forbidden.) Acceptance of these gifts was still considered a breach of the rules and regulations of The Salvation Army, and for this he was dismissed from the organization. He was not given a chance to give back the gifts. (From his book Gipsy Smith His Life and Work it does look as though there were some difficulties between him and two of General Booth's sons, Bramwell and Ballington, which may have led to the decision which gave him no opportunity to put things right. Cornelius Phelps, a close friend of Bramwell, wrote “Bramwell had it out for Smith.”) This happened so suddenly that other evangelists had to step in to take up his preaching engagements, including a contemporary preacher Charles Crowie Smith, who took over two engagements in Hanley. His eight assignments with The Salvation Army had produced 23,000 decisions and his crowds were anywhere up to 1,500.

== Evangelist travels ==
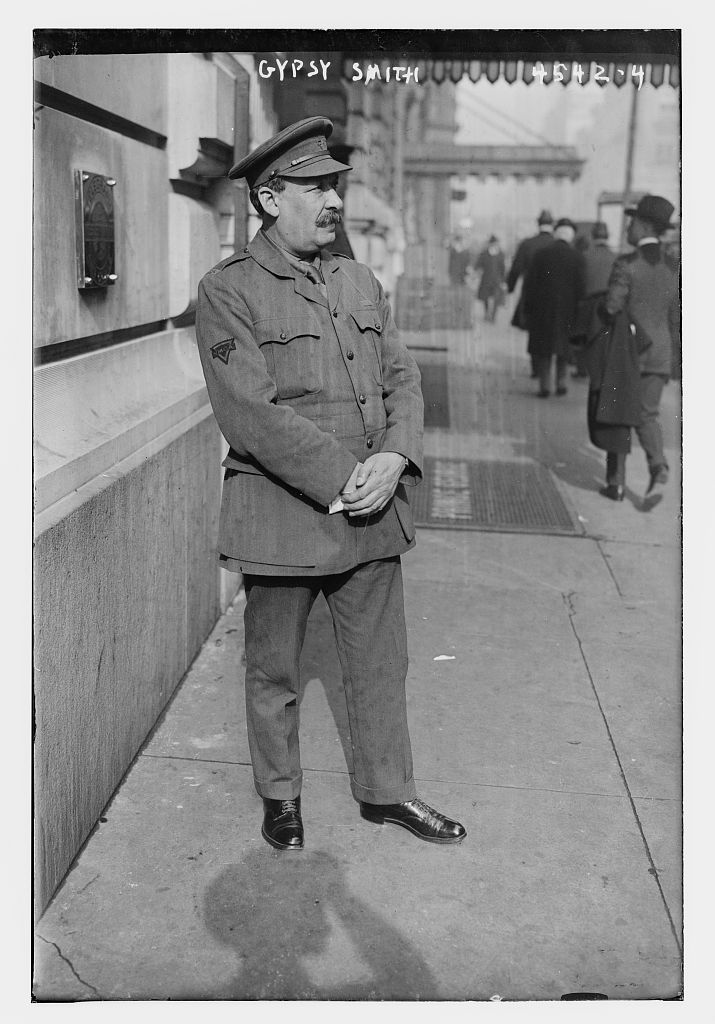
Gipsy Smith in Manhattan in 1918

He traveled extensively around the world on evangelistic crusades, drawing crowds numbering in the hundreds of thousands throughout his life. Busy as he was, he never grew tired of visiting Romani encampments whenever he could on both sides of the Atlantic. Gipsy never wrote a sermon out for preaching purposes. Smith wrote several books and could sing as well as he preached. Sometimes he would interrupt his sermon and burst into song. Several of these hymns he would sing were recorded by Columbia Records. Although he was a Methodist, ministers of all denominations loved him. It is said that he never had a meeting without conversions.

During World War I he ministered under the auspices of the Y.M.C.A. to the British troops in France, often visiting the front lines. As a result of this, King George VI made him a Member of the Order of the British Empire.

== Later life ==
Gipsy Smith's wife, Annie, died in 1937 at the age of 79 while he was in America. Front-page headlines in 1938 carried the news of the 78-year-old widower marrying Mary Alice Shaw on her 27th birthday. Smith's second wife helped him in his meetings, sang, did secretarial work, and later nursed him when his health failed.

Stricken by a heart attack, he died on the Queen Mary on a cruise in America, age 87. It was estimated that this was his 45th crossing of the Atlantic. His funeral service and cremation were held 8 August 1947 in New York City. A memorial with a plaque was unveiled on 2 July 1949 at Mill Plain, Epping Forest, England, his birthplace; his ashes are reportedly buried beneath this.
