= Church of St Nicholas, Norton =

Church in Hertfordshire, England

Coordinates: 51.9948°N 0.2078°W

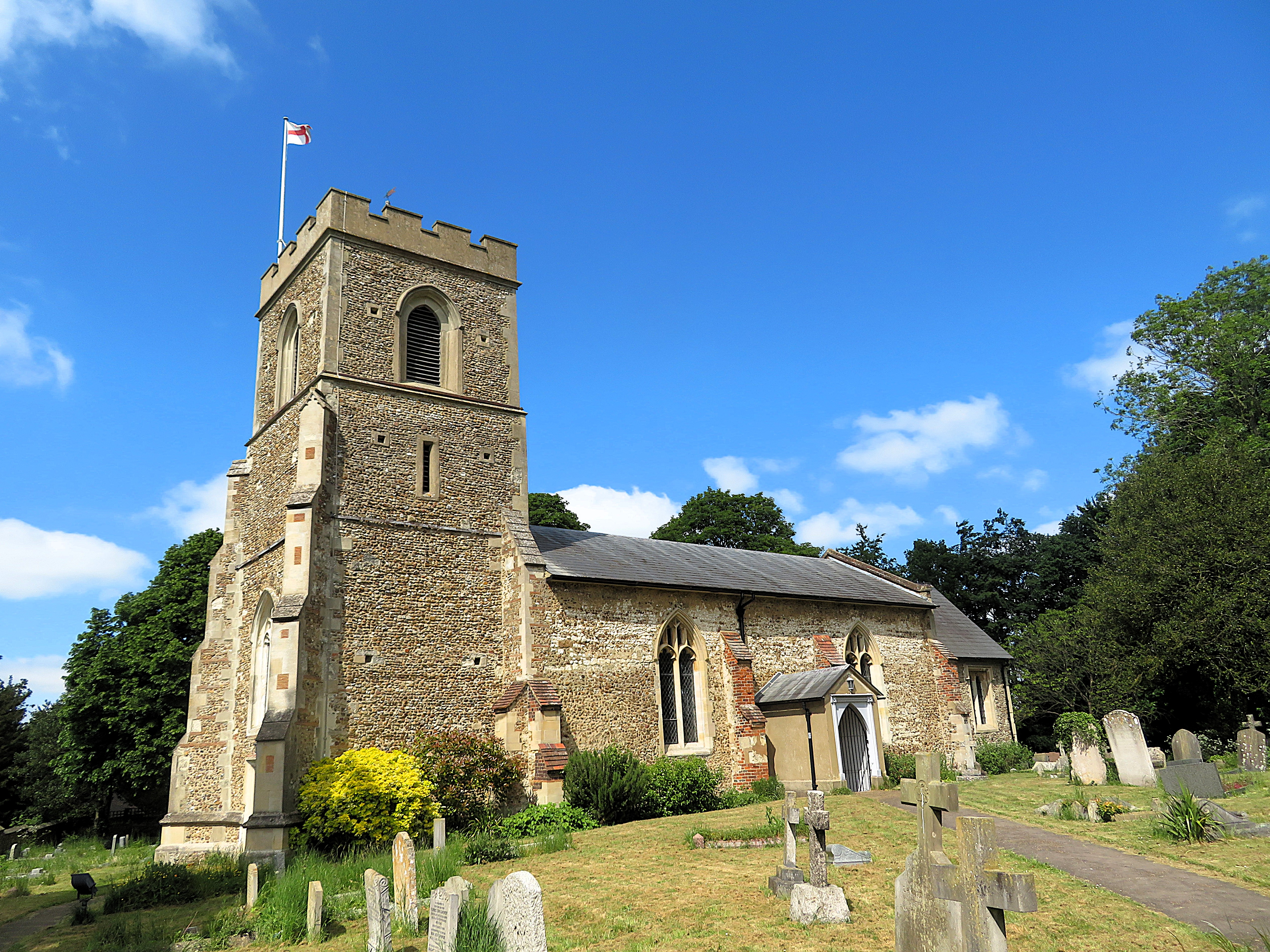
St Nicholas' Church, Norton

The Church of St Nicholas in Norton in Hertfordshire was originally the parish church for the village of Norton, which today has become a suburb of Letchworth Garden City. The present building dates from about 1109 to 1119, with additions in the 15th century including the tower. Before the Reformation it was a stopping point on the pilgrim route to the Abbey of St Albans and the shrine there.

== History ==
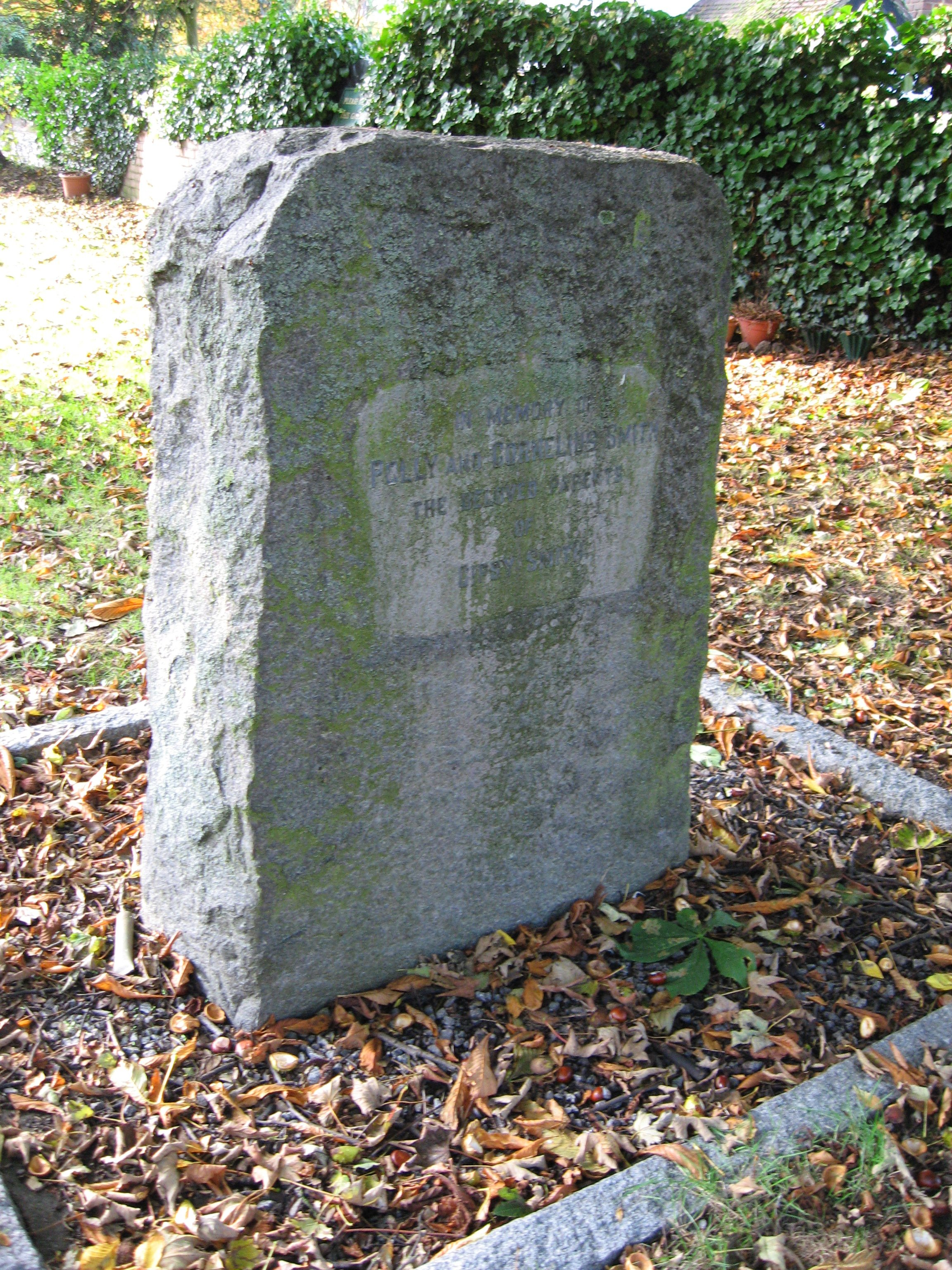
The grave of the parents of evangelist Rodney "Gipsy" Smith

The manor at Norton had belonged to the Abbey of St Albans since c.795, although they lost control of it for a period before it was restored to them in a charter of 1007. It is believed that there has been a church on the site since 1002, and the Domesday Book of 1086 mentions a priest at Norton. The present St Nicholas Church in Norton dates back to about 1119, having been built and dedicated by Hervey le Breton, Bishop of Ely. In about 1258 Laurence, the Rector at Norton, donated a tithe of the parish income to the Abbey of St Albans to help provide hospitality to travellers, mostly pilgrims visiting the shrine at the Abbey. In 1291 Pope Nicholas IV drew up a list of churches in England for taxation purposes. In this Norton is described as being in the Deanery of Baldock and the Archdeaconry of St Albans. In the same year the Pope granted indulgences to pilgrims visiting the church at Norton for the four feasts of the year dedicated to the Virgin Mary.

When the Abbey of St Albans was dissolved in 1539 the church and the rights reverted to Henry VIII. During the next 450 years these were owned firstly by the Bowles family of Wallington, then the Haselfoote family and after them by others until 1908 when they were purchased by the Bishop of St Albans. By the middle of the 17th century, Norton seems to have been Puritan by persuasion, and in 1649 two Norton inhabitants, John Knott and Elizabeth Palmer, were hanged at St Albans for witchcraft. Before his execution Knott accused 9 other Norton villagers of the same offence, but none seem to have been tried.

The parents of evangelist Rodney "Gipsy" Smith are buried in the churchyard, his mother having died from smallpox on nearby Norton Road in 1865. The large granite memorial was added later. By 1907 the church was in a state of neglect and a great deal of repair work was done before the church was reconsecrated in October 1909. In December of the same year the vicar George James Pierson died, having held that post in the parish since 1842 - almost 68 years.

It was the parish church for the village for 850 years until St George's Church was built in 1964 in nearby Letchworth Garden City; however, it is still in use as a place of worship, for weddings and as a chapel of ease.

== Design ==
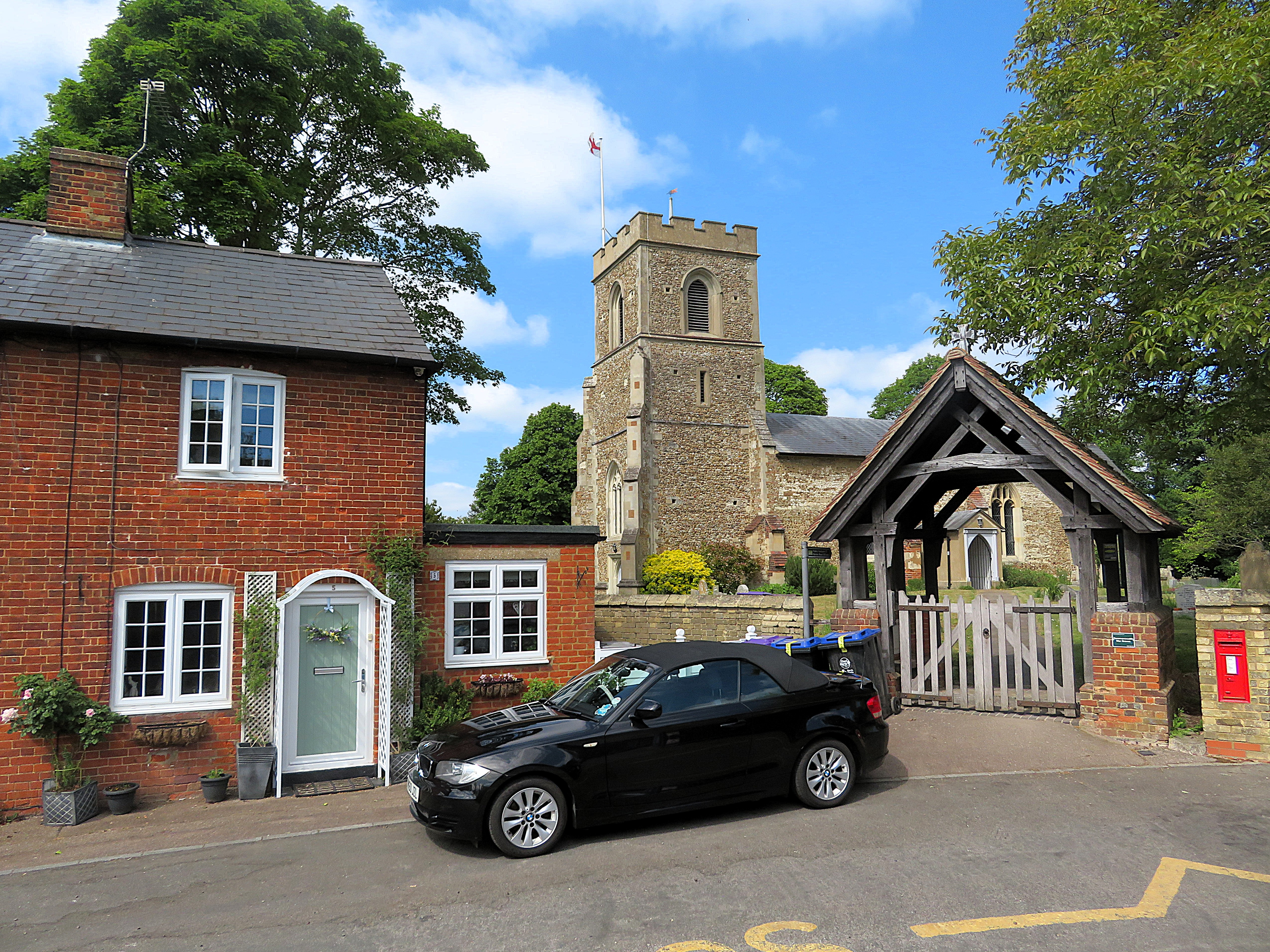
View from Church Lane, with the lychgate

The oldest part of the church is the south end of the nave and the Norman clunch chancel arch. The tower was built in the 15th century and the nave was extended at that time to connect with it and the walls of the nave were heightened. The windows and porch also date from that time, as do the older pews and the font. In 1814 the north doorway was blocked up and the coat of arms which now hang over the south door replaced an earlier larger one. The pulpit dates from the 17th century.

The chancel displays memorials to members of the Pryor family who owned much of the land and most of the cottages in the village. On the south wall of the nave is a memorial to the daughters of Katherine Cole of nearby Radwell manor who all died in infancy. Katherine was the daughter of the lord of Norton manor at that time, Richard Cleaver. Also on the south wall of the nave is a memorial to William Pym (an ancestor of Francis Pym, Foreign Secretary under Margaret Thatcher), who bought the manor from the descendants of Richard Cleaver in 1680, and his wife Elizabeth. In the floor close to the chancel arch is a memorial to their infant son, Guy, who died in April 1686. At that time the new year began on Lady Day on the 25 March, which explains why one of the Cleaver girls appears to have died (February 1652) before she was born (September 1652) and why some people think that Guy died in 1685.

It has been a Grade II listed building since 1954 and is in the Diocese of St Albans.

== The Bells ==
The church has a peal of eight bells, three of which are pre-20th century. The oldest dates from the 15th century and was probably cast by Joanna Hille, the widow of the bell founder Richard Hille. It is inscribed "Sancte Petre ora pro nobis". Another was cast by Robert Oldfield, who made bells between 1605 and 1640. The third older bell is inscribed "John Briant Hertford fecit 1815". The five modern bells were cast by John Taylor & Co of Loughborough in 1946. The modern treble was dedicated to Polly and Cornelius Smith, the parents of evangelist Rodney "Gipsy" Smith.

== The Organ ==
The organ is a one-manual with four draw-stops. It was originally built by Henry Speechly in 1870 for Lambeth Palace Chapel and restored by Manders in 1958. It was acquired by Norton Parish, and used in St George's Hall when this was being used for worship, before the current parish church, St George's, was built.

== Publications ==
- Sanderson, Jean A brief history and description of the Church of St Nicholas Norton in Hertfordshire - Friends of St Nicholas, Norton (ND:c1980)
- Giles, Deborah A brief history and description of the Church of St Nicholas Norton in Hertfordshire - Friends of St Nicholas, Norton (c1992)

== Gallery ==
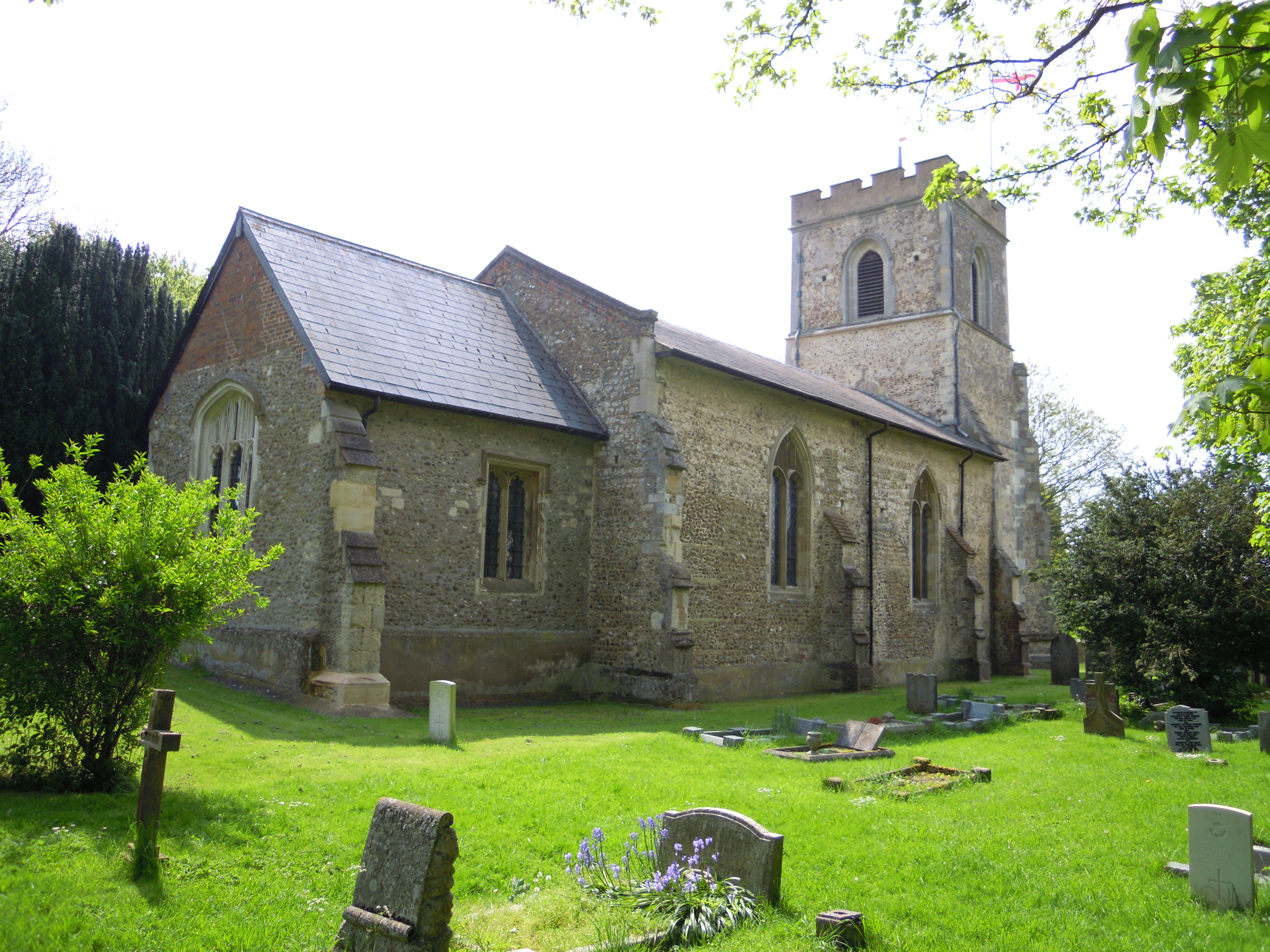
A view of the rear of the church

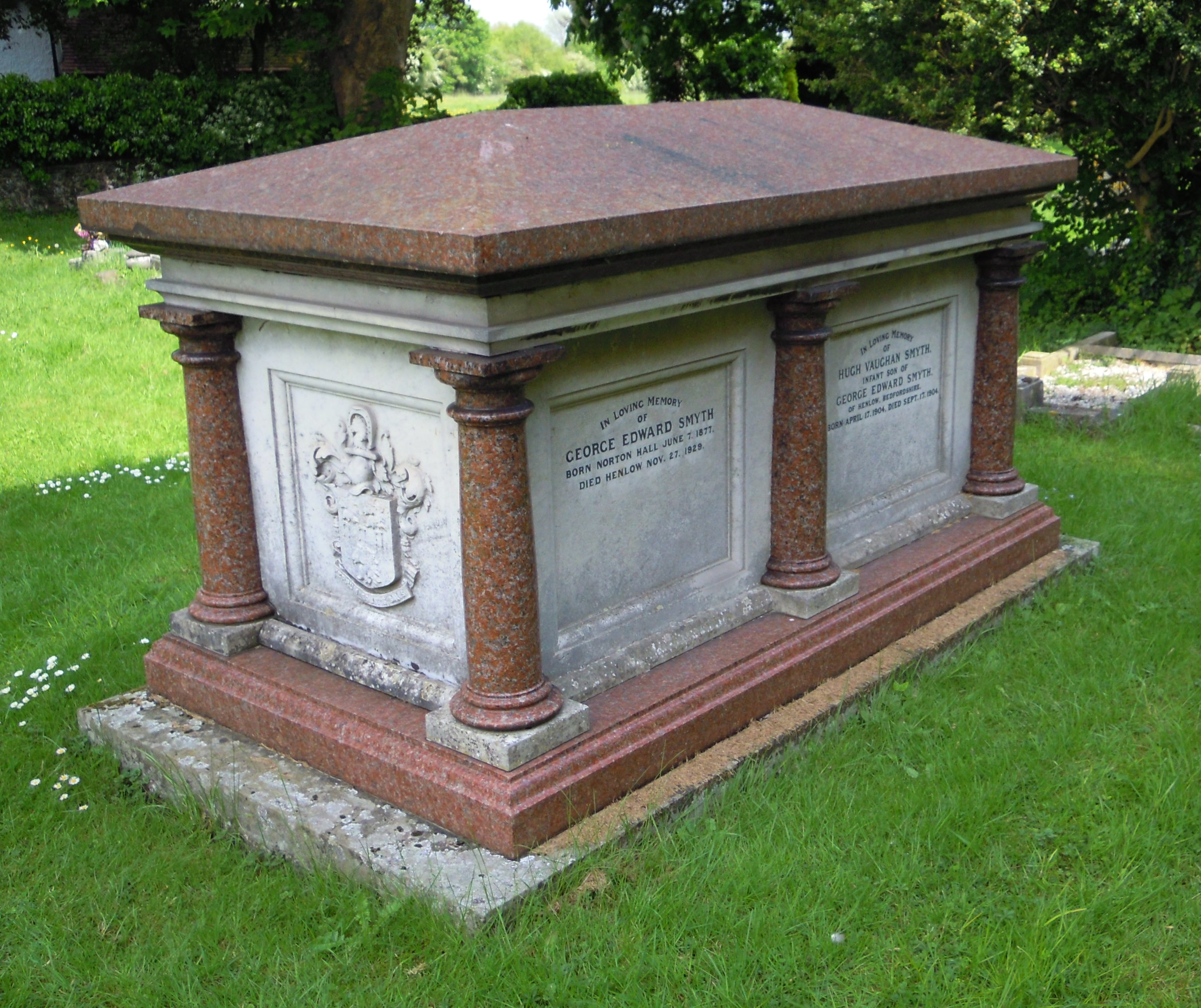
The Smyth family tomb in the churchyard
