= Norton School =

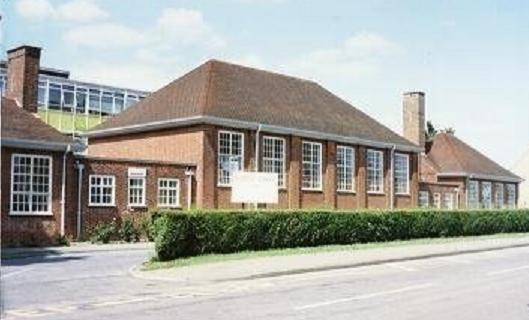

Location
- Norton Road; Letchworth, Hertfordshire, SG6 1AF; England; 51°59′21″N 0°13′09″W

Information
- Type: Comprehensive
- Established: 1905
- Closed: 2002
- Local authority: Hertfordshire
- Department for Education URN: 117513 Tables
- Ofsted: Reports
- Gender: Coeducational
- Age: 11 to 18

Norton School was a secondary school in Letchworth, Hertfordshire that was founded in 1905 and which closed in 2002 following a period of being in special measures. It has since been partially demolished and redeveloped as a collection of housing and apartments by Miller Homes.

== History ==
Originally named Norton Road School, the school was designed by Raymond Unwin. It was built in a quadrangle with a courtyard for open-air teaching and to allow plentiful light and movement of air. These principles were later to become standard in school design but were very innovative at the time.

Over the decades since its foundation, Norton School saw great expansion as pupil numbers grew, with various teaching blocks being added to accommodate these increasing numbers.

In its last year the school's thirty-two staff comprised thirteen staff on temporary contracts and nine from overseas - eight from South Africa and one from Jamaica. Fifteen of the staff joined the school in September 2001. In its final year Norton School was taken over by The Knights Templar School in neighbouring Baldock, and was renamed 'The Knights Templar School in Letchworth'. At this time the Norton School uniform of a sweat shirt was replaced with the Knights Templar uniform of jacket (with school badge) and school tie.

Following closure, pupils primarily transferred to The Knights Templar School, while others transferred to the nearby Highfield School and Fearnhill School.

== Former Headmasters ==
- C.A. Pease, BA (1905-1917)
- J.H. Haysman, JP (1917-1949)
- Edgar John, BA (1949-1975)
- Peter Wall, MA (1976-1995)
- Keith Wadsworth (1995-1999)
- Amanda Roberts (2000-2001)
- Peter Chapman MA (2001-2002), Headmaster of The Knights Templar School, with Associate Head Amanda Roberts (2001-2002)

== Notable former pupils and staff ==
- Shaun Hutson the horror writer attended the school
- Glenn Christodoulou, Chairman of the Crimean War Research Society, taught at the school (1981-1989)
- Dr Chris Howard OBE, former Head of History at the school and former Headteacher at the Lewis School in Pengam and President of NAHT Wales (2009)
